= Nordnorsk Kunstmuseum =

Museum in Tromsø, Norway

Coordinates: 69.6482°N 18.9599°E

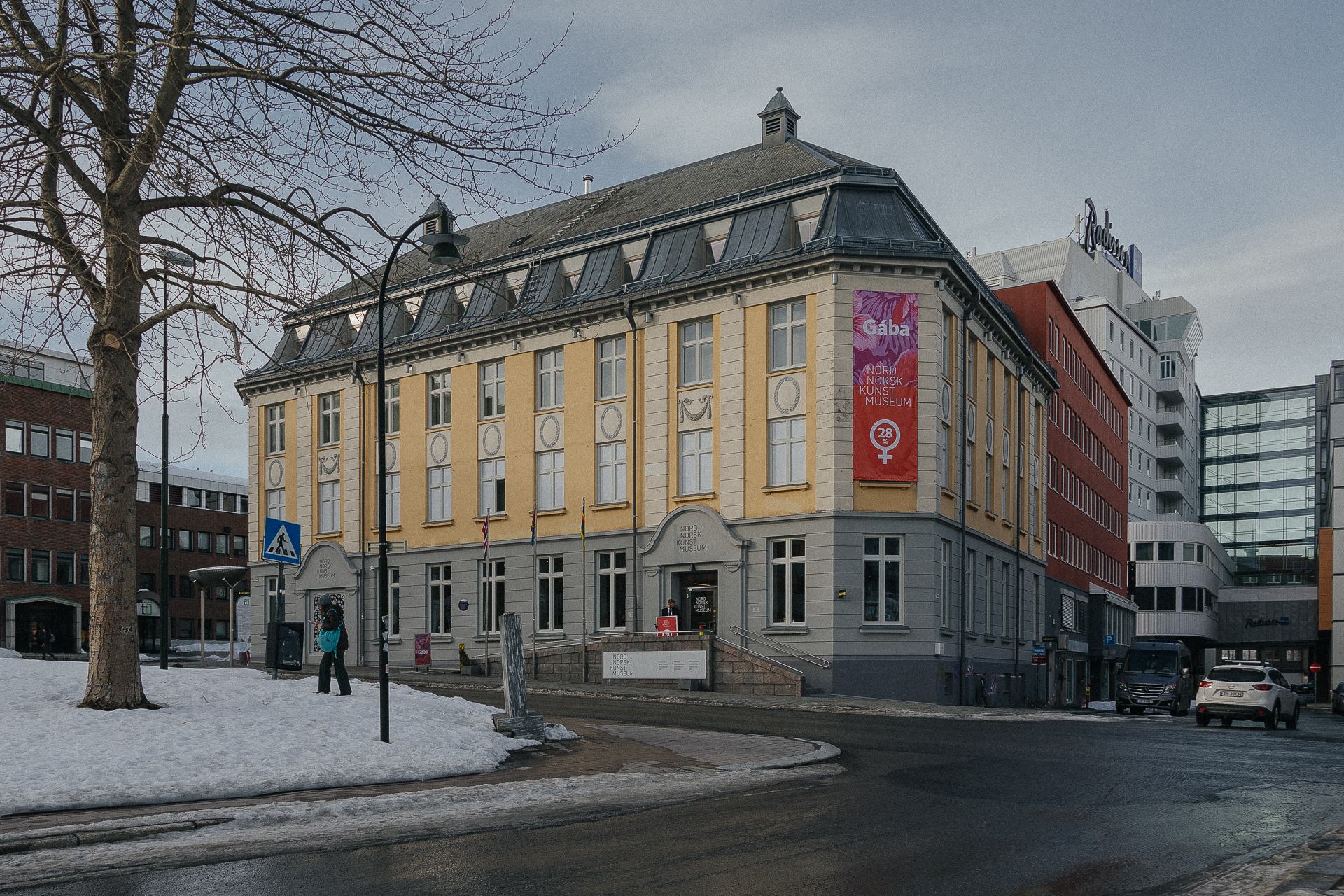
- Museum building in Tromsø from 1917 at Sjøgata 1 originally designed as a Post office and Telegraph
- Established: 01.11.1985
- Location: Sjøgata 1, 9008 Tromsø
- Type: Art Museum
- Collection size: 2225
- Director: Stina Högkvist (2025–)
- Chairperson: Christin Kristoffersen
- Curator: Lise Dahl, Charis Gullickson, Eva Skotnes Vikjord
- Architect: Søren Andres Wiese Opsah
- Website: www.nnkm.no

Nordnorsk Kunstmuseum is a Norwegian visual arts museum in Northern Norway. The Northern Norwegian Art Museum is responsible for the entire northern region and in 2010 established a separate department for the nationwide program.

== History ==
Established as a foundation in 1985, the Northern Norway Art Museum moved to its current location in Tromsø in 2001. The building was originally designed by architect Søren Andreas Wiese-Opsahl in 1917 to house post and telegraph offices. In 1967 the building was commissioned as a police station.

Through the years the Northern Norway Art Museum has presented thematic exhibitions on subjects such as still life, Norwegian and Russian arts and crafts, Peder Balke, and Sámi contemporary art. The museum has also presented solo exhibitions of artists like Marit Følstad, Kjell Varvin, and Håkon Fageraas.

== Collections ==
The museum presents different temporary exhibitions of both contemporary and historical art during the year, in addition to the permanent collection. The permanent collection contains over 2,250 works, of which only a small, representative amount is on display. The collection includes artworks from the late 18th century to the present day.

The museum also deposits art from the National Museum of Art, Architecture and Design, Kode - Museum of art, crafts, design and music in Bergen, SpareBank 1 Northern Norway Art Foundation, Sparebankstiftelsen DNB NOR, University of Tromsø, Tromsø Kunstforening, Tromsø University Museum and private collections. Key artists include Peder Balke, Adelsteen Normann, Harriet Backer, Anna-Eva Bergman and Olav Christopher Jenssen.

Nordnorsk Kunstmuseum was named Norway's «Museum of the Year 2017» by the Norwegian museum association (Norwegian: Norges Museumsforbund). The museum performance Sámi Dáiddamusea in collaboration with RiddoDuouttarMuseat won the Art Critics Award 2018, Tromsø municipality's culture award 2017 and Norwegian Audience Development (Norwegian: Norsk Publikumsutvikling) award for Next internship (Norwegian: Neste praksis) 2017. The museum previously won the Art Critics Award in 2014 for the exhibition Peder Balke Vision and Revolution.

== Other locations ==
The museum has a special responsibility for the northern parts of Norway, and tours 2-3 smaller exhibitions in Nordland, Troms, Finnmark and Svalbard. In 2015 the satellite Kunsthall Svalbard opened in Longyearbyen, Svalbard as a dedicated arena for contemporary art. Queen Sonja of Norway did the official opening, and the first exhibition was Glacier by Joan Jonas.

== Gallery ==
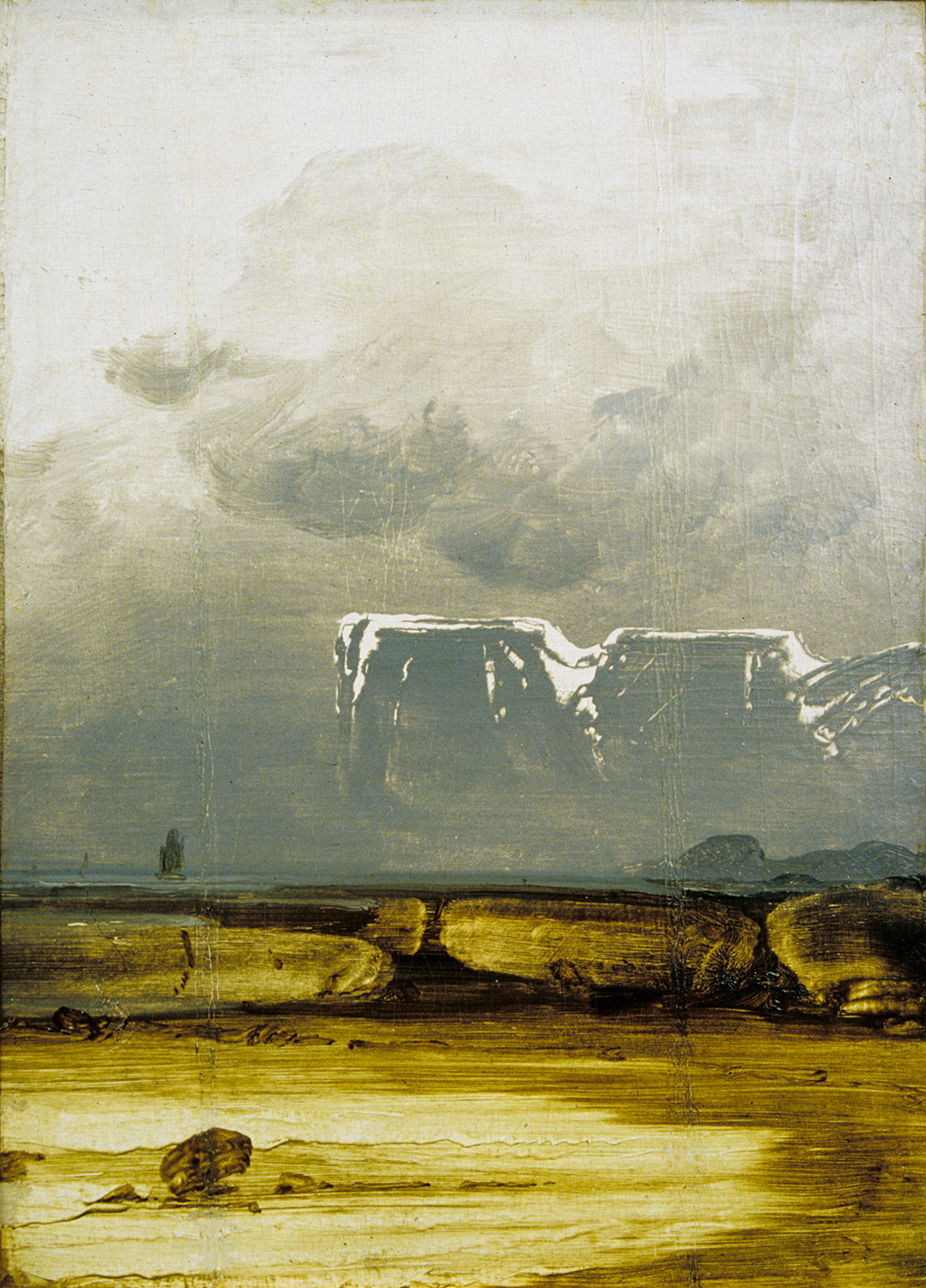
Peder Balke From North Cape (1860s)

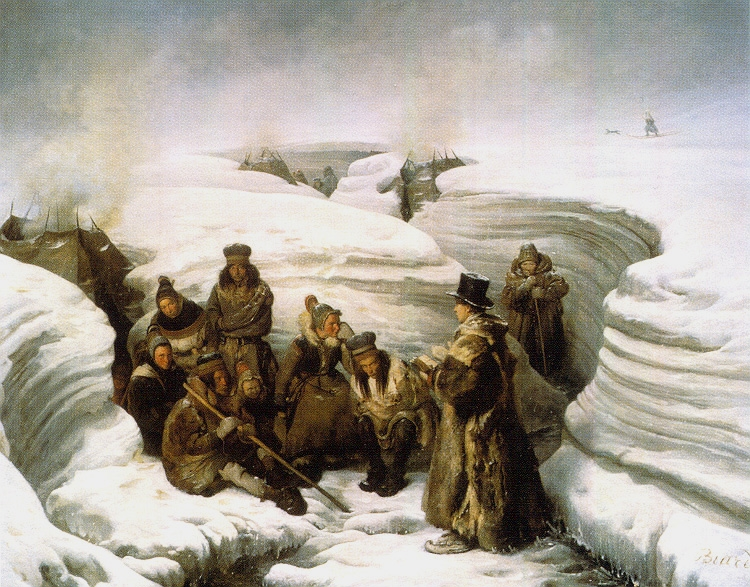
François-Auguste Biard The Minister Laestadius teaching Laplanders (1840)

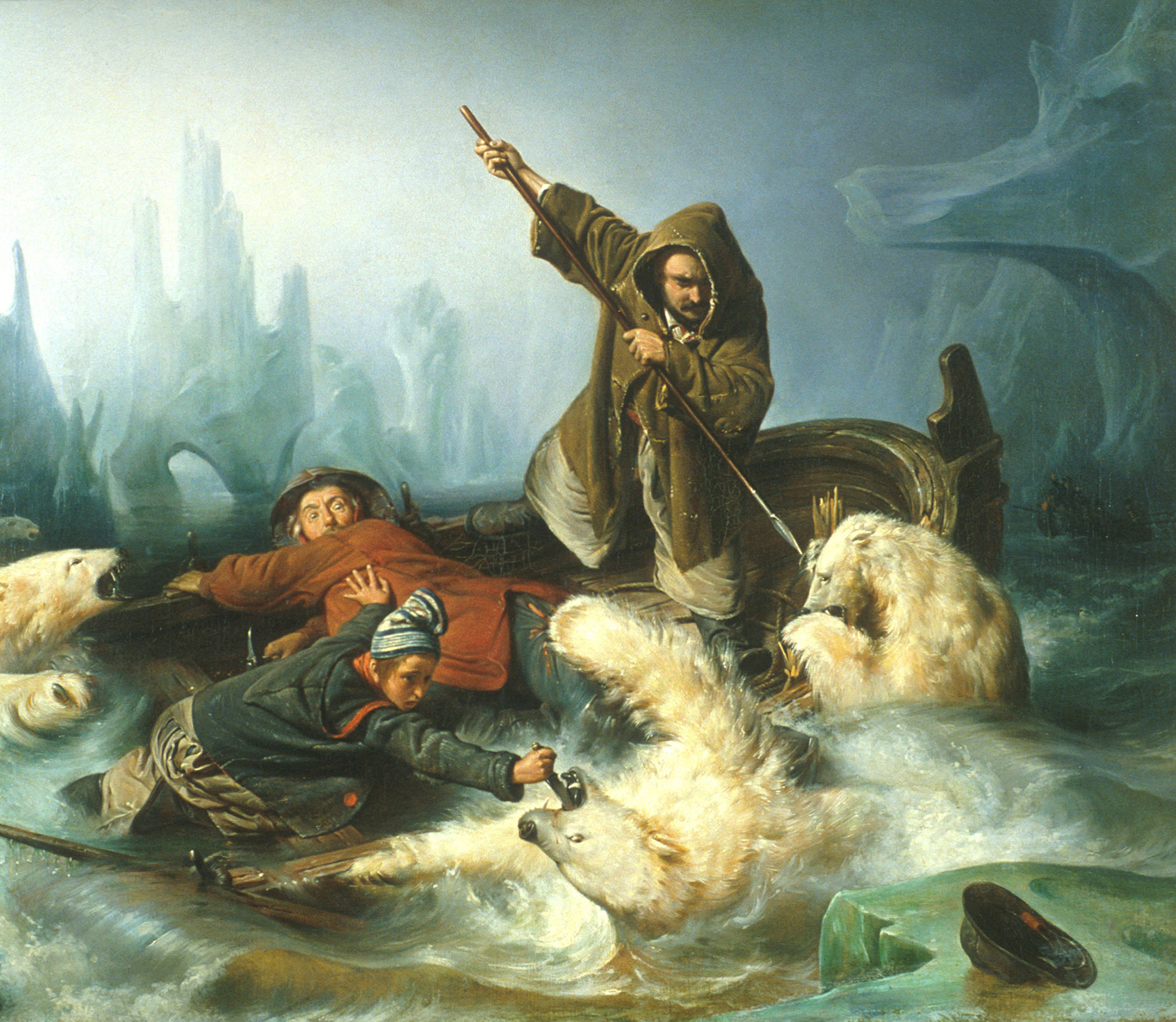
François-Auguste Biard Fighting Polar Bears (1839)

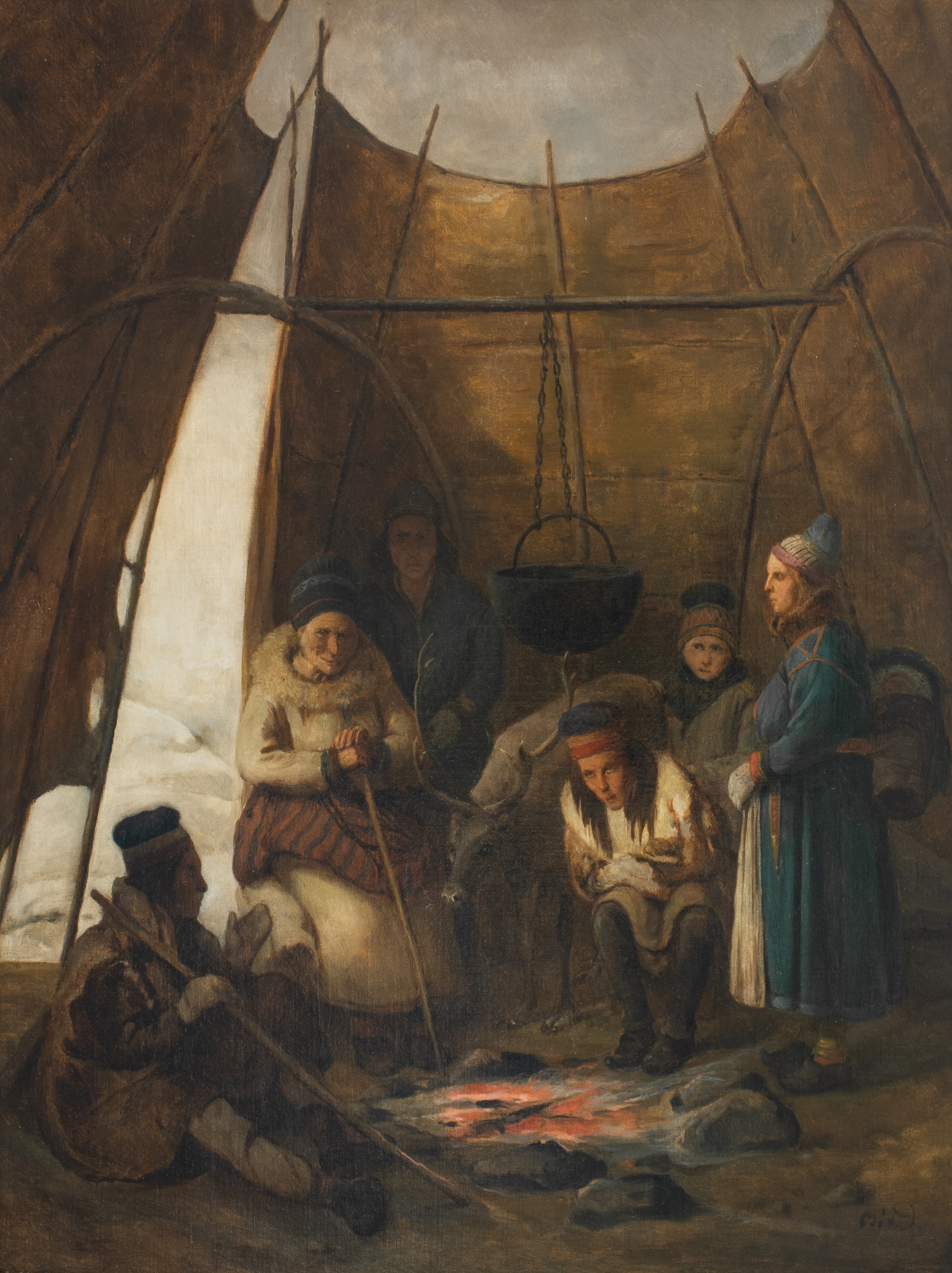
François-Auguste Biard Sámi camp (1840)

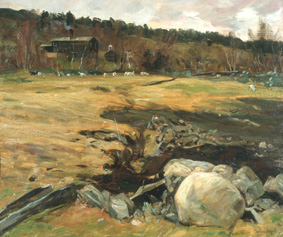
Gustav Wentzel Autumn Landscape

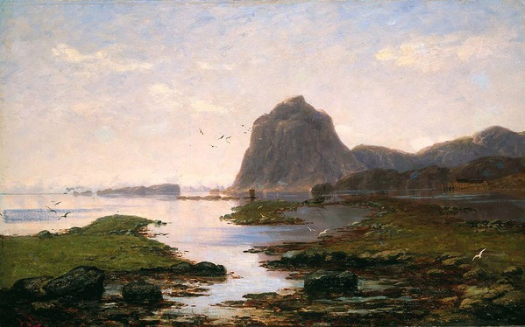
Betzy Akersloot-Bergs Coastal part of northern Norway

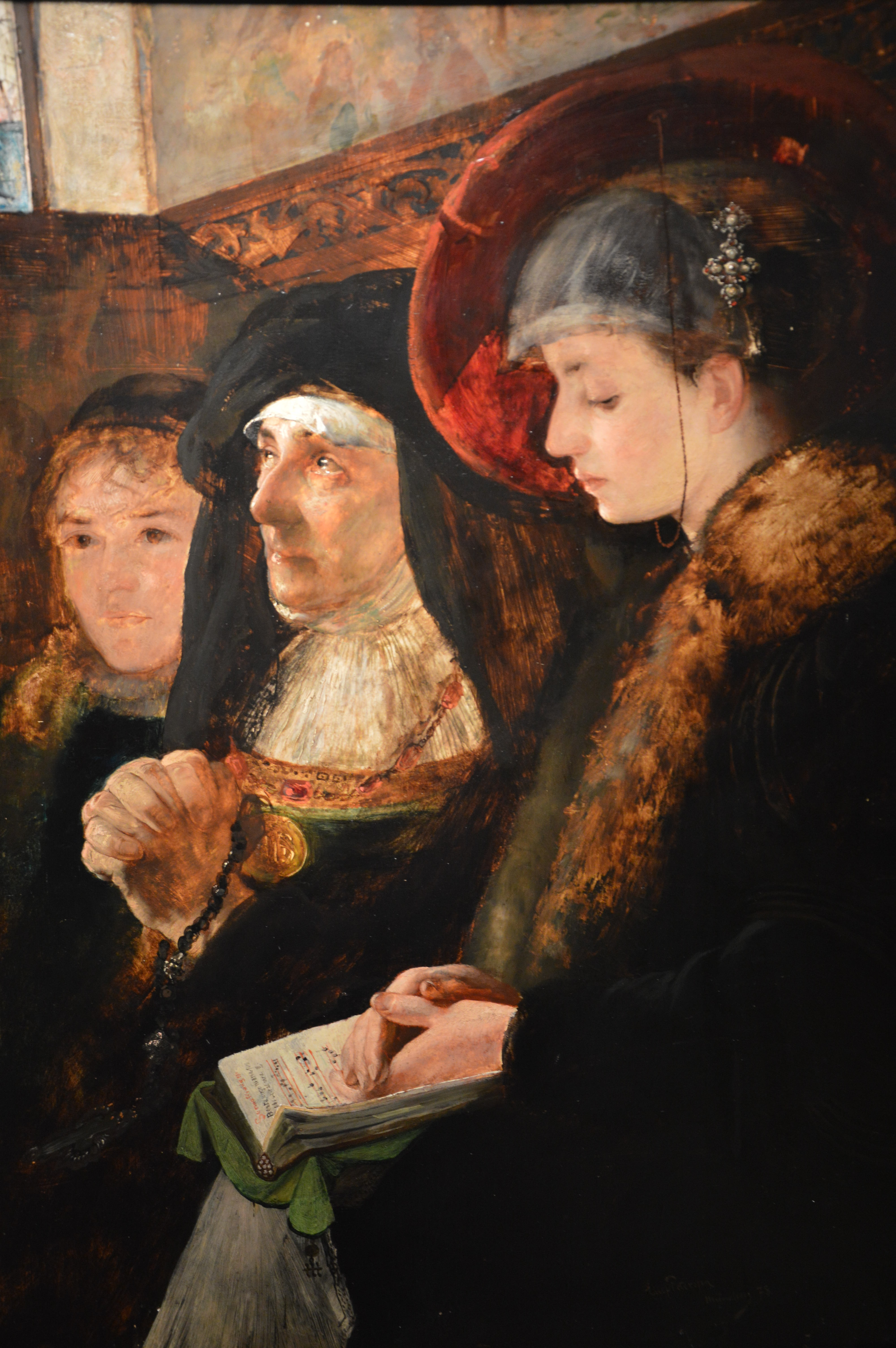
Eilif Peterssen In Church

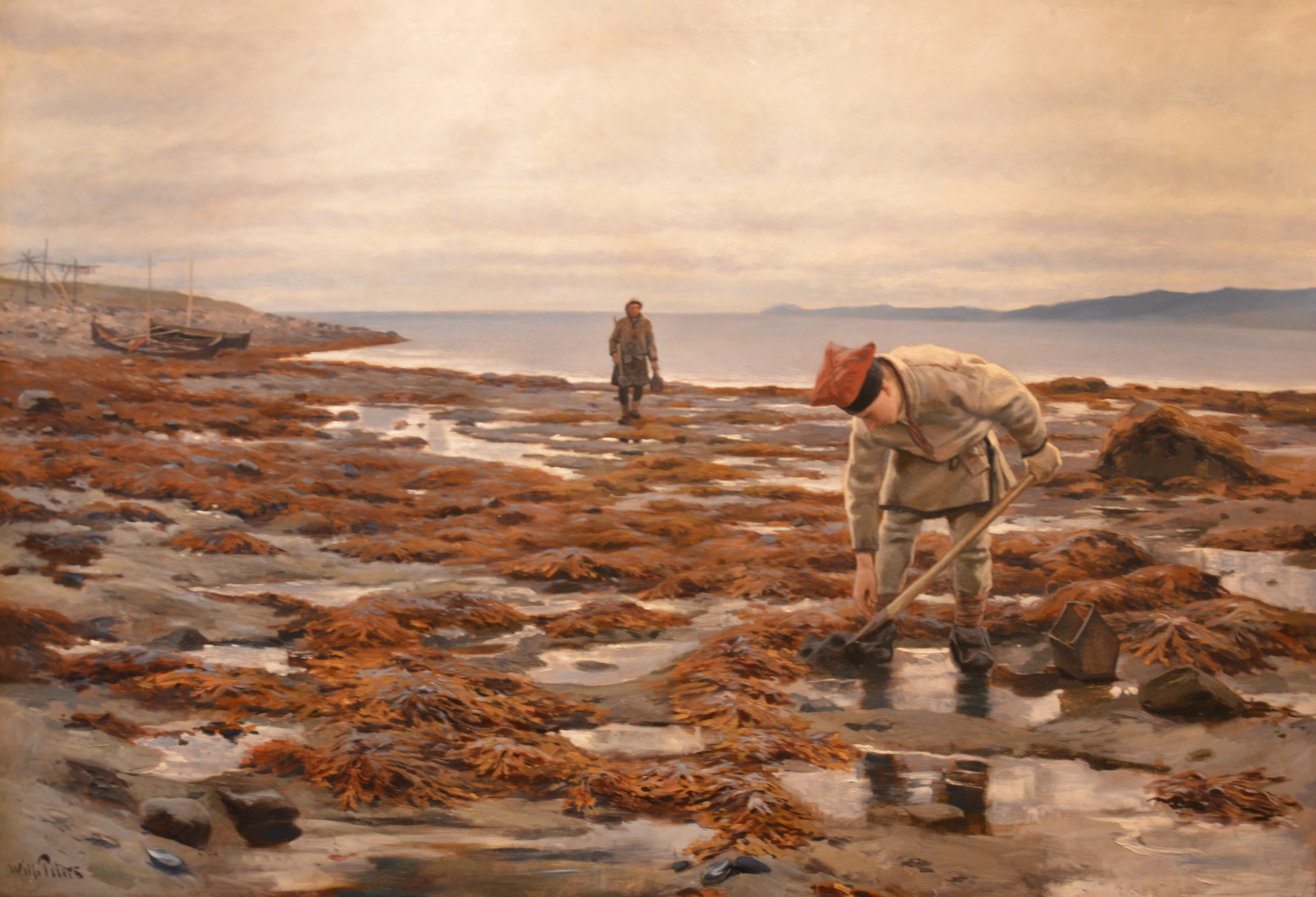
Wilhelm Peters Digging for worms (1883–1884)

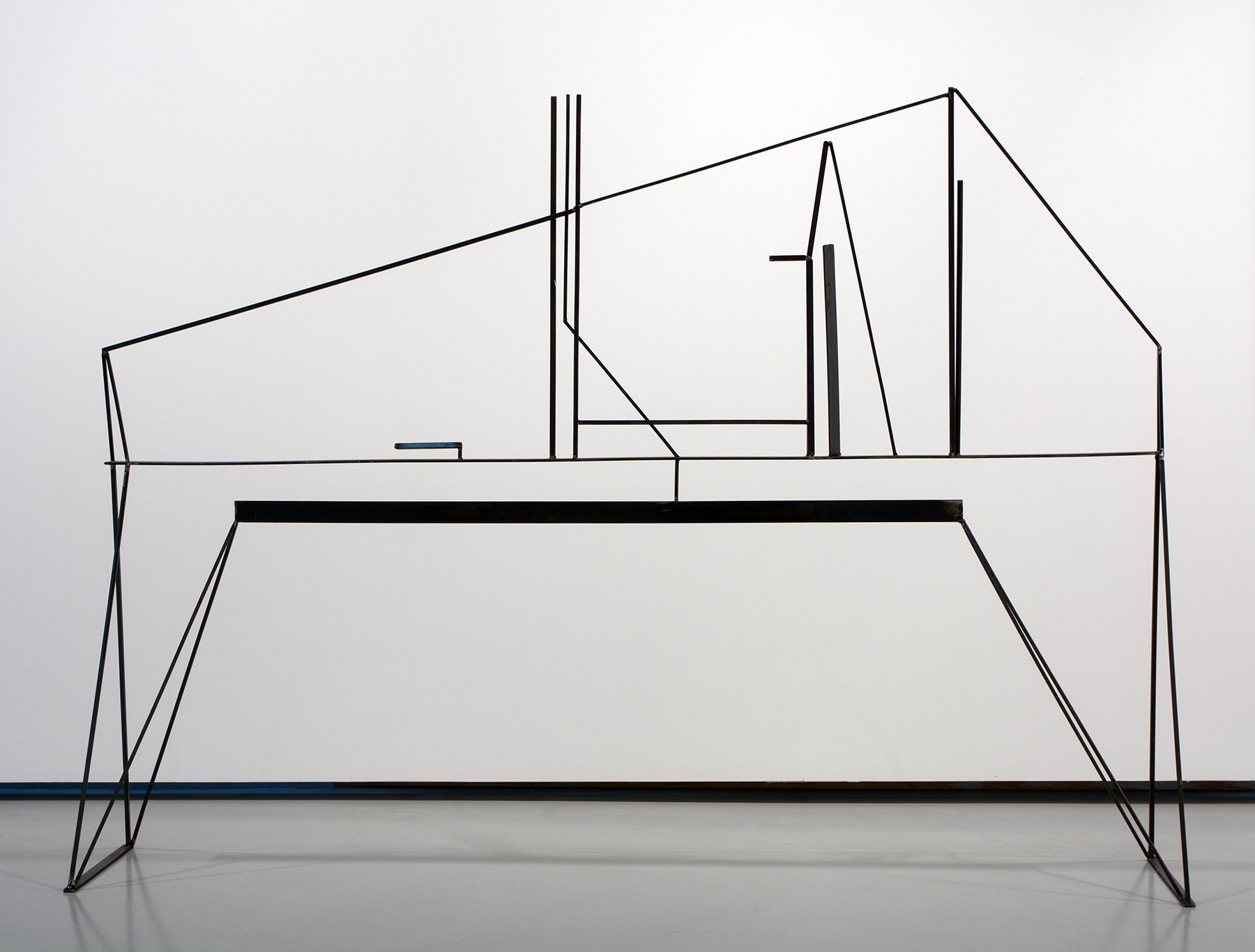
Kjell Varvin's O'HOY (1995)

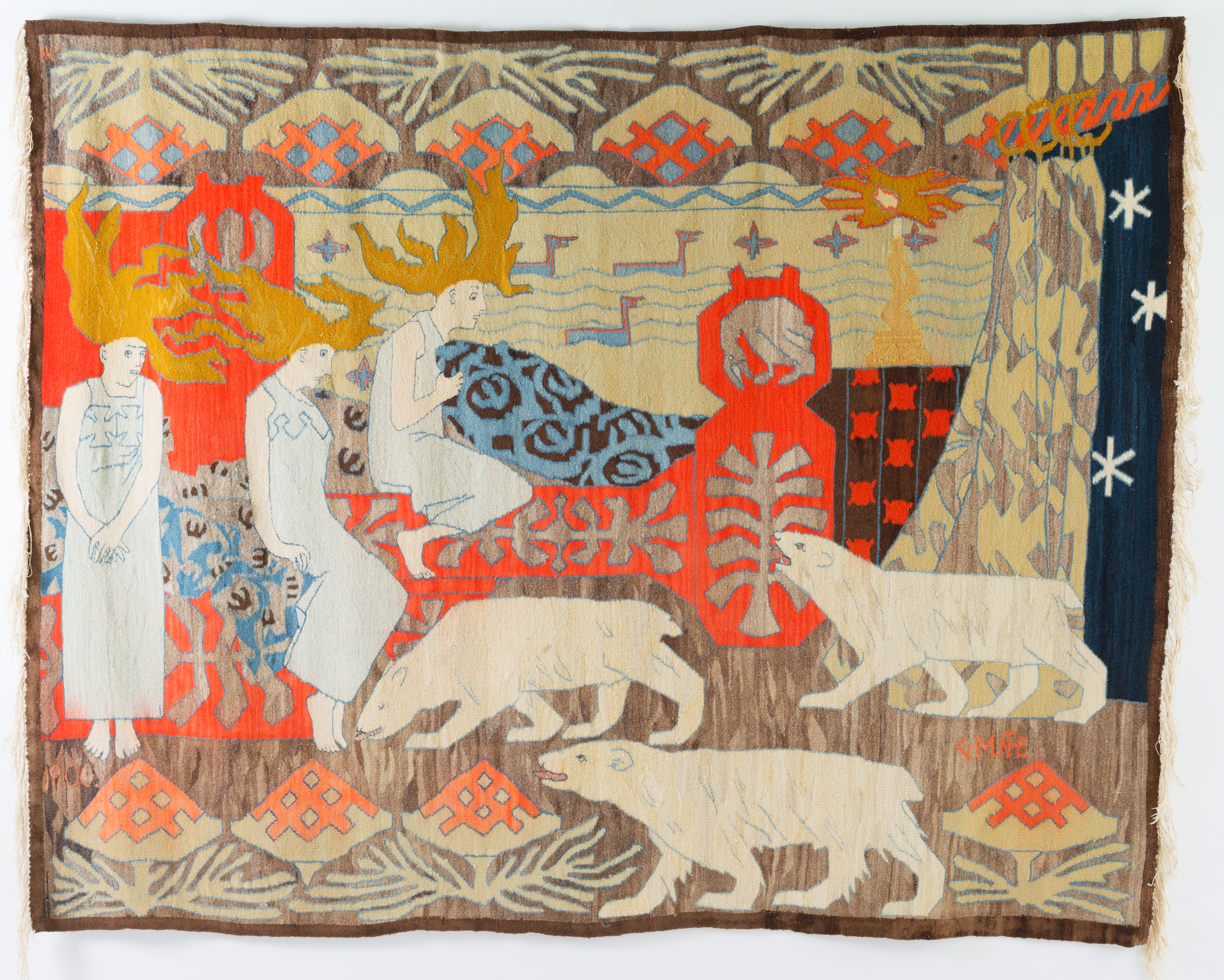
Gerhard Munthe Beilerne (Nordlysdøtrene) (1892)

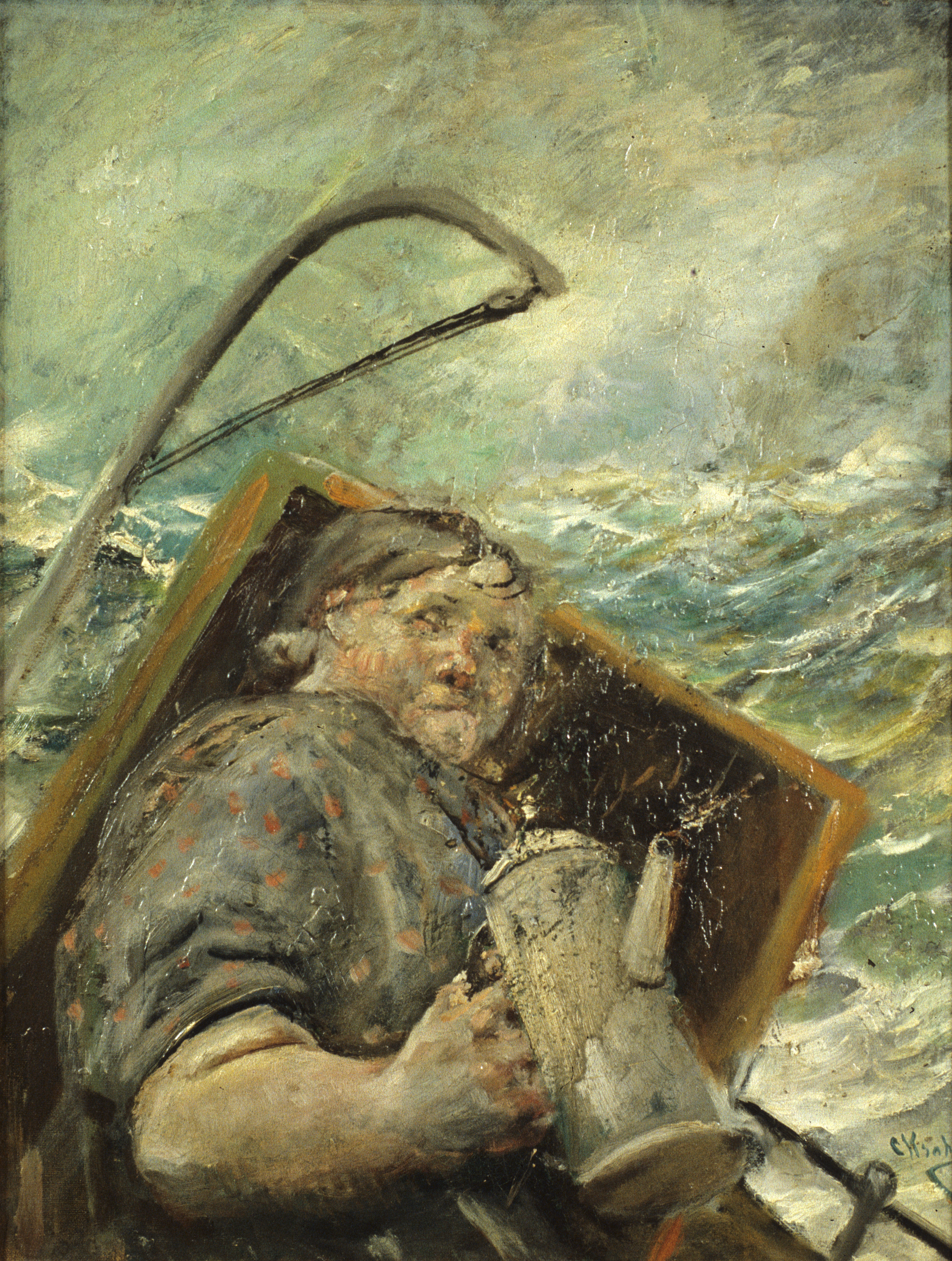
Christian Krohgs Trise i arbeid (Trissa) (1901)

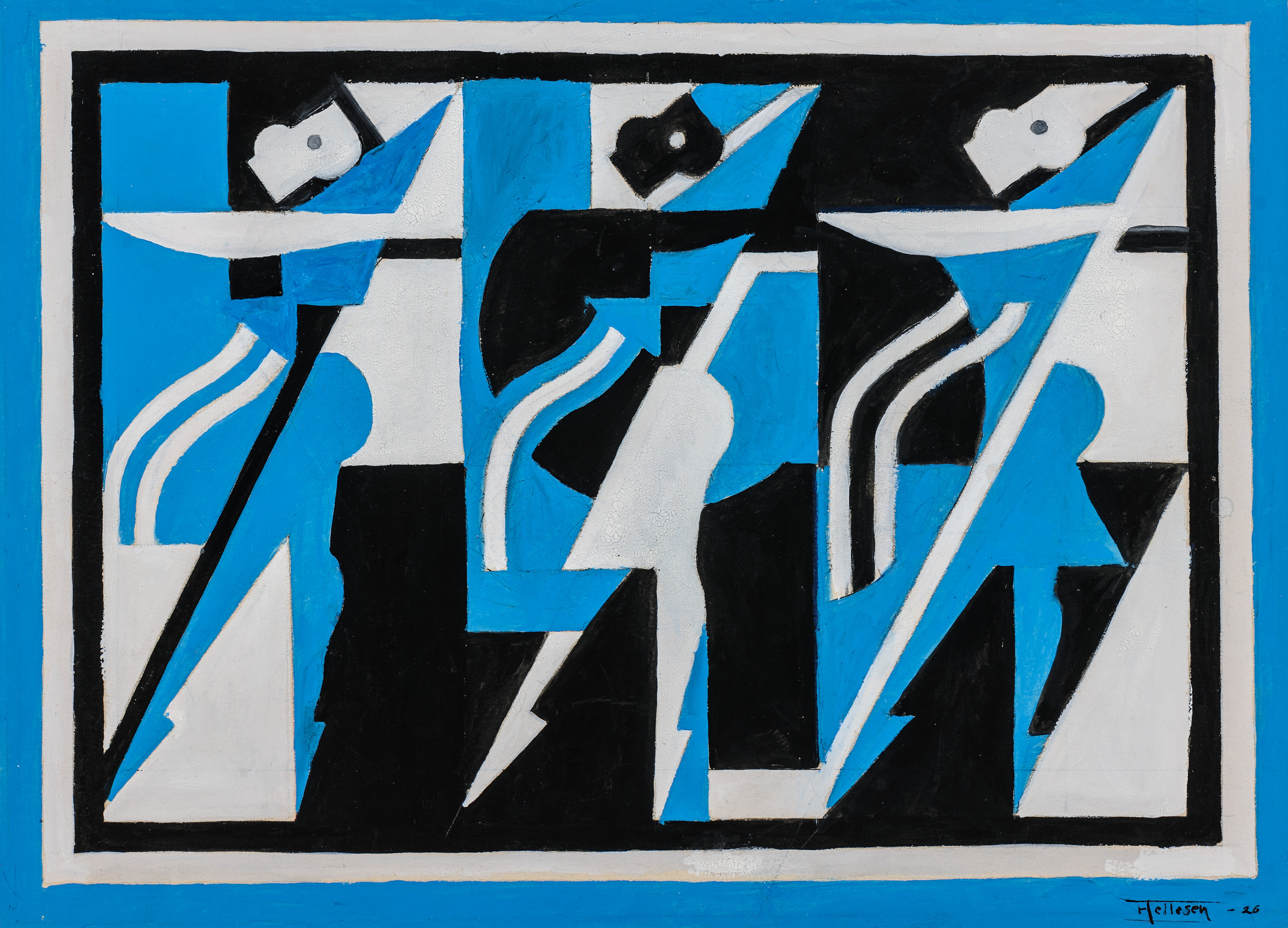
Thorvald Hellesen Komposisjon (1926)

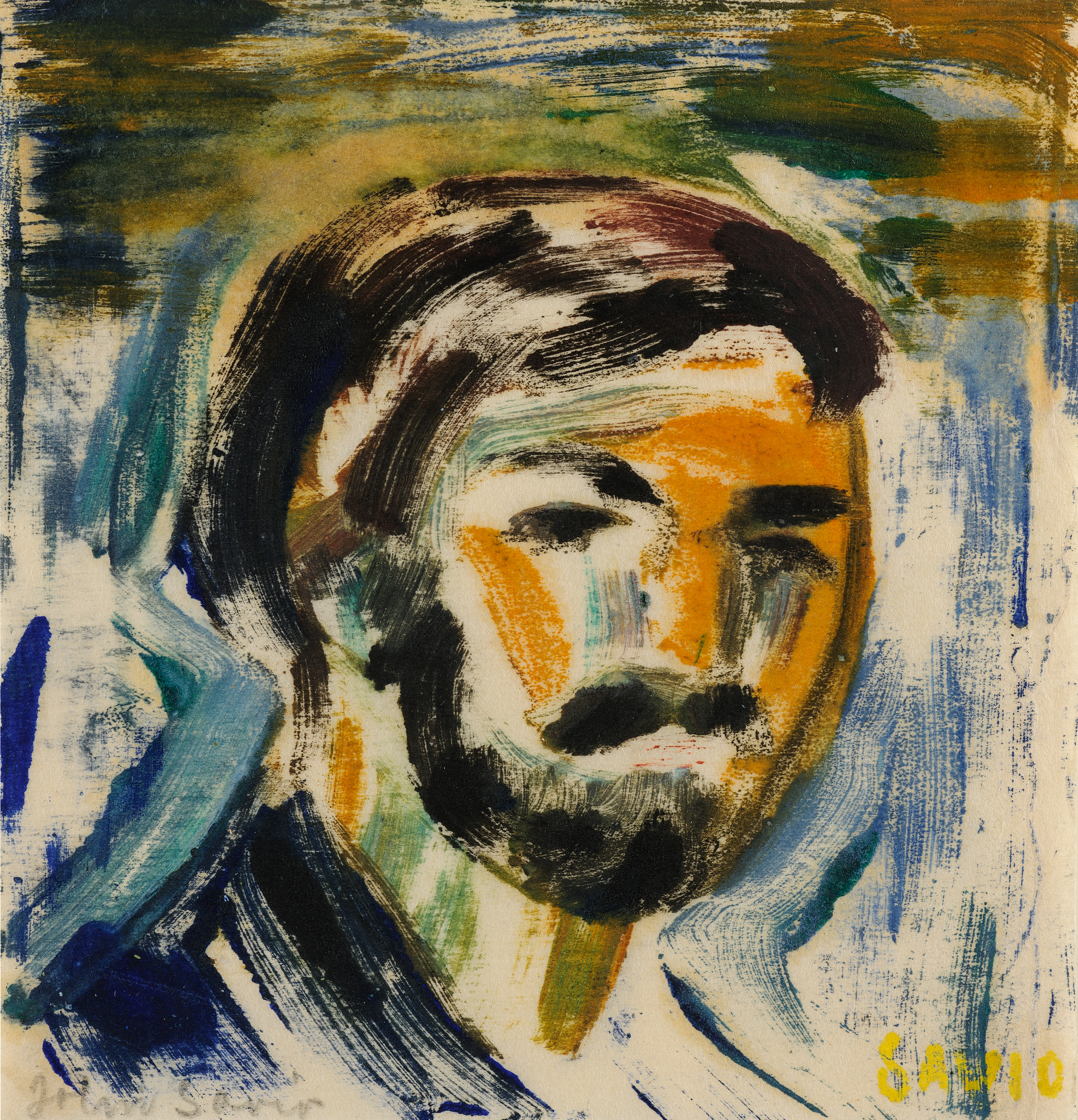
John Savio Selfportrait

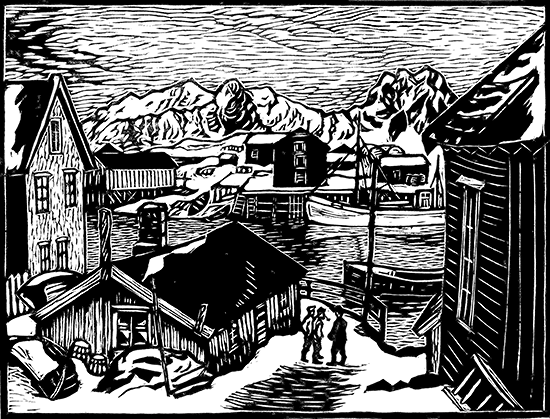
John Savio The island of Lillemolla; in the background Svolvær
