= Wartiainen =

Wartiainen is a surname. Notable people with the surname include:

- Kai Wartiainen (born 1953), Finnish architect and academic
- Yvonne Wartiainen (born 1976), Norwegian painter
