= Kirkenes =

City in Sør-Varanger, Finnmark, Norway

Kirkenes: Kirkenes (Norwegian); Girkonjárga (Northern Sami); Kirkkoniemi (Kven)
- Town
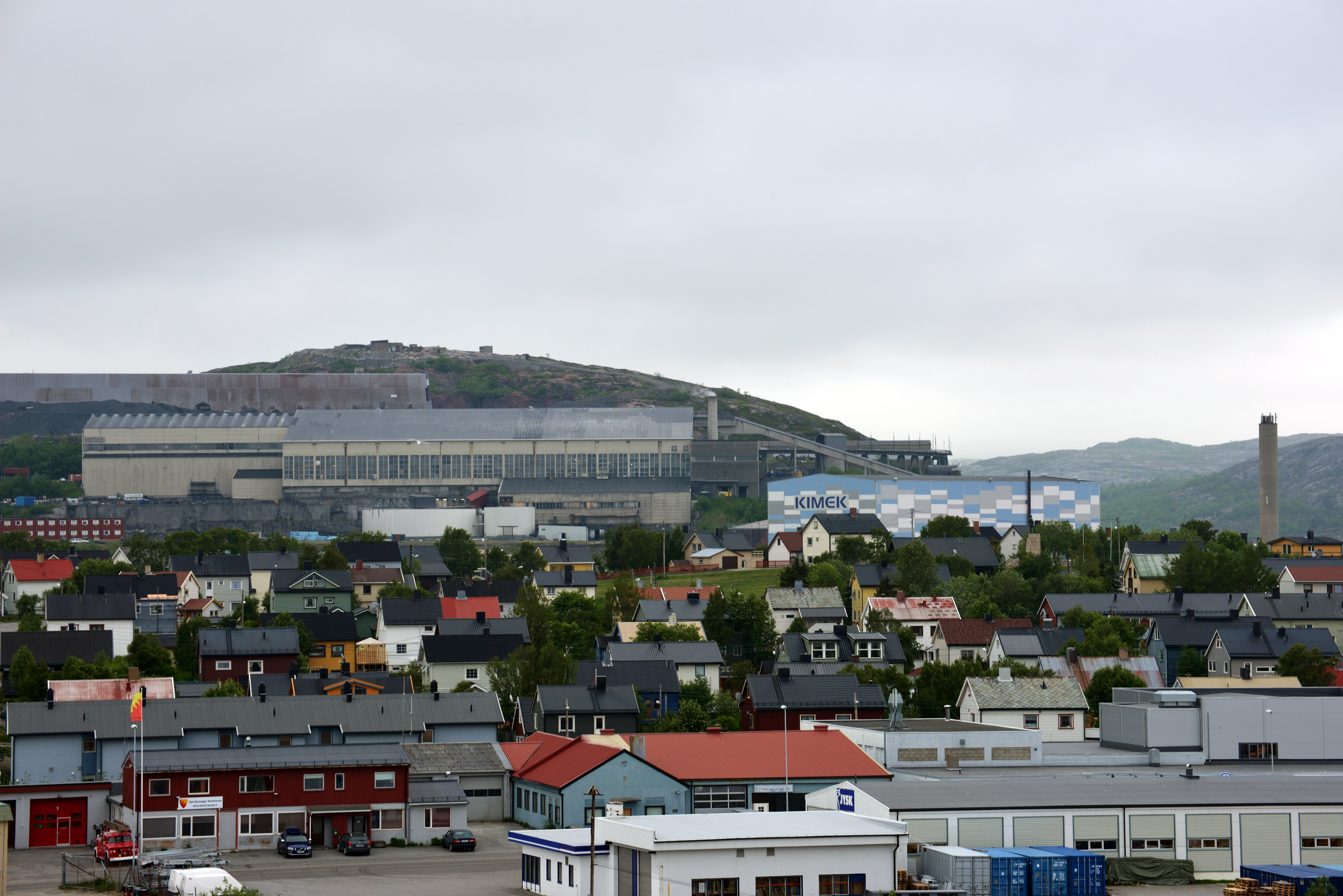
- View of the town in June 2013
- Interactive map of Kirkenes
- Location within Finnmark Location within Norway
- Coordinates: 69°43′37″N 30°02′44″E
- Country: Norway
- Region: Eastern Norway
- County: Finnmark
- District: Øst-Finnmark
- Municipality: Sør-Varanger Municipality
- Established as
- Town (By): 1998

Area
  - Total: 2.29 km^{2} (0.88 sq mi)
- Elevation: 9 m (30 ft)

Population (2023)
  - Total: 3,404
  - Density: 1,486/km^{2} (3,850/sq mi)
- Time zone: UTC+01:00 (CET)
  - Summer (DST): UTC+02:00 (CEST)
- Post Code: 9900 Kirkenes

Kirkenes (Norwegian: [ˈçɪ̂rkəneːs]), known as Girkonjárga in Northern Sami (pronounced [ˈkir̥ː.ko.ˌɲaːrːka]) and Kirkkoniemi in Kven, is a town in Sør-Varanger Municipality in Finnmark county, in the far northeastern part of Norway. The town lies on a peninsula along the Bøkfjorden, an arm of the large Varangerfjorden, and is located just a few kilometres from the Norway–Russia border.

The 2.29-square-kilometre (570-acre) town has a population (2023) of 3,404 and a population density of 1,486 inhabitants per square kilometre (3,850/sq mi). When the neighbouring suburban villages of Hesseng, Skytterhusfjellet, Sandnes and Bjørnevatn are all included with Kirkenes, the urban area reaches a population of almost 8,000.

Although Kirkenes is the Norwegian town closest to the Russian border, the town of Vardø to its north is located further east in Norway.

== Names ==
Due to its close proximity to Russians, Finns and Skolt Sami, the town is also known as Kirkkoniemi (Finnish), Киркенес (Russian), and Ǩeârkknjargg (Skolt Sami).

== History ==
The area around Kirkenes was a common Norwegian–Russian district until 1826, when the present border was settled. The original name of the peninsula was Piselvnes ("Pis River headland"), but this was changed to Kirkenes (meaning "church headland") after the Kirkenes Church was built here in 1862. Kirkenes was a village until 1998 when it received town status.

=== World War II ===
During the occupation of Norway by Nazi Germany, Kirkenes was one of the many bases for the German Kriegsmarine and the Luftwaffe's Jagdgeschwader 5, and apart from that, the area served as a main base for supplies to the Murmansk front (see Lapland War).

People of Kirkenes returning home after the Petsamo–Kirkenes Offensive

Reportedly, Kirkenes was second after Malta on a list of European towns experiencing air-raid alarms and attacks, with more than 1,000 alarms and 320 air attacks. The town was released by the Red Army on 25 October 1944 when the German Wehrmacht was pushed out and fled the area after having destroyed most of the remaining infrastructure. Only 13 houses survived the war.

Close to the town there is a memorial to 11 freedom fighters who helped the partisans collect information about the German occupation. In the summer of 1943, their activities were discovered and many of them were sent to a prisoner-of-war camp near Kirkenes. Following a court-martial the 11 were sentenced to death and were killed near the memorial spot on 18 August 1943. When the common grave was opened in 1946 it was found that the men had been beaten to death. Following the post mortem and memorial service, the bodies were returned to their homesteads.

== Geography ==
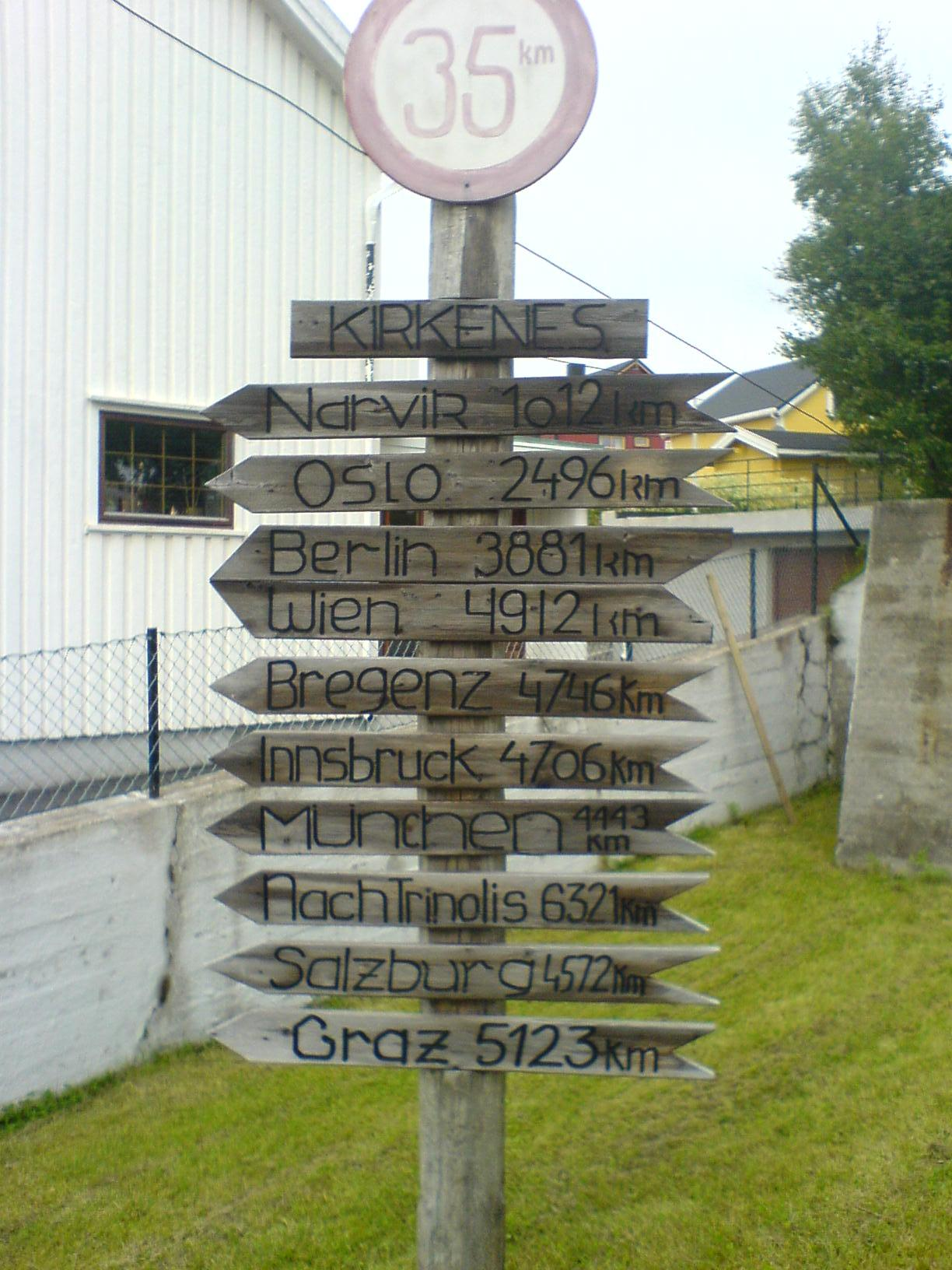
Kirkenes is located very far from most of Europe. Distances are along the E6 road even if the road through Finland is shorter.

Kirkenes is located in the extreme northeastern part of Norway on the Bøkfjorden, a branch of the Varangerfjorden, which is a vast bay connected to the Barents Sea near the Russian–Norwegian border. The town is situated about 400 kilometres (250 mi) north of the Arctic Circle, resulting in midnight sun and polar night both lasting for sustained lengths of time depending on season.

Kirkenes is located just east of the 30th meridian east. As a result, it is further east than Istanbul, which marks one of the European borders with Asia. The easternmost point of Norway and the municipality is also at a point further east than Saint Petersburg.

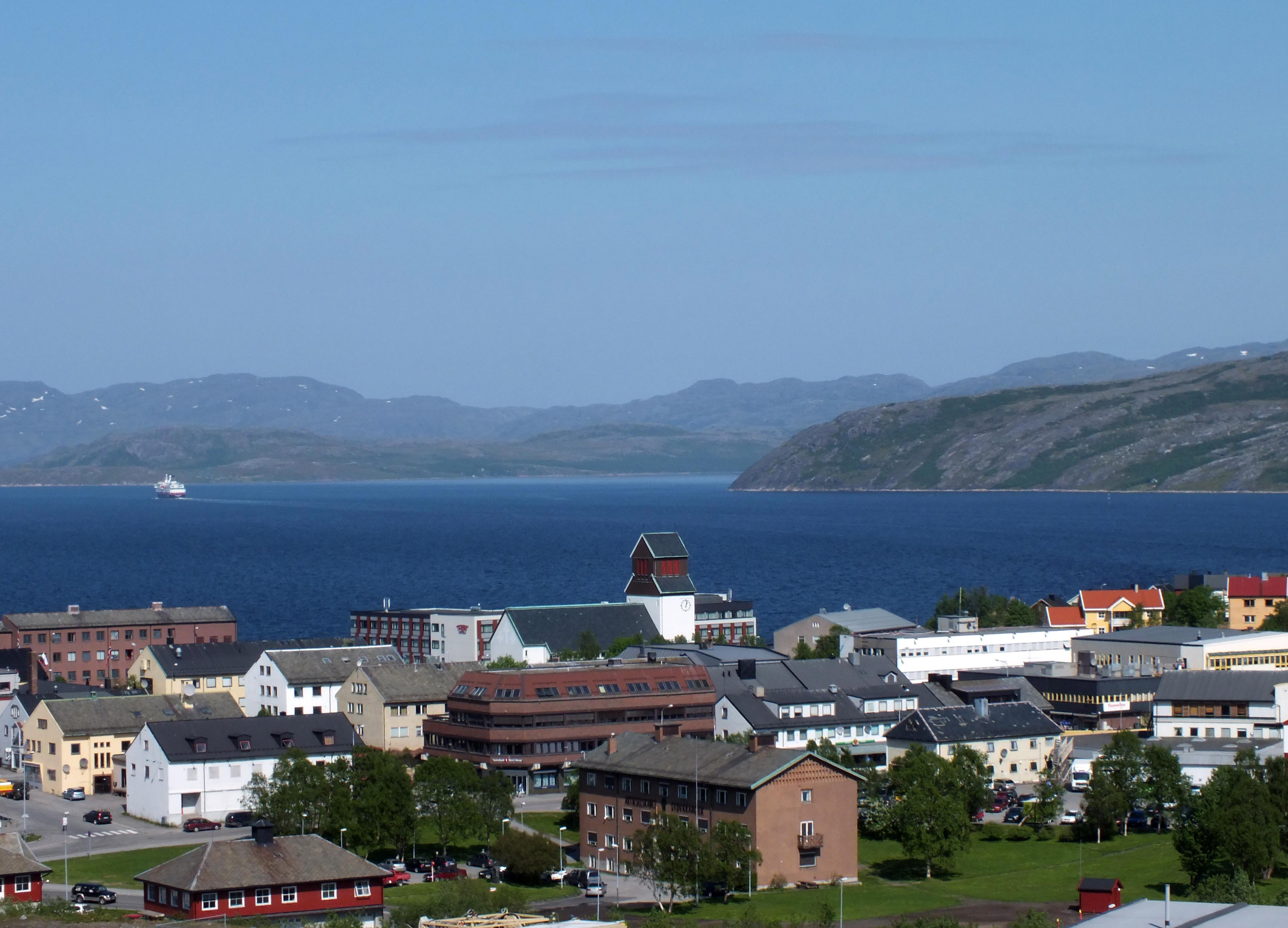
View of Kirkenes

Unlike the vast majority of Norway, Kirkenes is located east of the neighbouring country of Finland. Because of this, travelling directly west from Kirkenes actually changes the time zone forwards instead of backwards, as it usually does. Travelling directly east from Kirkenes (into Russia) changes the time zone forward by an hour in summer, but by two in winter. When Russia implemented permanent daylight saving time between 2011 and 2014, there was a three-hour difference travelling forward from the eastern part of the municipality to westerly Russian areas during winter. Kirkenes shares time zone with areas much further west, e.g. Galicia in Spain which has a solar time difference of 2 1/2 hours.

One can drive 100 kilometres (60 miles) south, and walk ten kilometres (6 mi), into the Øvre Pasvik National Park, reaching the border point of the three countries (Muotkavaara), where the three time zones meet. There are only a few such places in the world. It is forbidden, according to both Norwegian and Russian law, to circumambulate the border marker, as the only lawful route across the Norwegian–Russian border is at the border control at Storskog.

=== Climate ===
The midnight sun shines from May 18 to July 25. The corresponding polar night extends from November 27 to January 14. Despite its location at the coast, Kirkenes exhibits a more continental subarctic climate (Dfc) than further west along the Northern Norwegian coast. This is due to less maritime air from the west reaching across the land east to Kirkenes. The all-time high 32.7 °C (91 °F) was recorded in July 1972 and the record low −41.8 °C (−43 °F) in January 1999. The coldest low after 2000 was −32.7 °C (−27 °F) in February 2003. The vegetation is northern taiga, with forest of pine and birch. The average date for the last overnight freeze (low below 0 °C (32.0 °F)) in spring is 26 May and average date for first freeze in autumn is 22 September giving a frost-free season of 116 days (Kirkenes Airport, 1981–2010 average). Kirkenes Airport is situated 5 km outside the town and has been recording since 1940.

Climate data for Kirkenes 1991–2020, extremes 1957–2023 (89 m)
Month	Jan	Feb	Mar	Apr	May	Jun	Jul	Aug	Sep	Oct	Nov	Dec	Year
Record high °C (°F)	5.3 (41.5)	7.3 (45.1)	6.8 (44.2)	14.4 (57.9)	28.8 (83.8)	31.6 (88.9)	32.7 (90.9)	30.7 (87.3)	22.2 (72.0)	14 (57)	11.6 (52.9)	7 (45)	32.7 (90.9)
Mean daily maximum °C (°F)	−6.4 (20.5)	−6.5 (20.3)	−2.8 (27.0)	1.7 (35.1)	7.4 (45.3)	12.4 (54.3)	16.4 (61.5)	14.8 (58.6)	10.2 (50.4)	3.2 (37.8)	−1.9 (28.6)	−4.3 (24.3)	3.7 (38.6)
Daily mean °C (°F)	−10.1 (13.8)	−9.9 (14.2)	−5.6 (21.9)	−0.8 (30.6)	4.3 (39.7)	8.7 (47.7)	12.4 (54.3)	11.3 (52.3)	7.3 (45.1)	1.2 (34.2)	−4.4 (24.1)	−7.3 (18.9)	0.6 (33.1)
Mean daily minimum °C (°F)	−13.6 (7.5)	−13.3 (8.1)	−9.2 (15.4)	−4.2 (24.4)	1.1 (34.0)	5.5 (41.9)	9.1 (48.4)	8.3 (46.9)	4.7 (40.5)	−0.9 (30.4)	−7.2 (19.0)	−10.6 (12.9)	−2.5 (27.5)
Record low °C (°F)	−41.8 (−43.2)	−38.9 (−38.0)	−29.8 (−21.6)	−20.9 (−5.6)	−13.6 (7.5)	−2.5 (27.5)	2.4 (36.3)	−1.5 (29.3)	−5.9 (21.4)	−21.7 (−7.1)	−27.5 (−17.5)	−34 (−29)	−41.8 (−43.2)
Average precipitation mm (inches)	31 (1.2)	30 (1.2)	29 (1.1)	27 (1.1)	27 (1.1)	49 (1.9)	56 (2.2)	55 (2.2)	38 (1.5)	44 (1.7)	37 (1.5)	33 (1.3)	456 (18)
Average precipitation days (≥ 1.0 mm)	9.4	7.3	6.8	6.5	6.3	7.6	9.0	9.7	8.0	10.2	9.3	8.5	98.6
Source 1: Eklima
Source 2: NOAA – WMO averages 91-2020 Norway

Climate data for Kirkenes Airport (2002–2020 averages & extremes; precipitation from Neiden since 2005)
Month	Jan	Feb	Mar	Apr	May	Jun	Jul	Aug	Sep	Oct	Nov	Dec	Year
Record high °C (°F)	5.1 (41.2)	4.7 (40.5)	6.1 (43.0)	14.2 (57.6)	28.8 (83.8)	28.7 (83.7)	31.3 (88.3)	30.7 (87.3)	22.2 (72.0)	13.6 (56.5)	7.0 (44.6)	7.0 (44.6)	31.3 (88.3)
Mean maximum °C (°F)	1.8 (35.2)	1.9 (35.4)	3.2 (37.8)	8.5 (47.3)	18.6 (65.5)	23.0 (73.4)	25.7 (78.3)	23.9 (75.0)	17.4 (63.3)	9.5 (49.1)	4.1 (39.4)	2.8 (37.0)	26.5 (79.7)
Mean daily maximum °C (°F)	−6.9 (19.6)	−6.5 (20.3)	−2.7 (27.1)	2.3 (36.1)	8.2 (46.8)	12.5 (54.5)	16.8 (62.2)	14.9 (58.8)	10.5 (50.9)	3.5 (38.3)	−1.4 (29.5)	−3.6 (25.5)	4.0 (39.1)
Daily mean °C (°F)	−10.5 (13.1)	−9.8 (14.4)	−5.9 (21.4)	−0.6 (30.9)	4.9 (40.8)	9.2 (48.6)	13.1 (55.6)	11.7 (53.1)	7.8 (46.0)	1.6 (34.9)	−3.9 (25.0)	−6.8 (19.8)	0.9 (33.6)
Mean daily minimum °C (°F)	−14.0 (6.8)	−13.1 (8.4)	−9.0 (15.8)	−3.4 (25.9)	1.6 (34.9)	5.8 (42.4)	9.4 (48.9)	8.4 (47.1)	5.0 (41.0)	−0.4 (31.3)	−6.4 (20.5)	−10.0 (14.0)	−2.2 (28.1)
Mean minimum °C (°F)	−26.9 (−16.4)	−25.7 (−14.3)	−20.1 (−4.2)	−12.9 (8.8)	−3.4 (25.9)	1.4 (34.5)	5.5 (41.9)	3.7 (38.7)	−0.5 (31.1)	−8.7 (16.3)	−16.7 (1.9)	−20.1 (−4.2)	−29.1 (−20.4)
Record low °C (°F)	−31.5 (−24.7)	−32.7 (−26.9)	−30.0 (−22.0)	−19.3 (−2.7)	−7.3 (18.9)	−0.6 (30.9)	3.2 (37.8)	−0.7 (30.7)	−4.3 (24.3)	−17.0 (1.4)	−27.5 (−17.5)	−29.1 (−20.4)	−32.7 (−26.9)
Average precipitation mm (inches)	34.9 (1.37)	24.0 (0.94)	24.0 (0.94)	21.5 (0.85)	32.5 (1.28)	48.8 (1.92)	65.0 (2.56)	59.0 (2.32)	45.1 (1.78)	41.4 (1.63)	31.3 (1.23)	35.9 (1.41)	463.4 (18.23)
Source: Norsk Klimaservicesenter

== Demographics ==
The majority of the people of Kirkenes are of a Norwegian background, and a minority are Sami. Others are originally from Finland, either members of the Kven population or of a newer influx of more or less recent Finnish immigrants. Also, about 500 people are relatively recent Russian immigrants. For several months in 2015, the town served as a border crossing point for Syrian refugees, with hundreds per week crossing the border on bicycles, traveling into Norway from Russia (via Murmansk and Nikel).

== Economy and tourism ==
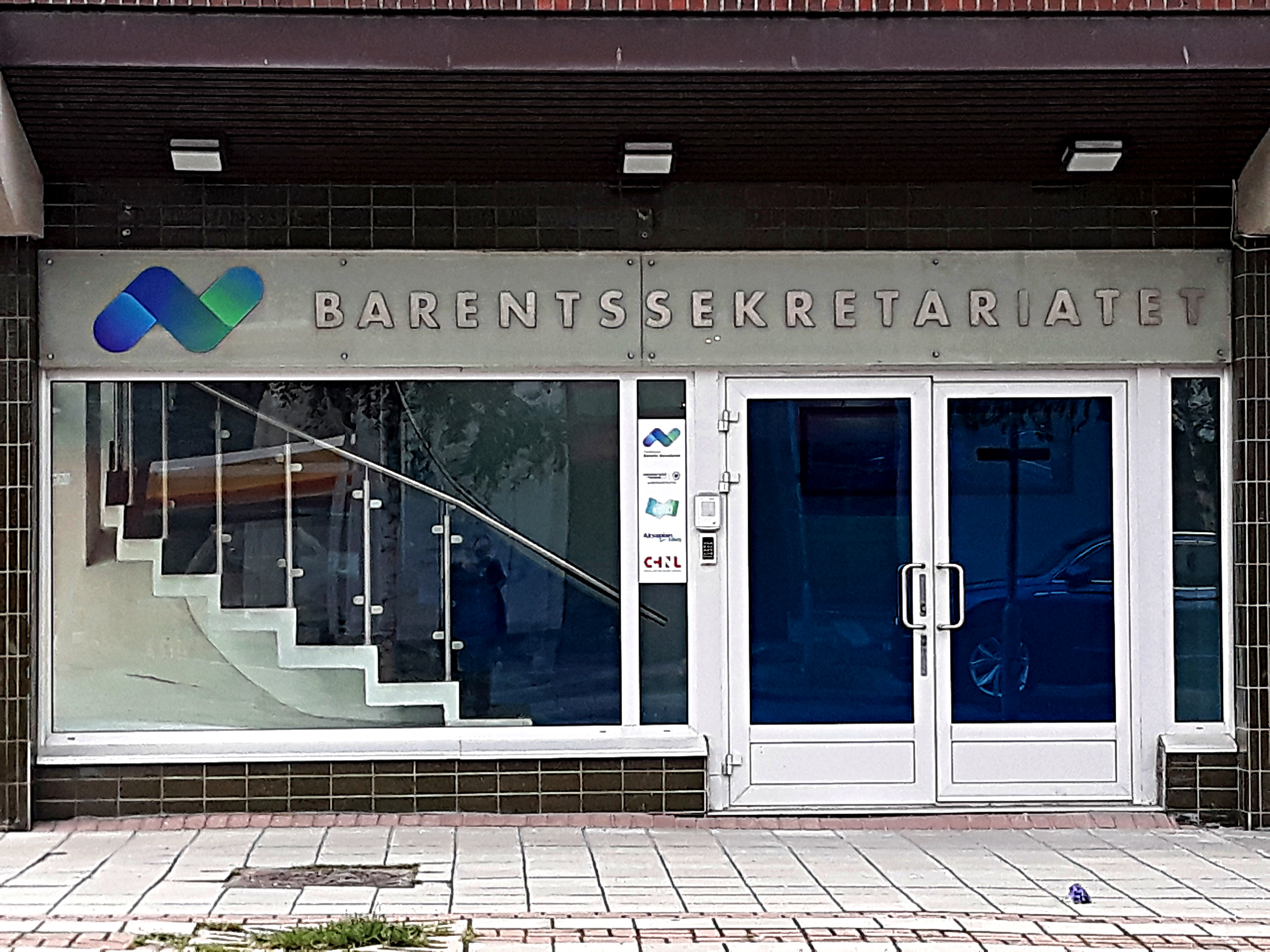
The headquarters of the Norwegian Barents Secretariat in Kirkenes, Norway in August 2019 Photo: Kimberli Mäkäräinen

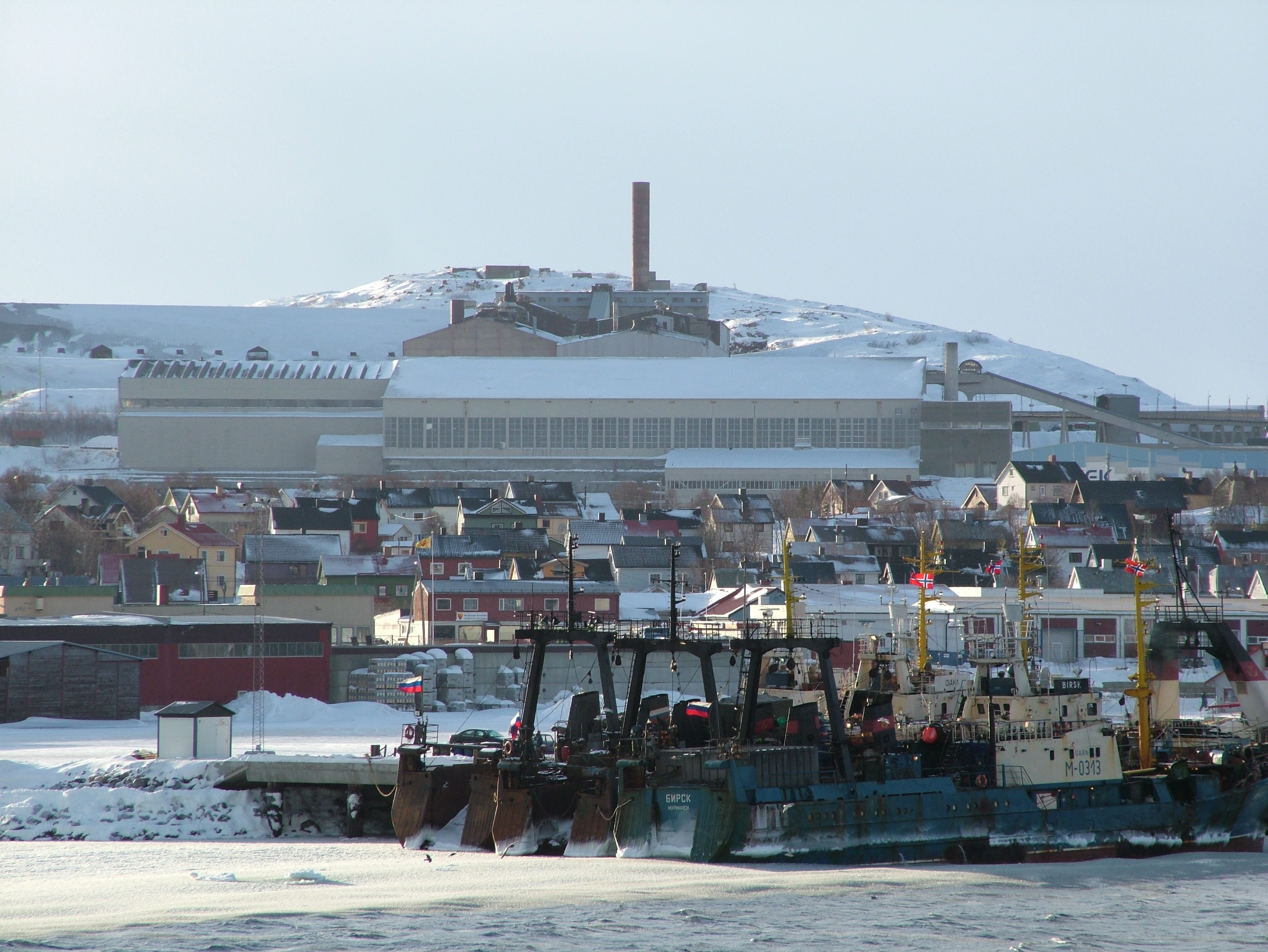
Kirkenes seaport

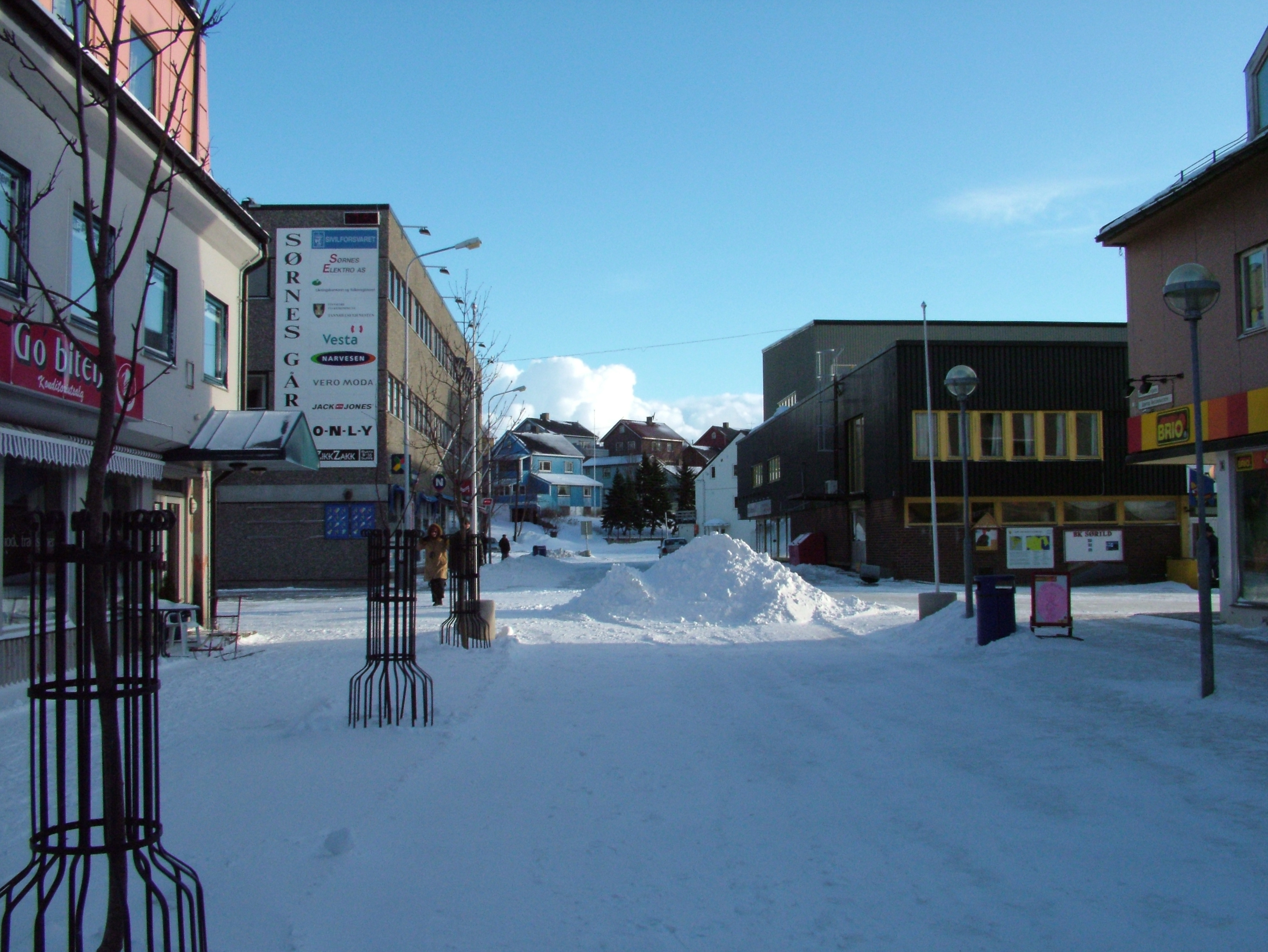
Pedestrian street in the centre

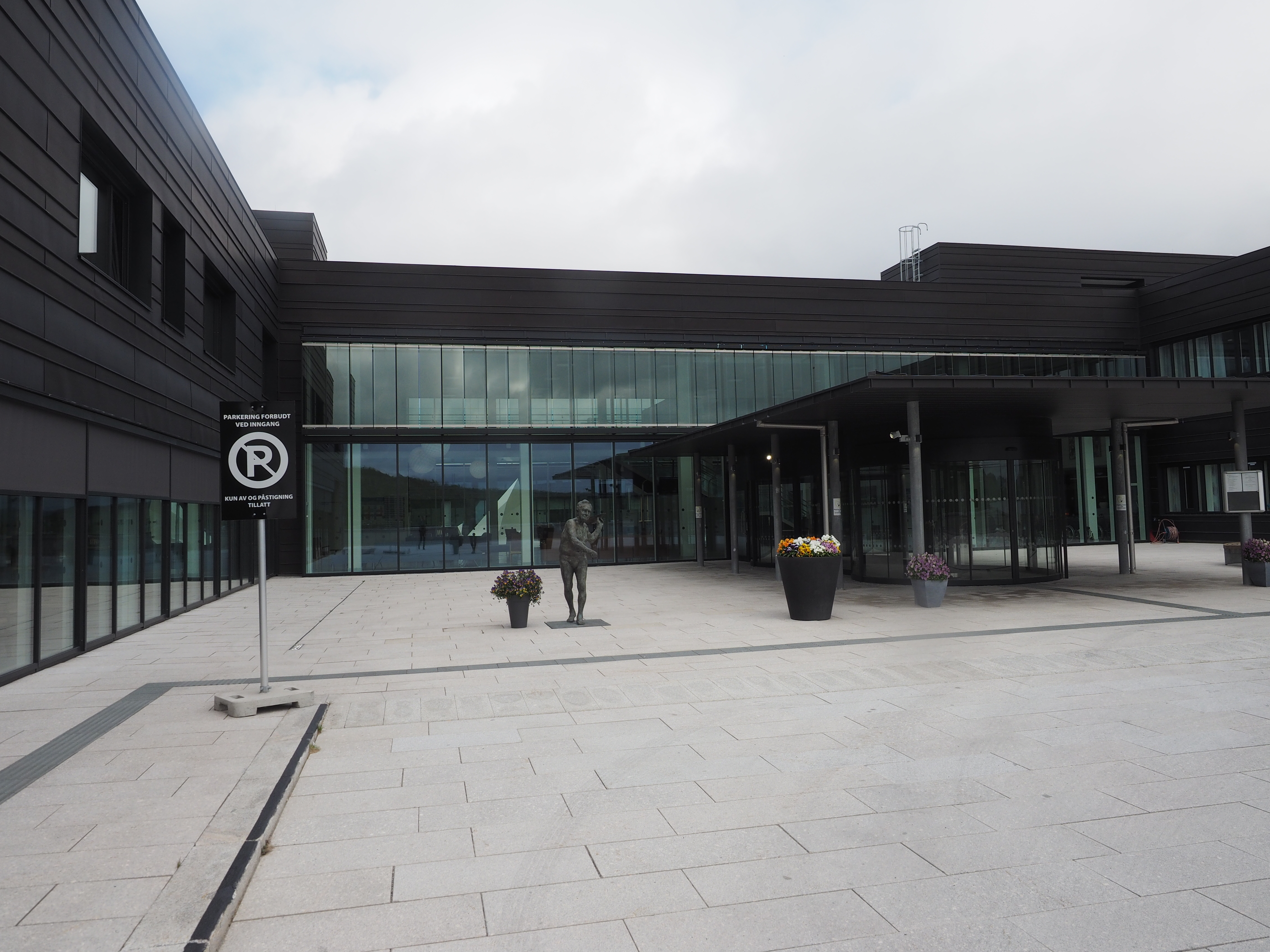
A hospital in Kirkenes

Kirkenes is close to Norway's border with Russia, and this location influences the local economy. The Norwegian Barents Secretariat, which works to promote Norwegian-Russian collaboration, is located in Kirkenes.

In 2010, Norway's and Russia's Foreign Ministers signed an agreement that made it easier for 9,000 Norwegians and 45,000 Russians living near the common border to visit each other.

Tourist attractions include Grenselandmuseet (The Border Area Museum), which shows the history of war and peace along the Norwegian–Russian border, Sami art exhibitions by the artist John Savio (1902–1938), and a history of the mining industry in the area. King crab safaris on the Barents Sea have also become a popular winter tourism activity in the region. The museum has a small shop and café. Almost every last Thursday of each month the Russian Market takes place on the central square where traders from Murmansk sell their merchandise. Here you can find everything from matryoshkas, linen cloths, and handicrafts, to Russian crystal and porcelain dishes.

Just outside Kirkenes is a military base that is home to the Garrison of Sør-Varanger at Høybuktmoen. Connected to this base are the six border stations along the Russian border. This base and these border stations are there to protect against illegal immigrants as well as other illegal activities across the border. The only public border crossing is at Storskog, southeast of Kirkenes. In October 2023, Norway banned the entry of Russian vehicles with less than 10 seats. In May 2024, Norway closed the entire border for Russian tourists. After this, only a Mercedes van is allowed to cross the border, driving from Norway's Kirkenes to the Russian town of Murmansk once a day.

In the city centre of Kirkenes is Andersgrotta, a vast underground bunker built during World War II that provided shelter to the town's residents. Tours of the bunker are available.

A pride parade held in 2017 in Kirkenes attracted participants from neighbouring Russia, who were unwilling to participate in LGBT events in Russia due to hostility from the government and police. In addition, the parade saw participants from Amnesty International and the Norwegian Helsinki Committee.

Kirkenes's location on the Northeast Passage and the effect of climate change on sea ice have led to expressions of interest to develop a seaport and transport infrastructure in the town, including from state-owned enterprises of China. Public reception to such projects in Kirkenes is mixed.

== Transportation ==
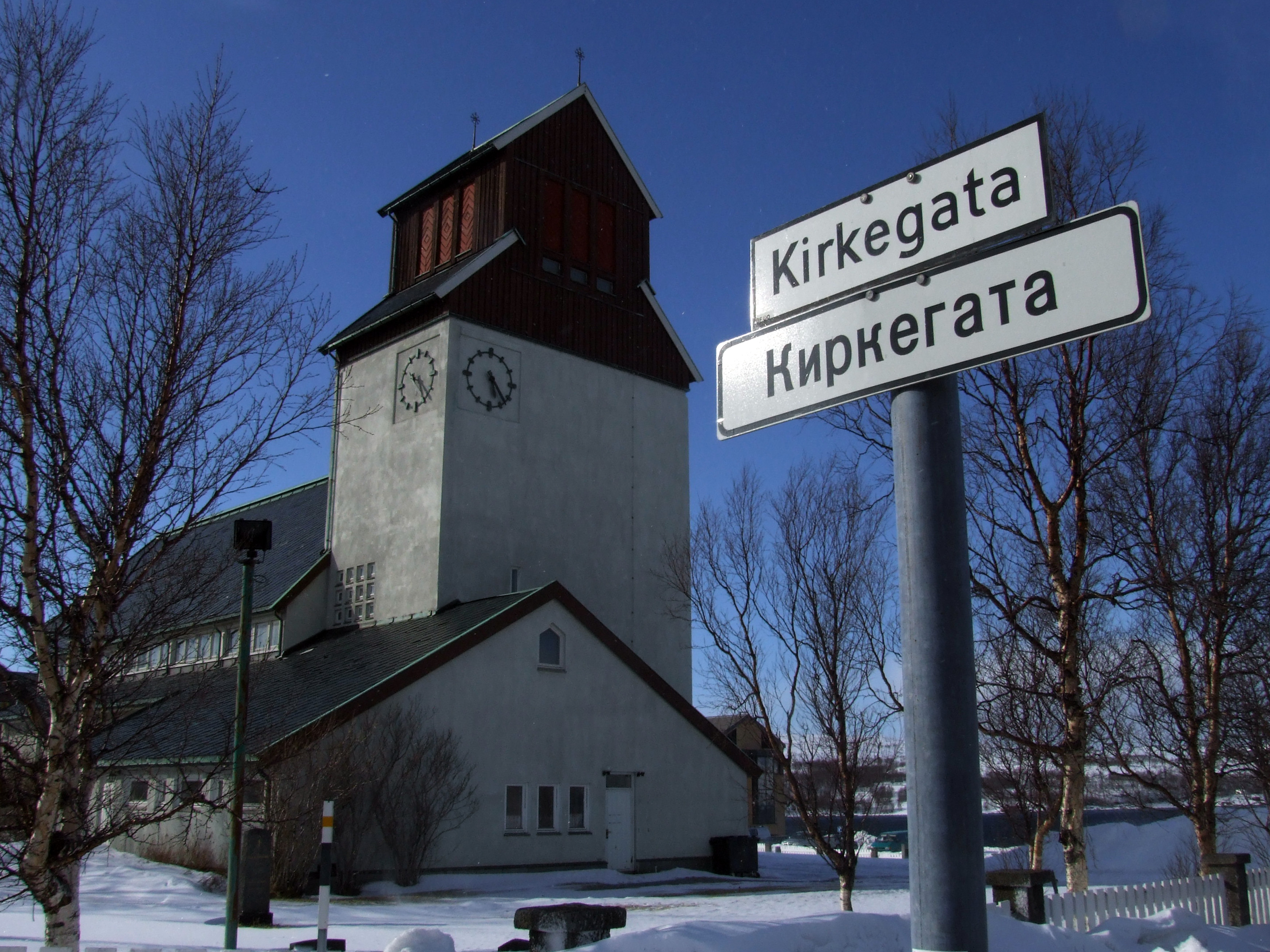
Kirkenes Church with roadsigns in Norwegian and Russian

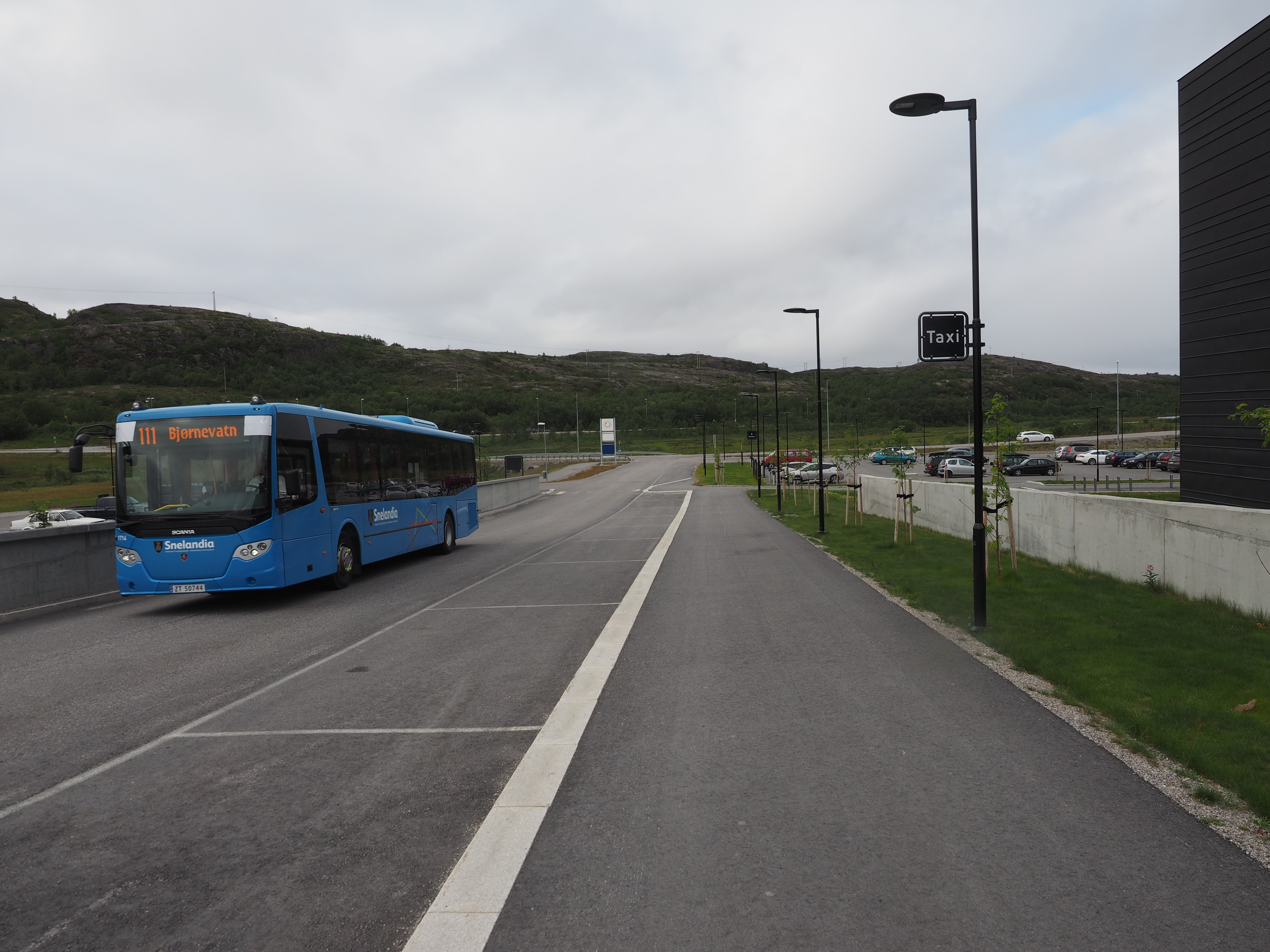
A bus to Bjørnevatn in Kirkenes

Kirkenes is one end of the route of the Hurtigruten, which cruises daily up and down the Norway coast to and from Bergen. Kirkenes is served by Kirkenes Airport, Høybuktmoen. There are non-stop flights to Oslo, Vadsø, Vardø, Alta and Tromsø. The European route E6 highway has its northern terminus at Kirkenes. The northern terminus of the European route E105 highway is located in Hesseng, just south of the town.

Kirkenes is also the terminus of Kirkenes–Bjørnevatn Line, the world's second-most northerly railway line, used to transport iron ore from the mines at Bjørnevatn to the port at Kirkenes. The proposed Arctic Railway would see Kirkenes connected with northern Finland.

The town of Kirkenes is also the starting point of EV13 The Iron Curtain Trail, a cycling route that runs along the historic border between the capitalist West and the communist East during the Cold War.

== Religion ==
The main church for Kirkenes is Kirkenes Church, located in the Haganes area of the town.

== Sister cities ==
- Nikel, Murmansk Oblast, Russia
- Kars, Kars Province, Turkey
- Zugló, Hungary (2024)

== Notable people ==
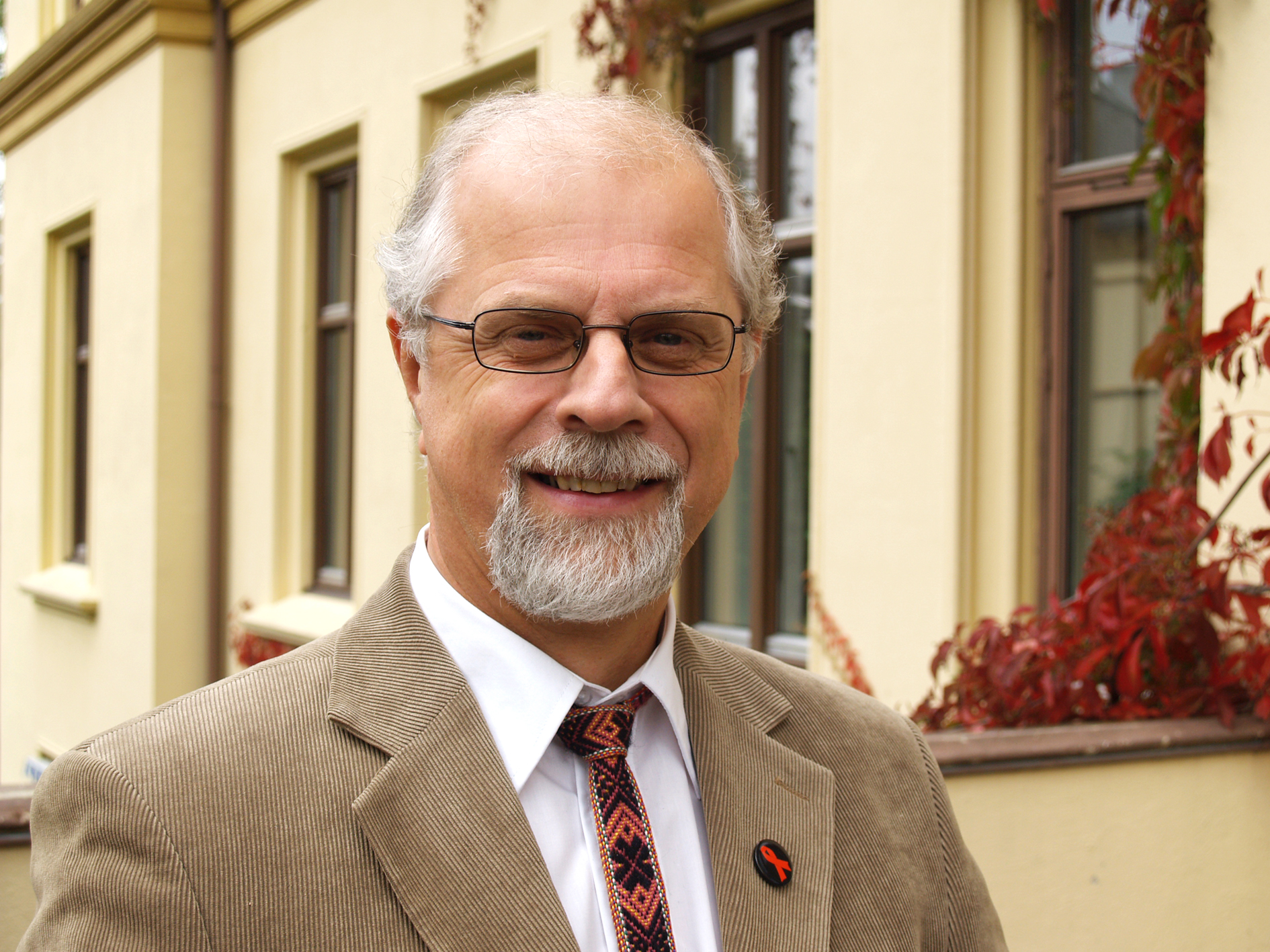
Per Oskar Kjølaas, 2006

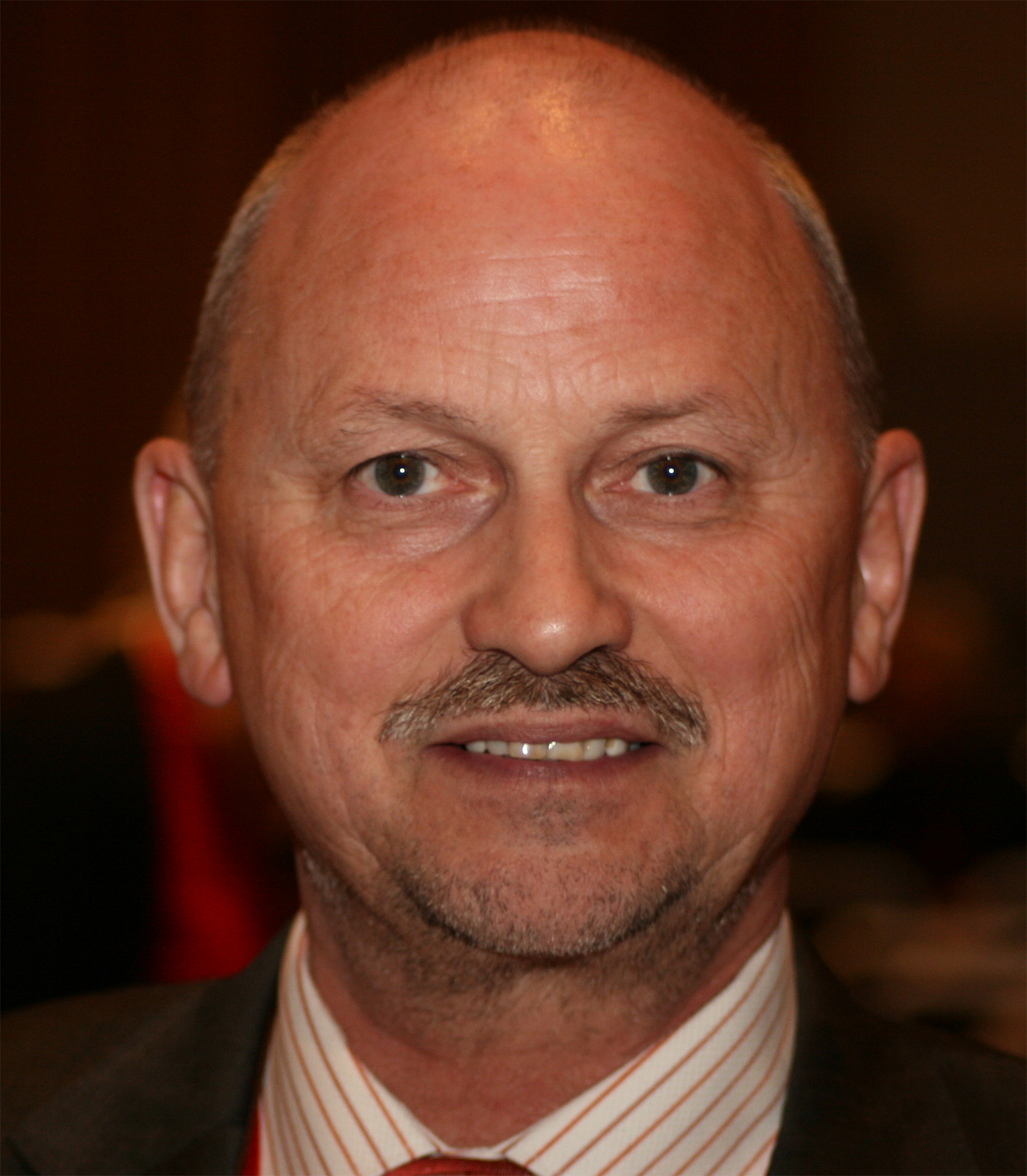
Roger Ryberg, 2009

- Turid Balke (1921–2000), an actress, playwright, and artist
- Arnfinn Laudal (born 1936), a mathematician
- Per Oskar Kjølaas (born 1948), the Bishop of the Diocese of Nord-Hålogaland from 2002 to 2014
- Roger Ryberg (born 1952), a Norwegian politician
- Morten Strøksnes (born 1965), a journalist and non-fiction writer
- Jarle Vespestad (born 1966), a jazz musician
- Simen Johan (born 1973), a Norwegian-Swedish contemporary artist, photographer, and sculptor living in New York City
- Yvonne Wartiainen (born 1976), a painter who mixed figurative shapes with abstract motives
- Ørjan Nilsen (born 1982), a producer and DJ

Sport

- Grethe Mathiesen (born 1956), a swimmer who competed at the 1972 Summer Olympics in the women's 100-metre freestyle
- Kirsten Borgen (born 1957), a sport wrestler
- Vegard Ulvang (born 1963), a cross-country skier who won three Olympic gold medals, two silver, and one bronze
- Vegard Sannes (born 1976), a retired football midfielder with 125 club caps with FK Bodø/Glimt
- John Kristian Dahl (born 1981), a three-time Vasaloppet winner

== See also ==
- List of towns and cities in Norway
- Nazi concentration camps in Norway
