= Kirkenes Church =

- Kirkenes kirke
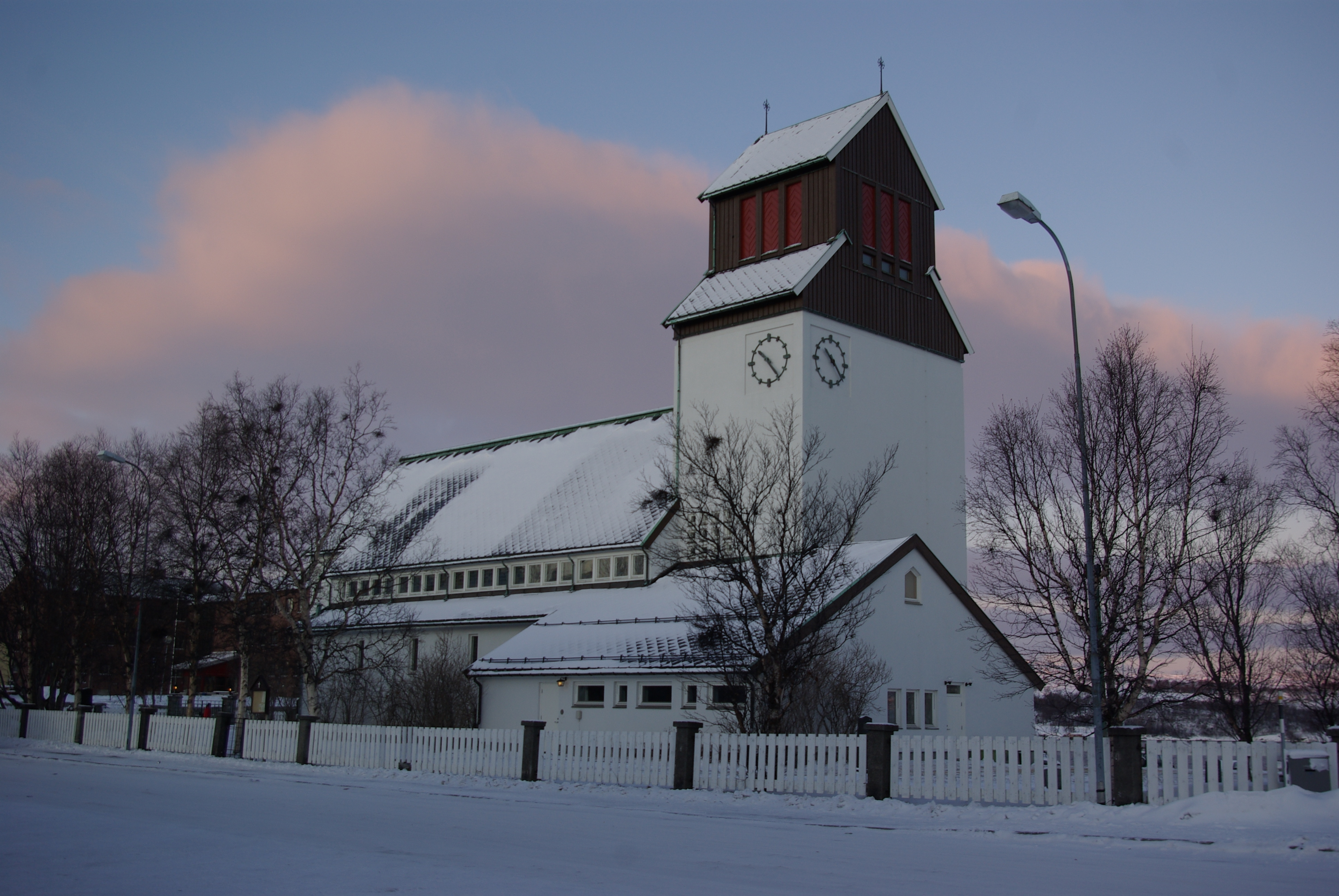
- View of the church
- Kirkenes Church
- 69.7283°N 30.0441°E
- Location: Sør-Varanger, Finnmark
- Country: Norway
- Denomination: Church of Norway
- Churchmanship: Evangelical Lutheran

History
- Former name: Syd-Varanger kirke
- Status: Parish church
- Founded: 1862
- Consecrated: 1959

Architecture
- Functional status: Active
- Architect: Sofus Hougen
- Architectural type: Long church
- Completed: 1959 (67 years ago)

Specifications
- Capacity: 275
- Materials: Concrete

Administration
- Diocese: Nord-Hålogaland
- Deanery: Varanger prosti
- Parish: Sør-Varanger
- Norwegian Cultural Heritage Site
- Type: Church
- Status: Not protected
- ID: 84779

Kirkenes Church (Norwegian: Kirkenes kirke) is a parish church of the Church of Norway in Sør-Varanger Municipality in Finnmark county, Norway. It is located in the town of Kirkenes, just off the European route E06 highway. It is one of the churches for the Sør-Varanger parish which is part of the Varanger prosti (deanery) in the Diocese of Nord-Hålogaland. The white, concrete church was built in a long church style in 1959 by the architect Sofus Hougen. The church seats about 275 people.

== History ==
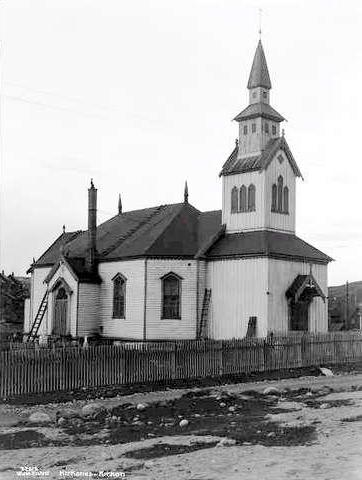
The original church photographed in 1928. This building burned to the ground during World War II after heavy bombing. Photograph: Anders Beer Wilse

In 1857, it was decided that a church should be built on the southern side of the Varangerfjorden. After some discussion about the exact location to build on, planners settled on a site on the Piselvnes peninsula (Pis River headland) at the mouth of the Pasvikelva river where it meets the Bøkfjorden. The parish was named Sydvaranger (meaning South-Varanger), and after the church was built its site was renamed Kirkenes (church headland), from which the present-day town received its name.

The first church building was completed in 1862. It stood almost until the end of World War II, when in 1944 it was subjected to heavy bombing and burned to the ground. The old church spire survived, though, and was incorporated into its replacement.

Rebuilding took fifteen years. The architectural drawings by Sofus Hougen followed a traditional long church design, in the form of a basilica, divided longitudinally into three sections by columns and rows, with a raised central peak and tower raised over the choir. As was common to two-thirds of post-war church construction in Norway, reinforced concrete bricks were used as a principal material, along with wood fashioned by modern milling techniques. Interior decoration and furnishings reflect a traditional strongly sacred character. The present church building was finally completed in 1959.

== Media gallery ==
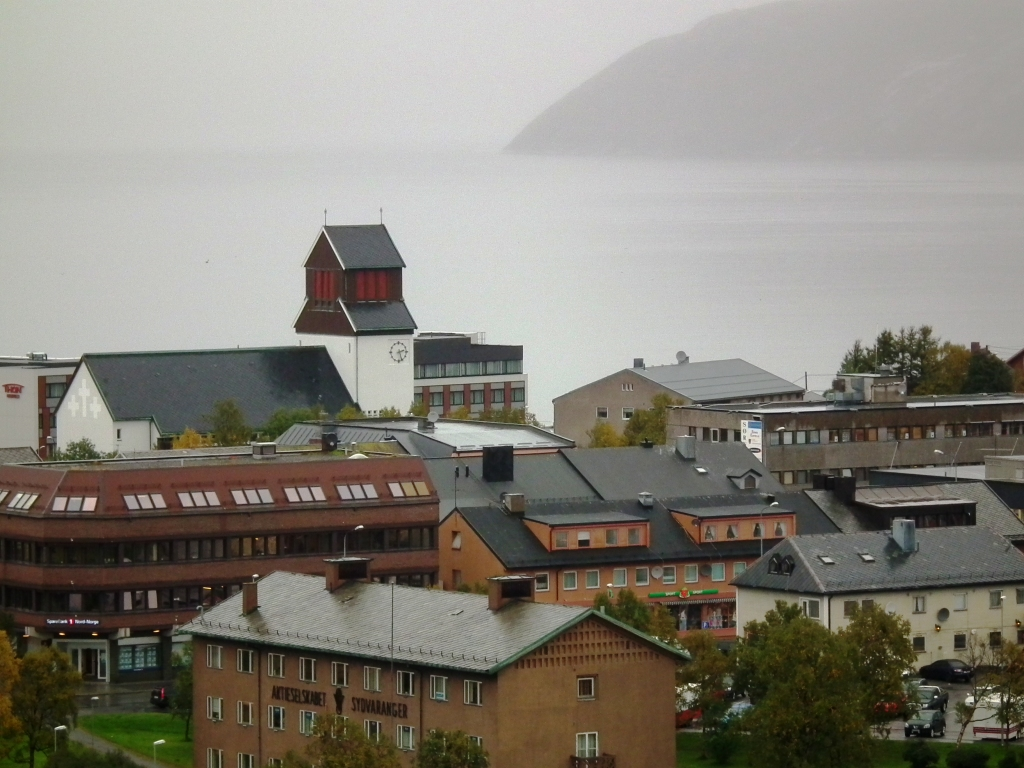

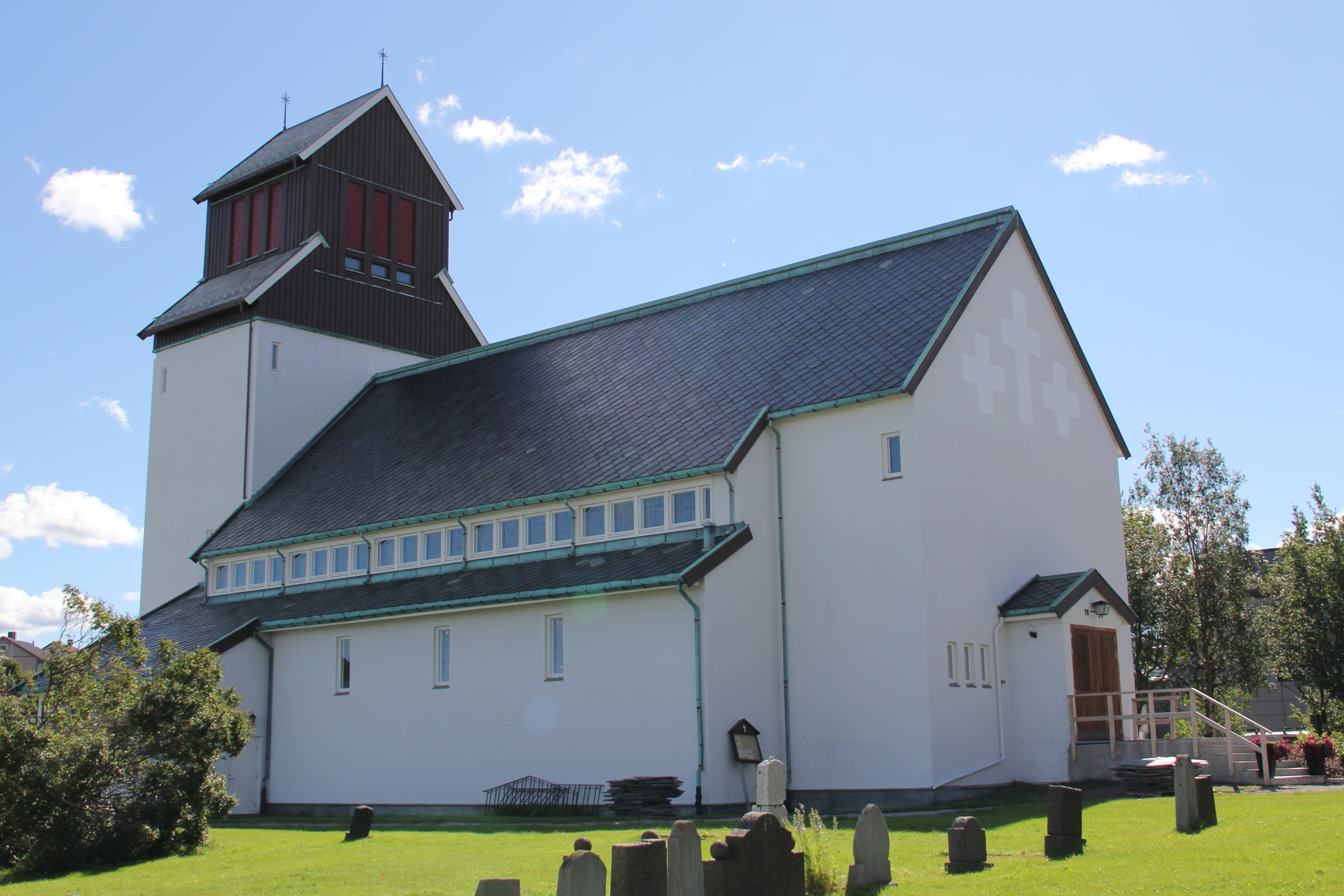

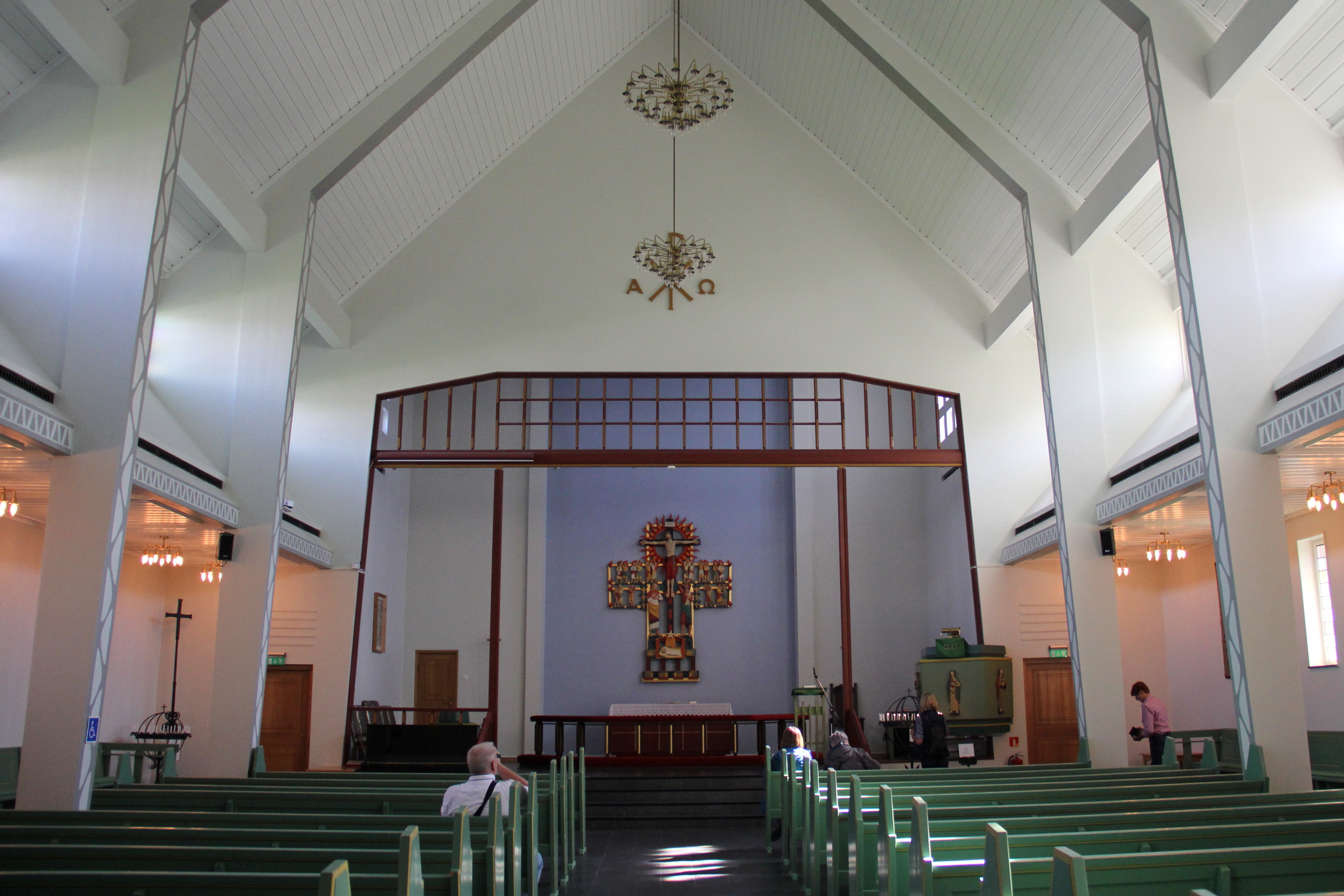

== See also ==
- List of churches in Nord-Hålogaland
