= Simen Johan =

American artist, photographer and sculptor

- Born: 1973 (age 52–53); Kirkenes, Norway
- Education: School of Visual Arts
- Known for: Photography, sculpture
- Website: www.simenjohan.com

Simen Johan (born 1973) is a contemporary artist, photographer and sculptor, living in New York City.

== Early life and education ==
Simen Johan was born in Kirkenes, in the extreme north of Norway and is of Sámi descent. He moved to Höllviken, Sweden in 1979. After attending film school at Lugnetskolan in Falun, Sweden, Johan moved to New York City in 1992 to continue his studies at School of Visual Arts, where he studied under Duane Michals, James Casebere, and Gregory Crewdson.

== Early work ==
In 1993, Johan drew attention for his work merging digital manipulation with traditional darkroom techniques. At a time when digital photo processing was in its infancy, Johan found ways to exploit the medium beyond the boundaries of what was then considered possible. His images recombined fragments of faces and bodies (including his own) into new characters, which he then situated into similarly fabricated scenes. By collaborating with a medical lab, Johan was able to produce "negatives", allowing him to use traditional darkroom processes to create sepia toned silver gelatin prints. By the mid-90s, his work was frequently featured in exhibitions spearheading digital art, including Bit by Bit: Postphotographic Imaging, at Hunter College, New York, and (R)evolution, at Museo della Scienza e della Tecnologia "Leonardo da Vinci" in Milan, Italy.

== Later work and career ==
Until the Kingdom Comes, 2011

With his series Evidence of Things Unseen (2000-2004), Johan began creating large format color prints. In a review for The Village Voice, Vince Aletti wrote: "Johan's...new pictures continue to plumb a troubled dream world where fantasy and ritual meet. In virtually all of these images, solitary, self-possessed youngsters appear to be engaged in bizarre masquerades... There's an edge of horror and derangement in these photos that's all the more disturbing because it seems as much a projection of the child's imagination as the photographer's." A traveling museum exhibition of this series was organized by Kunstnernes Hus in Oslo, Norway, and the National Art Museum of Lithuania.

In 2005, Johan shifted his focus towards the natural world, at the same time also beginning to create sculptural works. The images in his series Until the Kingdom Comes incorporate elements photographed in a wide variety of locations around the world, including both wild and captive animals. According to the New Yorker, "At nearly six feet by eight feet, the largest of these pictures rival natural-history dioramas, but very little is natural about this menagerie. A deer in a snowy forest is uncannily white; malevolent snakes curl around sticks and one another in a sunny ravine, like fugitives from Dante's Inferno. Johan undermines even his most convincing fictions, and the nagging sense that something is wrong here keeps viewers just where he wants us: on edge." The sculptures, as featured in the New York Times "incorporate taxidermy, insects and foliage into parasitical eco-systems resonant with the vitality of ritualistic headdresses", while others, shaped like meteorites, were constructed from barnacles, cement and fiber optics. Solo exhibitions of Until the Kingdom Comes were presented at Brown University, Providence, RI; the Frist Center for the Visual Arts, Nashville and at the Southern Methodist University, Dallas, TX. A limited edition book was published in 2014. In 2023, two monographs were published—one by PowerhouseBooks and the other by Rizzoli.

Johan received the New York Foundation for the Arts Fellowship in 2002, the Pollock-Krasner Foundation Grant in 2009 and the George A. and Eliza Gardner Howard Foundation Grant for Photography in 2012. His work has appeared on the covers of Aperture (magazine) and Art+Auction, and he was interviewed on WNYC's Leonard Lopate radio show. In 2010, Comme des Garçons used Johan's sculpture of a long haired wolf for their fall advertising campaign. Louis Vuitton incorporated his work into their spring 2017 ad campaign. His image of a buffalo reclining in littered dirt was featured in Oliver Stone's film Wall Street: Money Never Sleeps. Johan has been represented by the Yossi Milo Gallery since 2000.

== Collections ==
- Brooklyn Museum, Brooklyn, NY
- Cleveland Museum of Art, Cleveland, OH
- Denver Art Museum, Denver, CO
- Herbert F. Johnson Museum of Art, Cornell University, Ithaca, NY
- LaSalle Bank, Chicago, IL
- Los Angeles County Museum of Art, Los Angeles, CA
- The Art Gallery of Ontario, Ontario, Canada
- Museet for Fotokunst – Brandts, Denmark
- Museum of Fine Arts, Houston, TX
- Norsk Museum for Fotografi - Preus Fotomuseum, Norway
- Worcester Art Museum, Worcester, MA
- 21C Museum, Louisville, KY
- Art and Learning Center & Union Gallery, University of Maryland, College Park, MD
- Minneapolis Institute of Art, MN
- Chazen Museum of Art, UW-Madison
