= Yvonne Wartiainen =

Norwegian painter (born 1976)

Yvonne Wartiainen (born in 1976) is a Norwegian painter. She was born in Kirkenes but has been living in Oslo since 1997. Wartiainen's paintings often mix figurative shapes with abstract motives, and her art has been purchased by several large organizations in Norway; including Statoil and Amnesty International.
