= John Savio =

Sami artist

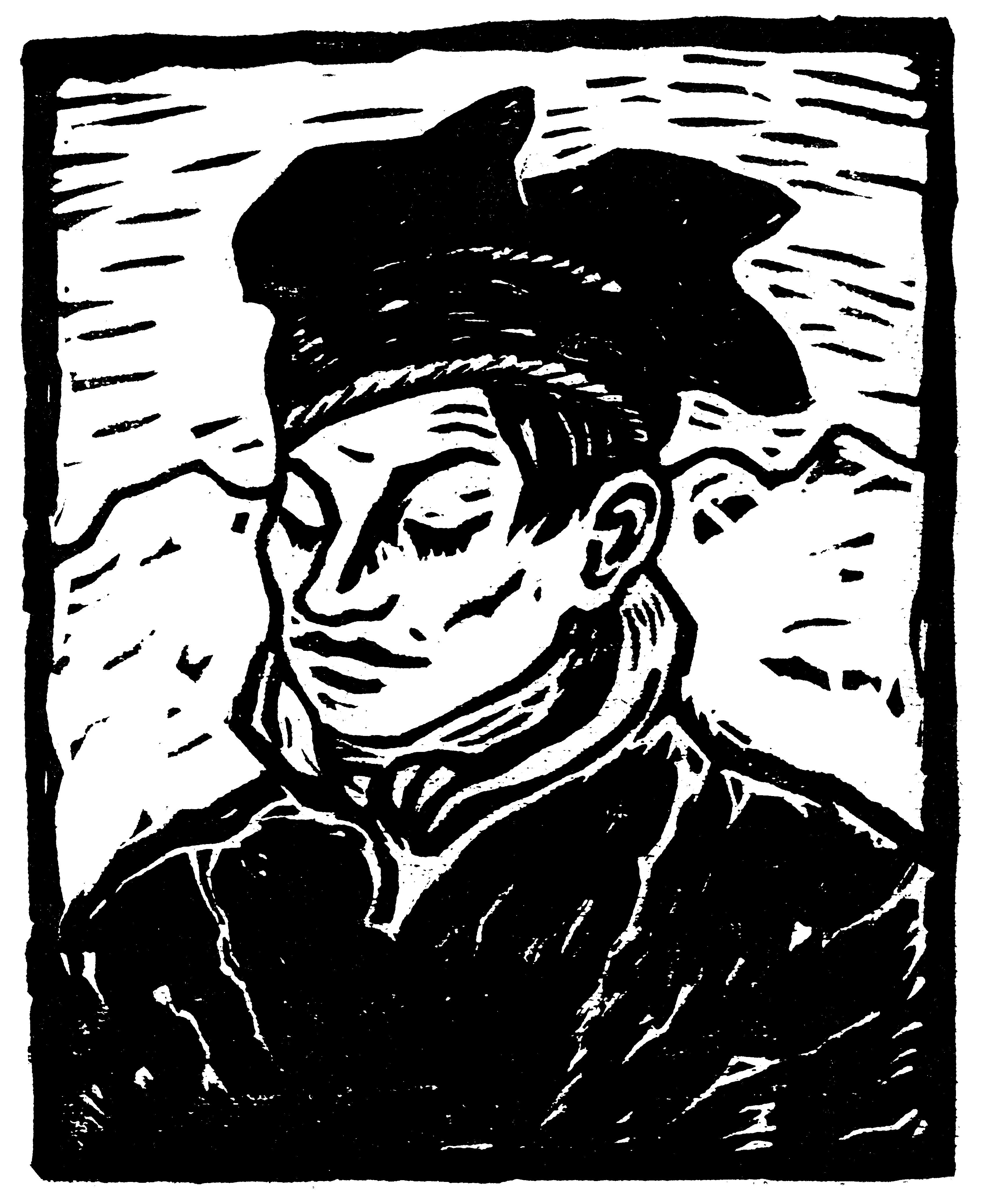
Ganda (Boy). Woodcut by John Savio.

John Andreas Savio (28 January 1902 – 13 April 1938 ) was a Sami artist from Norway who was known for his woodcuts. He is thought to have been autodidact as artist. Savio was the first Sami artist with a formal arts education; he graduated from The Norwegian National Academy of Craft and Art Industry, which is now a part of Oslo National Academy of the Arts.

== Early life ==
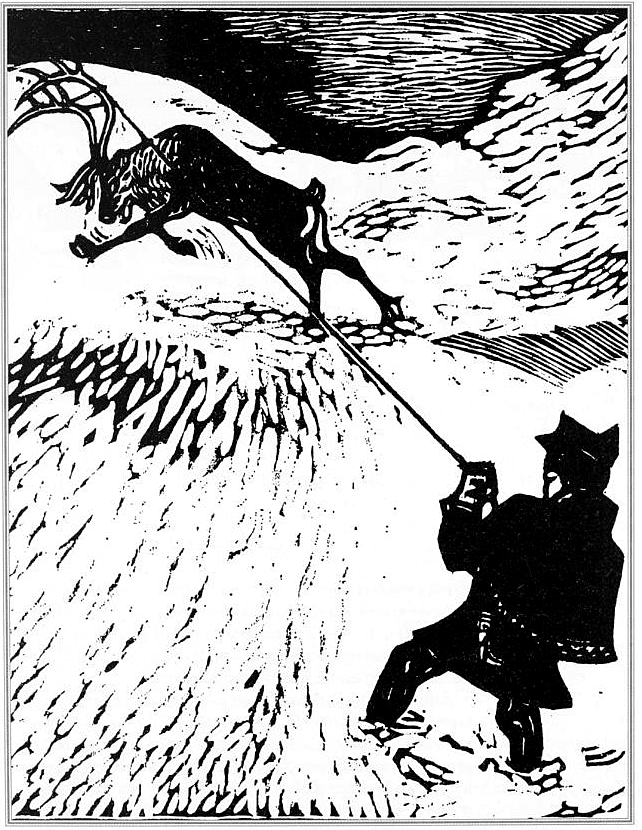
«Man with reindeer»

Savio was born in Bugøyfjord in Sør-Varanger Municipality in Finnmark, Norway. His father was Per Savio, a polar explorer who was one of the first two people to spend a night on the Antarctic continent, and his mother was Ellen Strimp, daughter of a wealthy Sámi merchant. His parents died when he was aged three; first his mother from tuberculosis, then his father from drowning on the Varangerfjord while he was sailing to Vadsø to retrieve his wife's coffin. This left John Savio to be brought up by his maternal grandparents. His grandparents were fairly wealthy by the standards in Finnmark at the time, and they had the means to give the child a good upbringing and education. He was sent to school in Vardø, where he received tutoring in drawing by Isak Saba.

== After attending school in Vardø ==
After Vardø he spent the year 1918–1919 at Kvæfjord Private Middelskole in Borkenes, Kvæfjord Municipality in Troms county. Then he went on to Bodø Gymnas in Bodø, Nordland county, but he only stayed there for a short time before he went to Oslo to study at Ragna Nielsens skole in 1920. In Oslo he also took courses at Statens håndverks- og kunstindustriskole that year, but he became ill with tuberculosis and had to quit school. He had to get a lung removed, and he was hospitalised for months. He just barely recovered, and the poor health hampered him for the rest of his life. After recovering he went back to Oslo for a short time, before he went back north to Finnmark to try to obtain his inheritance from his now dead grandfather. He found that much of the money had been lost, but he still received some money.

== Artist's life ==
The next years he travelled around in Finnmark, making prints, drawings and paintings. In the early 1930s he travelled in Western Norway and Northern Norway. 1934(-1936?) Savio visited Munich and Cologne and spent about a year in Paris. During his life he had only a few exhibitions, two in Tromsø, and one in Paris. He spent much time knocking on doors trying to find buyers for his art. He sold his prints very cheaply, just to get by. At the end of his life he moved to Oslo again, where he lived in poverty.

He "devoted his work to life on the mountain plateau[s]".

== Illness preceding death ==
During the spring of 1938, he got very ill with tuberculosis again, and he died at Ullevål sykehus on 13 April 1938, at the age of 36. He was buried in Oslo, at Vestre gravlund.

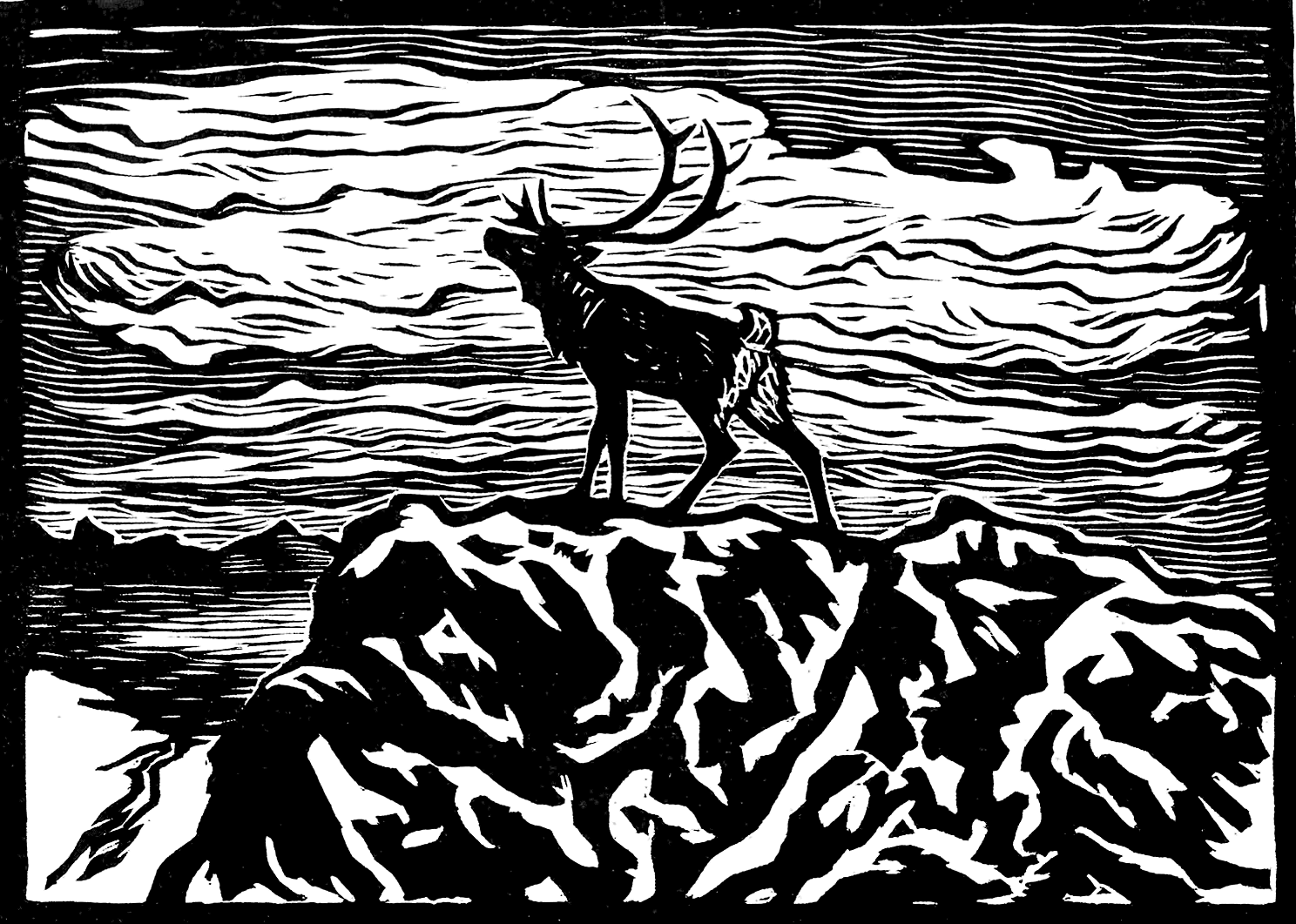
Okto

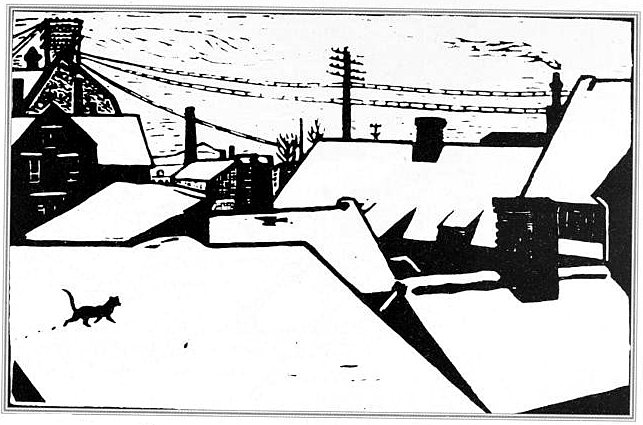
Backyard in Tromsø

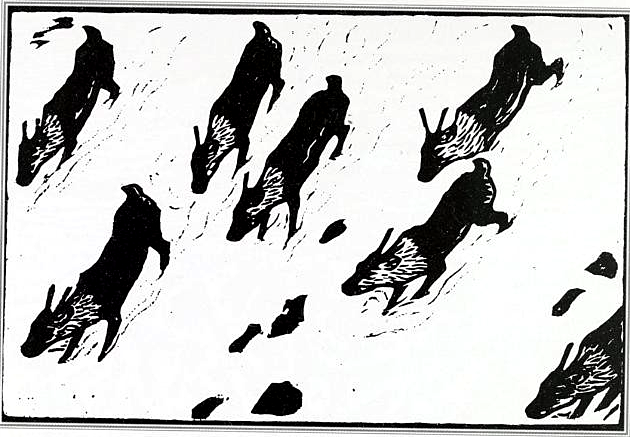
Reindeer calves

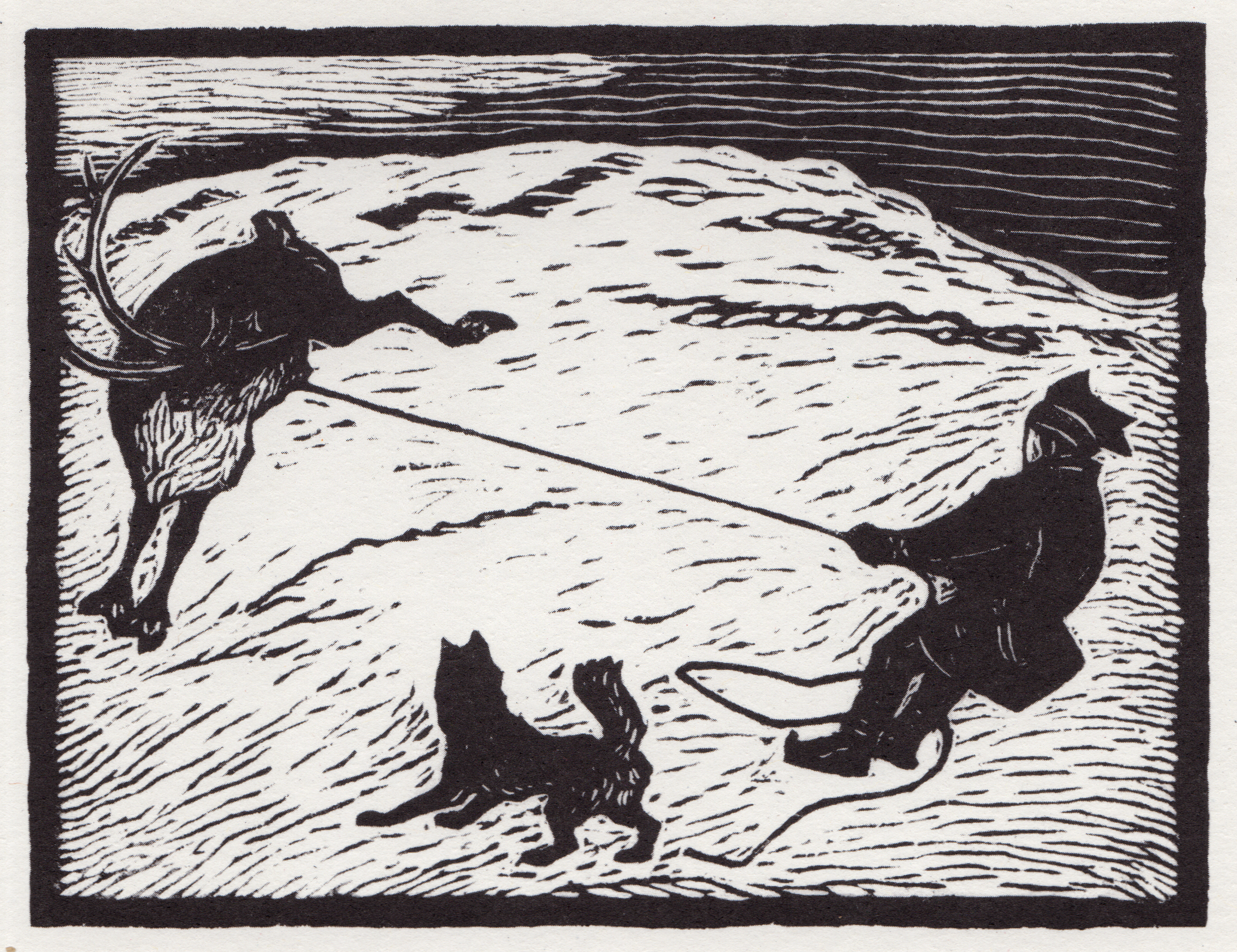
Lasso

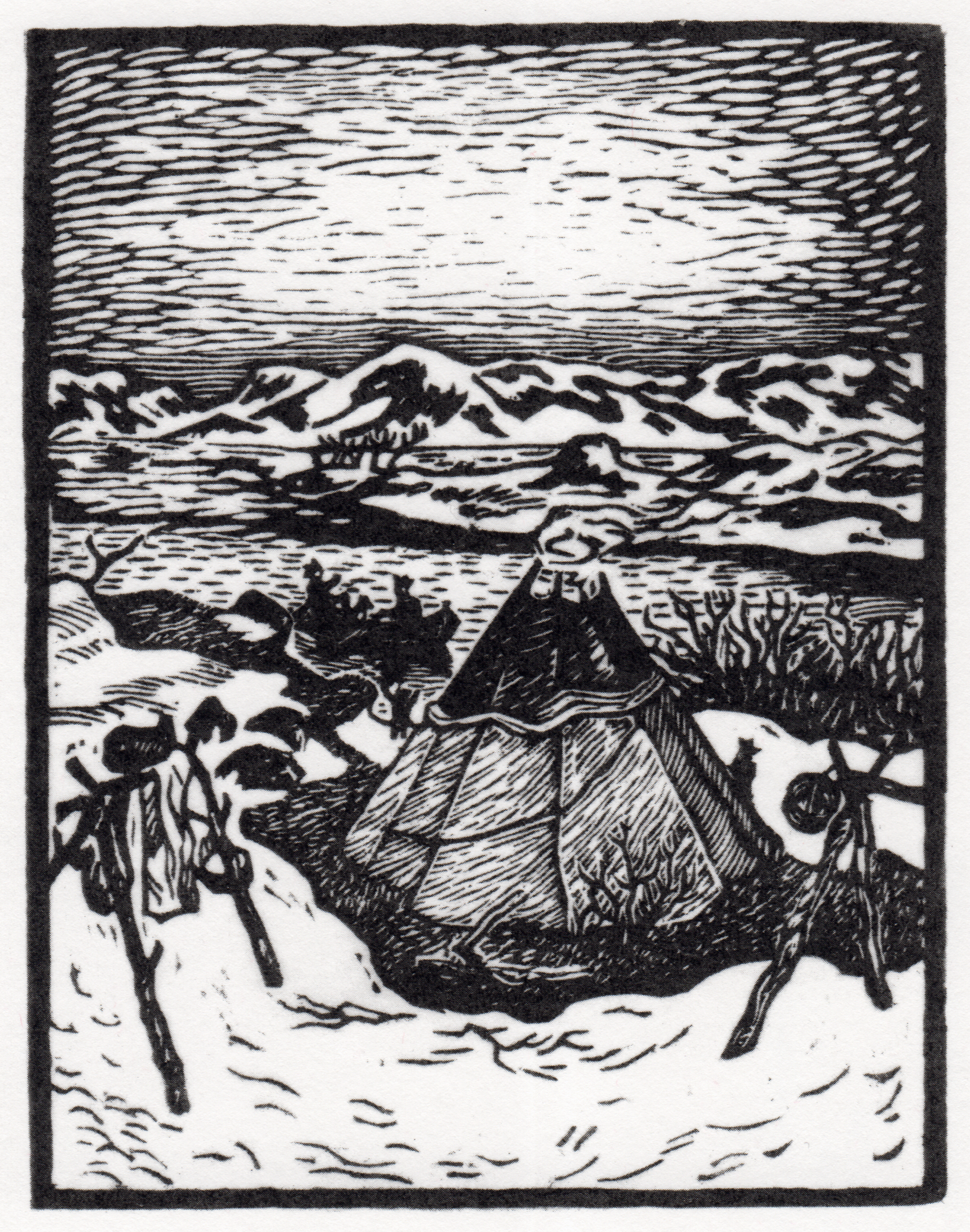
Spring

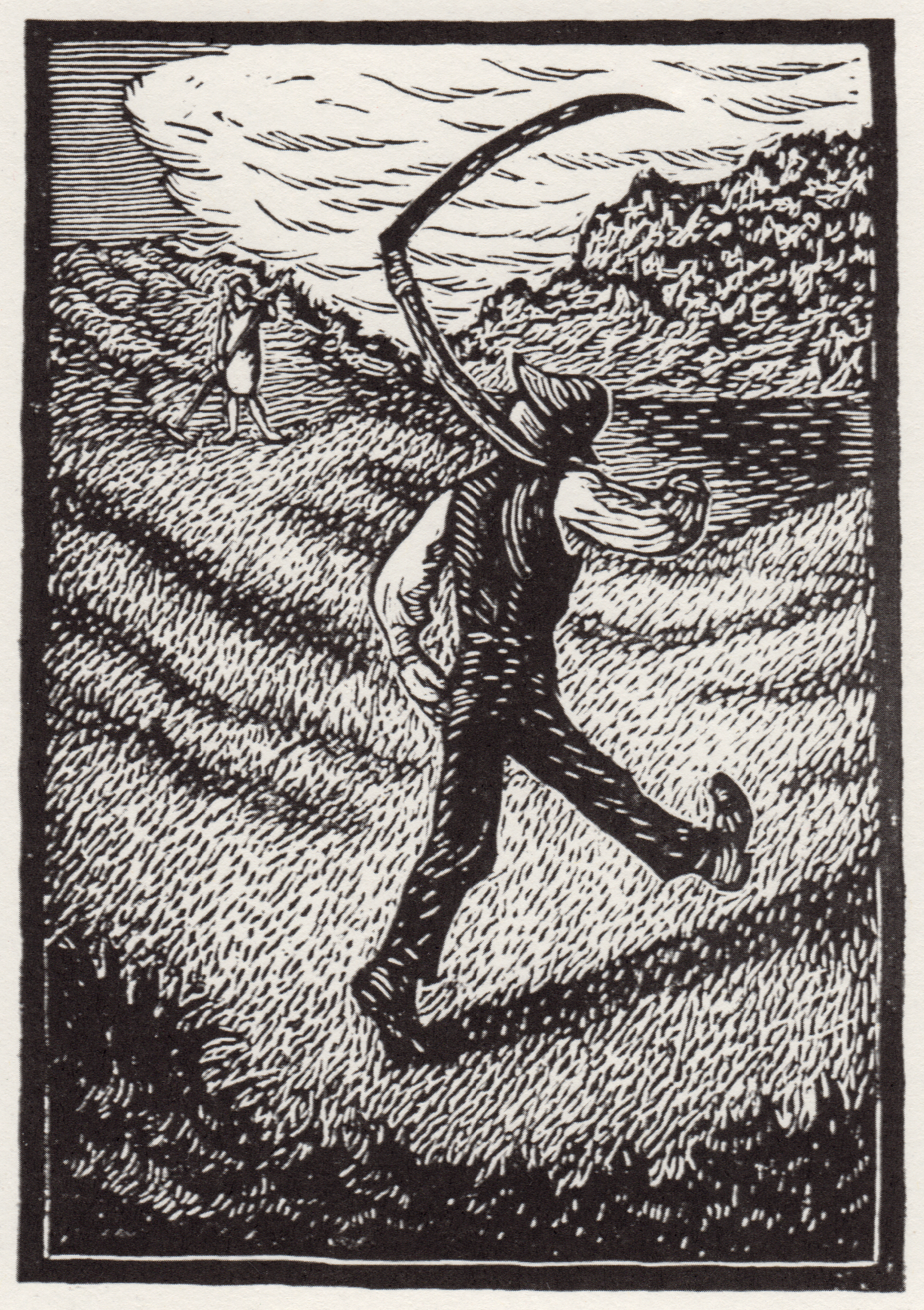
Man with Scythe
