= Helsinki Central Library Oodi =

Municipal library in Helsinki, Finland

- Helsingin keskustakirjasto Oodi; Helsingfors centrumbibliotek Ode
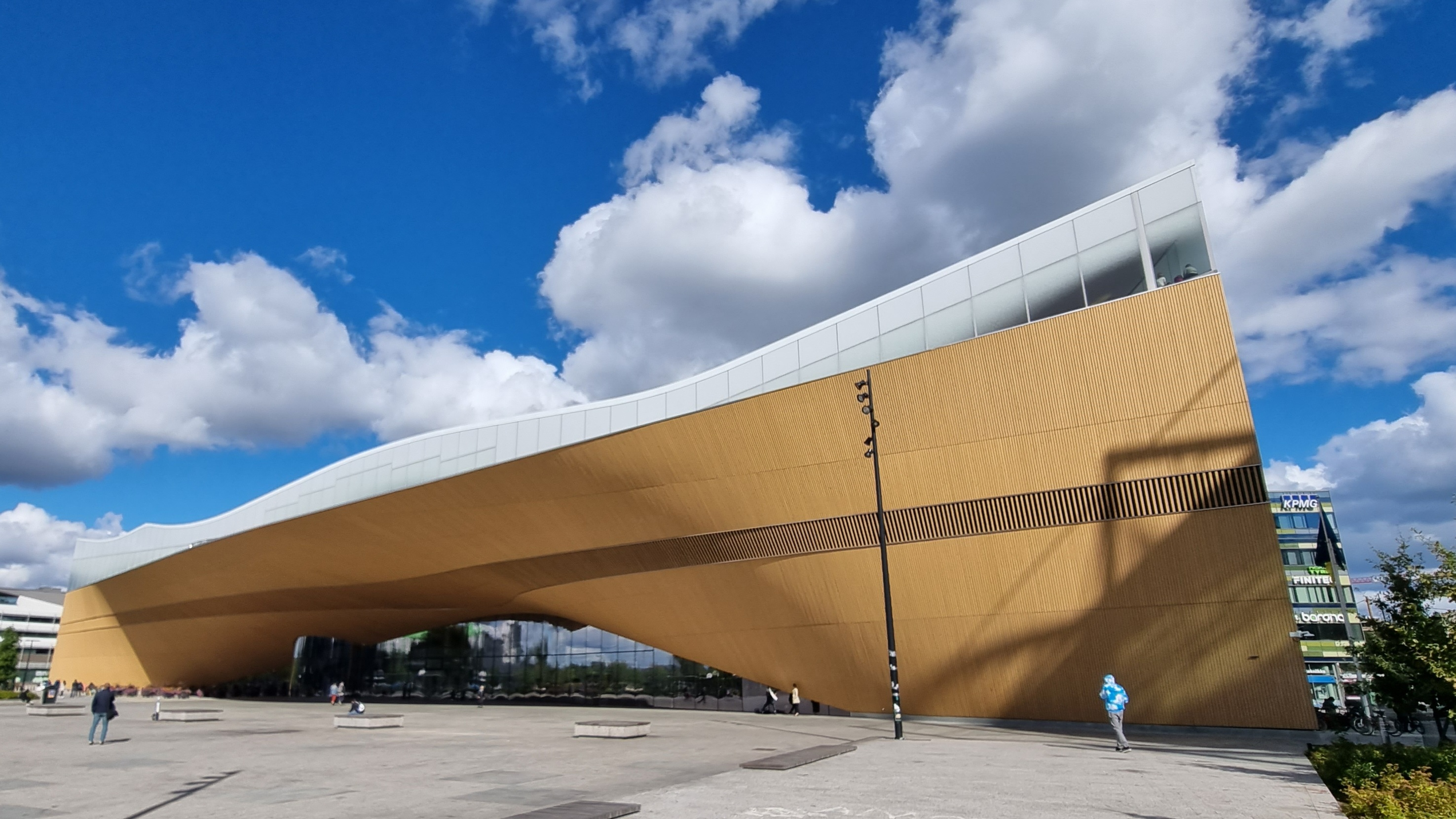
- Oodi in 2022
- 60.1738°N 24.9381°E
- Location: Kluuvi, Helsinki, Finland
- Type: Public library
- Established: 5 December 2018; 7 years ago
- Branch of: Helsinki City Library

Collection
- Size: 100,000 books

Other information
- Director: Anna-Maria Soininvaara
- Affiliation: HelMet
- Website: www.oodihelsinki.fi/en/

The Helsinki Central Library Oodi (Finnish: Helsingin keskustakirjasto Oodi; Swedish: Helsingfors centrumbibliotek Ode), commonly referred to as Oodi (lit. 'ode'), is a public library in Helsinki, Finland. The library is situated in the Kluuvi district, close to Helsinki Central Station and next to Helsinki Music Centre and Kiasma Museum of Contemporary Art. Despite its name, the library is not the main library in the Helsinki City Library system, which is located in Pasila instead; "central" refers to its location in the city centre.

Since opening in December 2018, Oodi has become one of Helsinki's most visited public buildings. It received more than 2.7 million visits in 2025, and recorded more than 575,000 loans, the highest figure among Helsinki's libraries. In 2025, Oodi was also the venue for around 1,200 free public events, including literary discussions, music performances, children's events, language cafés, lectures and film screenings. Oodi welcomed its ten-millionth visitor in March 2024, less than six years after opening.

In 2019, Helsinki Central Library Oodi was included in TIME magazine's “World’s Greatest Places” list. TIME highlighted Oodi as an innovative “library of the future”, drawing particular attention to its combination of traditional library functions with spaces for games, recording, film, concerts and other activities, as well as its distinctive architecture and reading spaces.

== History ==
A design competition in 2012 to build the library was won by the Finnish architectural firm ALA Architects and structural design by Ramboll Finland. ALA Architects won the commission over 543 other competitors. The library was planned as a three-story building with a large outdoor balcony and a ground-floor movie theatre. In January 2015, the Helsinki City Council voted 75–8 to launch the building project. The estimated costs of the new library was €98 million, of which the state agreed to pay €30 million in connection with the centenary of Finland's independence in 2017. The City of Helsinki budgeted €66 million for the building.

On 31 December 2016, it was announced that the new library would be named Oodi in Finnish and Ode in Swedish. The name was selected from a pool of some 1,600 names proposed by the public. According to Helsinki Deputy City Director Ritva Viljanen, "Oodi" was chosen because it's easy to remember, easy to say, and easy to translate. The selection jury also did not want to name the new library after a person.

The library was built in the Töölönlahti district next to Helsinki Music Centre and Kiasma Museum of Contemporary Art and inaugurated on 5 December 2018 on the eve of the Finnish Independence Day.

== Awards ==
Oodi has received major international and Finnish recognition for its architecture and innovative approach to library services. In 2019, the International Federation of Library Associations (IFLA) named Oodi as the best Public Library of the Year. The same year, Oodi was a finalist for the Finlandia Prize for Architecture, Finland's leading architecture award, although the prize was ultimately awarded to the renovation of Serpentine House. Oodi was also shortlisted for the 2019 European Union Prize for Contemporary Architecture – Mies van der Rohe Award, one of Europe's most prominent architecture awards.

== Services ==
Specially designed robots transport returned books to the automated shelving system on the third floor, known as the Book Heaven, which houses around 100,000 books, alongside magazines, newspapers, films, sheet music and games. The floor also provides reading areas, a children's section, a café and the Citizens' Balcony overlooking Töölönlahti.

The second floor is dedicated primarily to work, learning and creative activities. It includes group and meeting rooms, workspaces, three gaming rooms, music and recording studios, photography and video facilities, and the Urban Workshop, a makerspace equipped with 3D printers, laser cutters, sewing machines, large-format and UV printers, electronics workstations and other tools. Many of these facilities can be reserved free of charge through the city's Varaamo service. The ground floor contains the main library services as well as spaces for public events, including the Maijansali multipurpose hall and Kino Regina cinema. It also houses Europa Experience Helsinki (EU@Oodi), an interactive exhibition operated jointly by the European Parliament and European Commission that provides information about the European Union through multimedia displays, interactive installations and educational activities. Kino Regina, operated by The National Audiovisual Institute (KAVI), screens Finnish and international films, including classics, contemporary cinema and art films. Oodi also provides spaces for meetings, exhibitions, performances and workshops, as well as services for young people, families and visitors.

== Energy use and environmental impact ==
The building is regarded as very energy-efficient due to its use of local materials and its use of sunlight. The building uses passive solar building design and uses almost no energy.

== Gallery ==
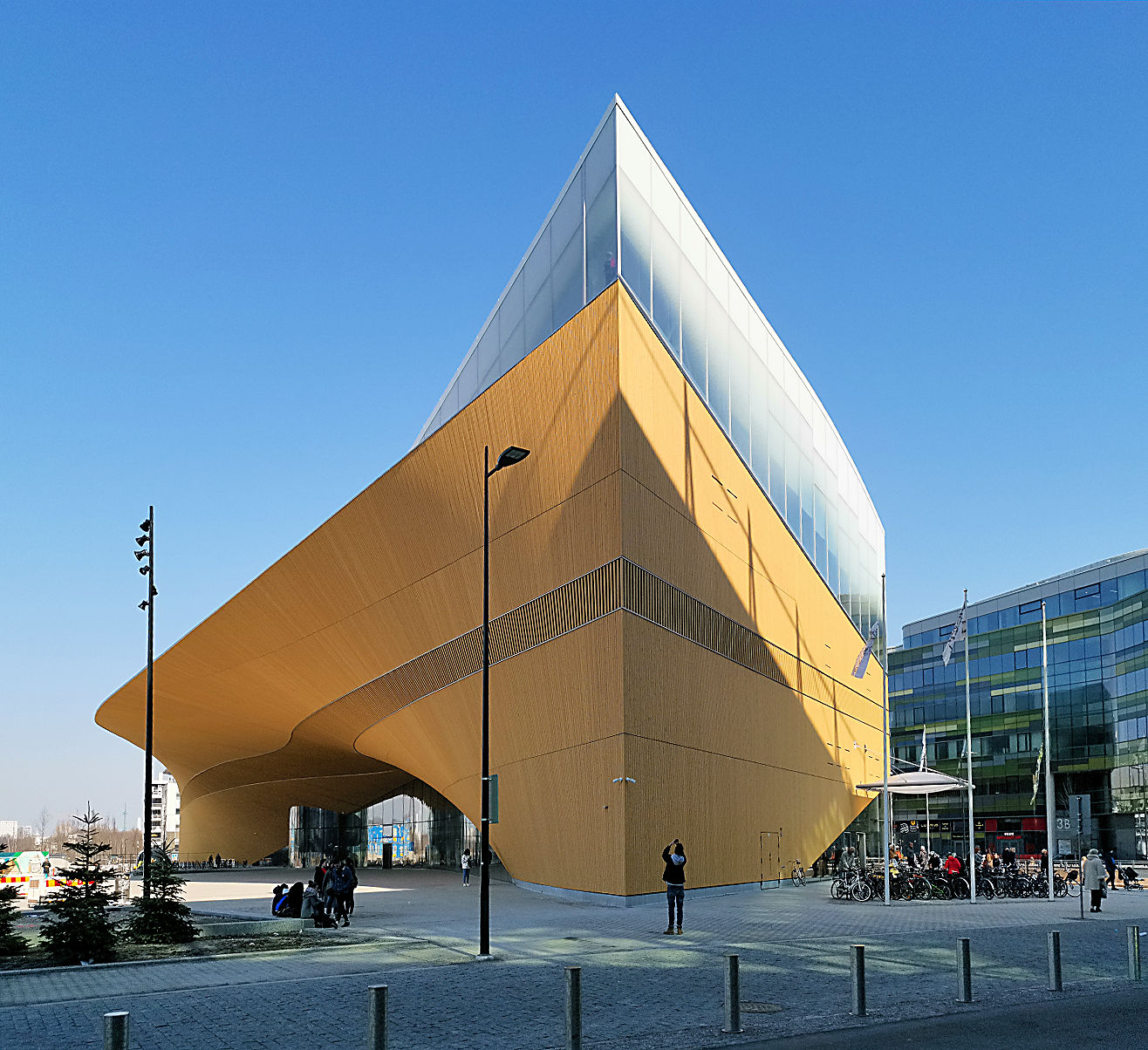
Corner of the building

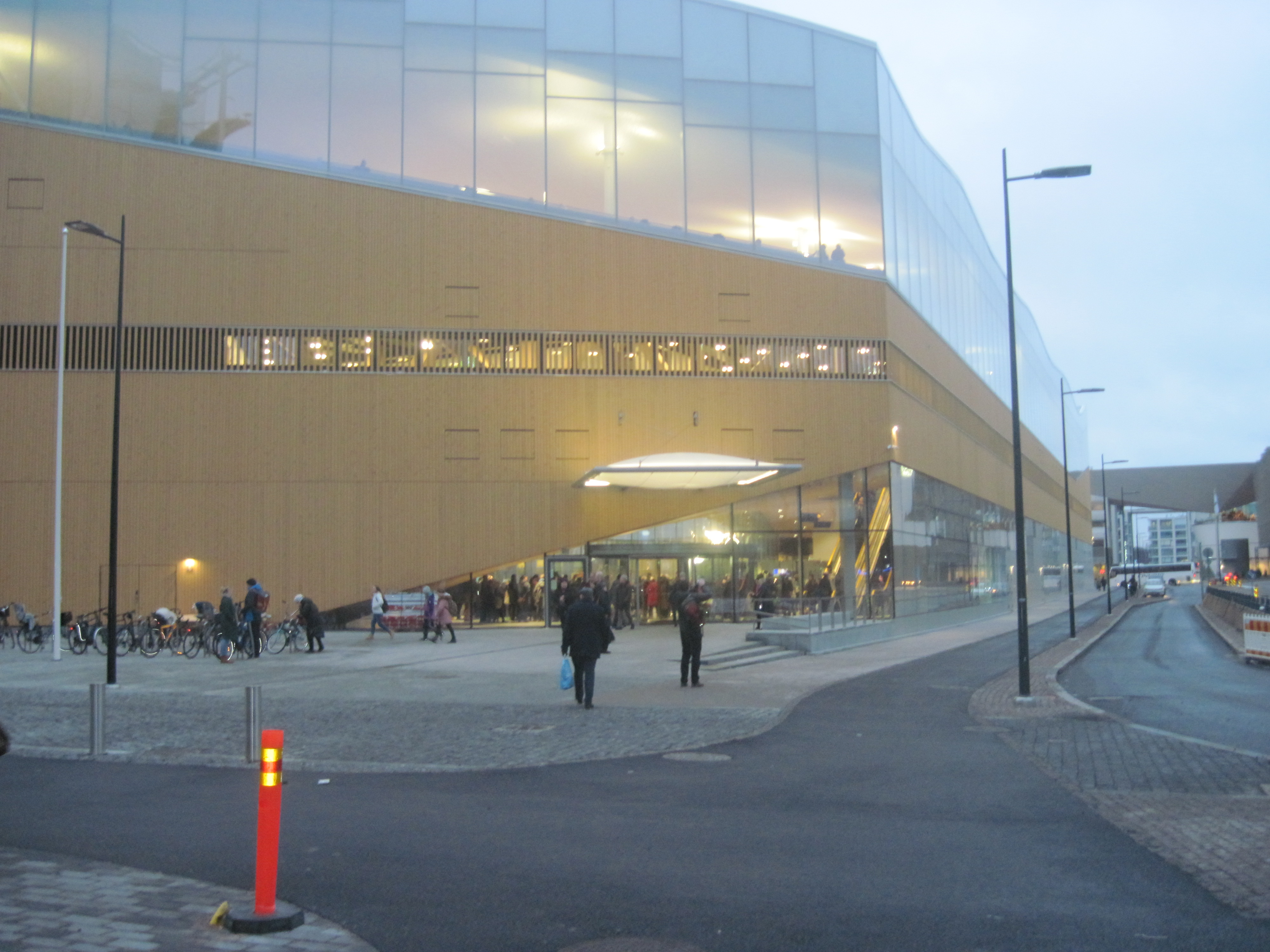
From the east, days after opening in 2018

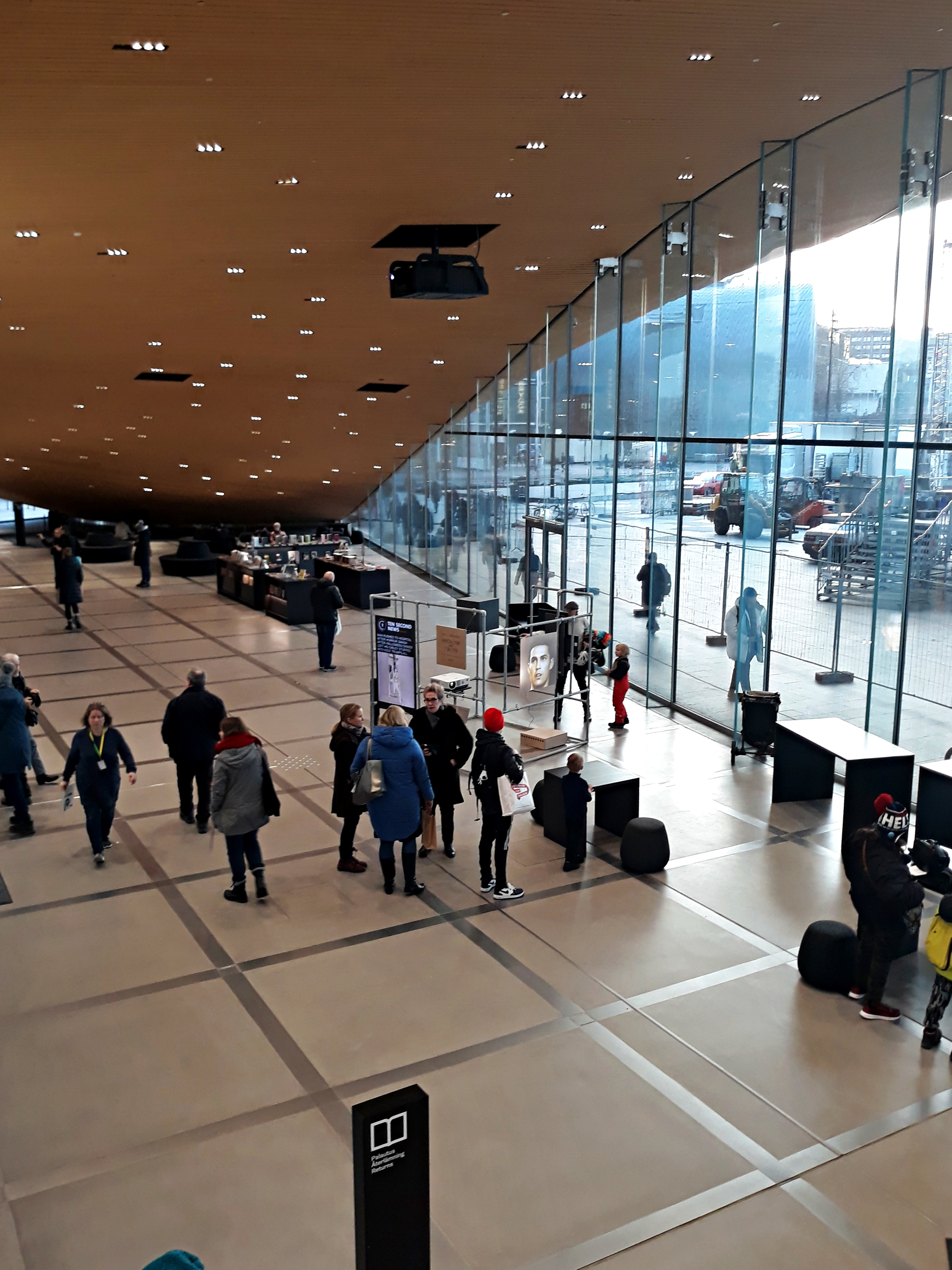
Entrance, ground floor

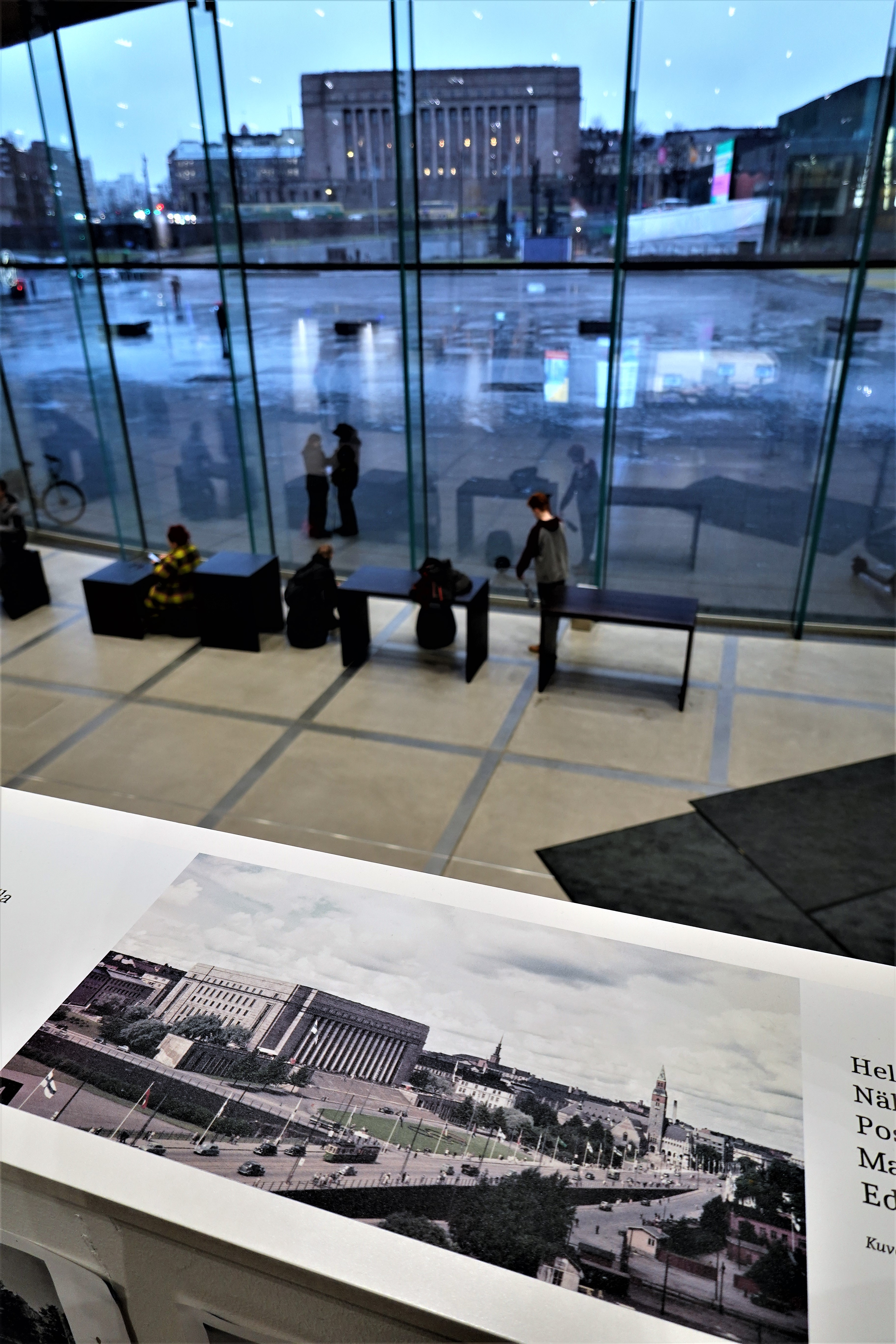
View to the Parliament House

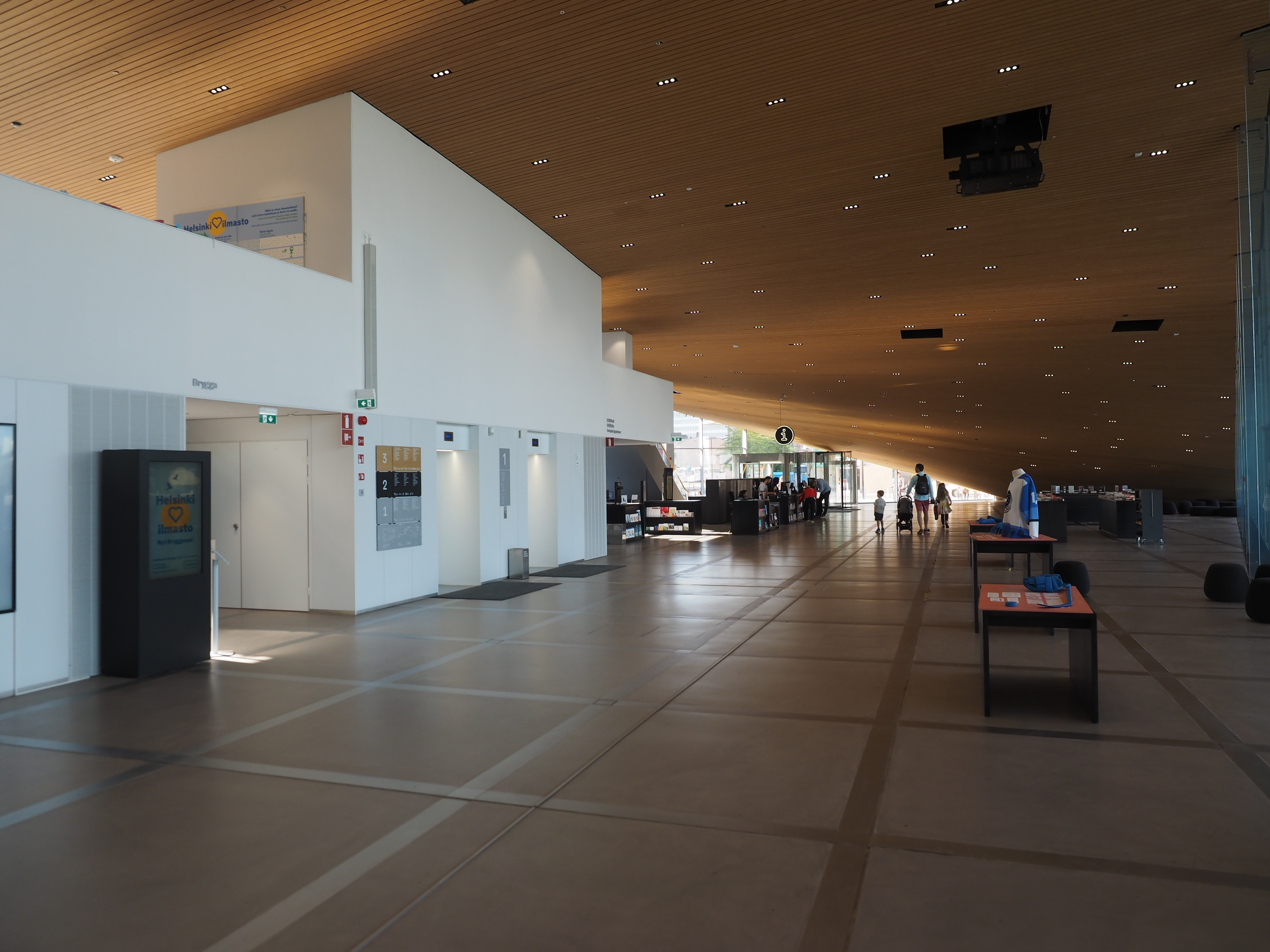
Ground floor

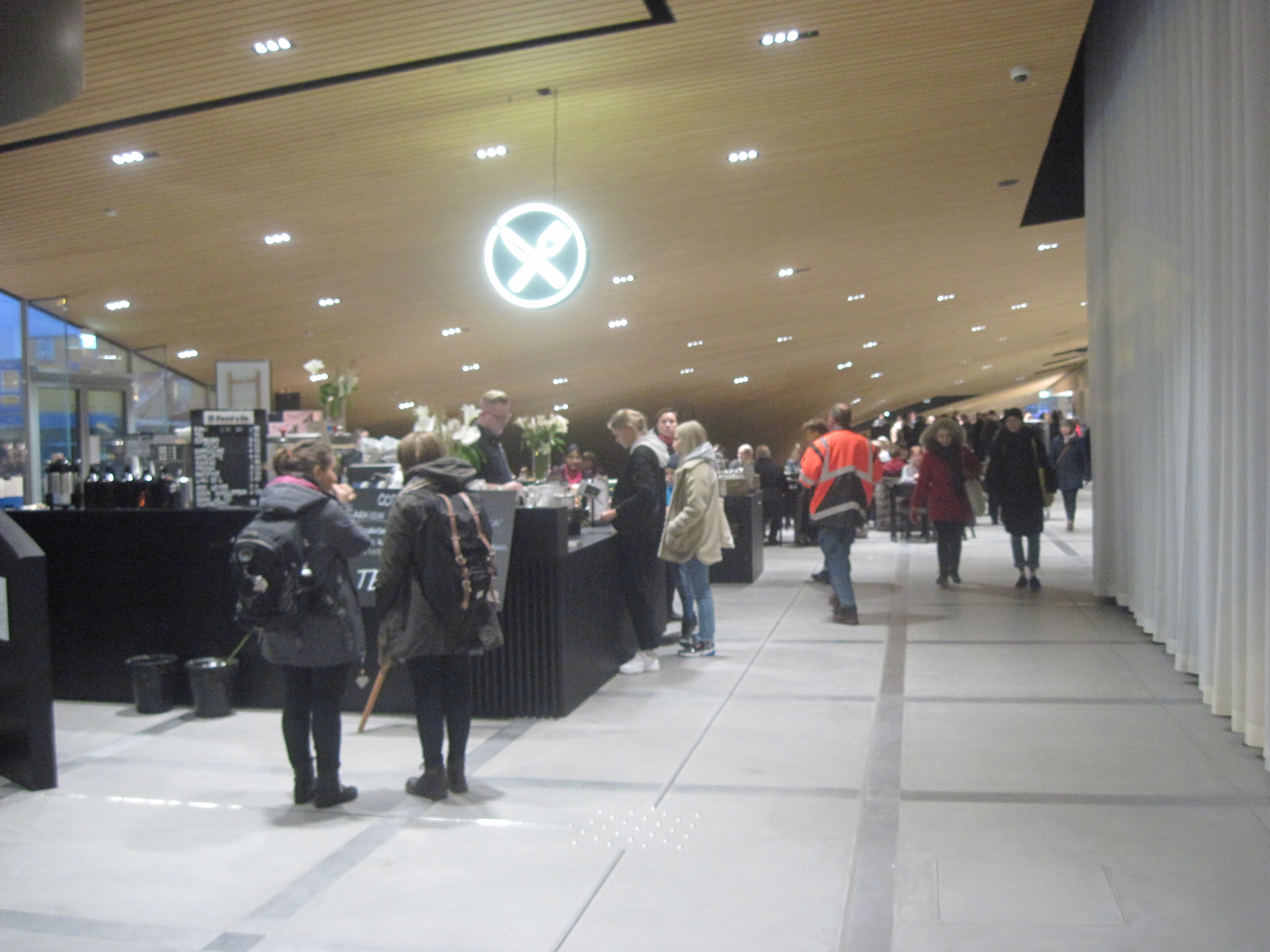
Cafeteria

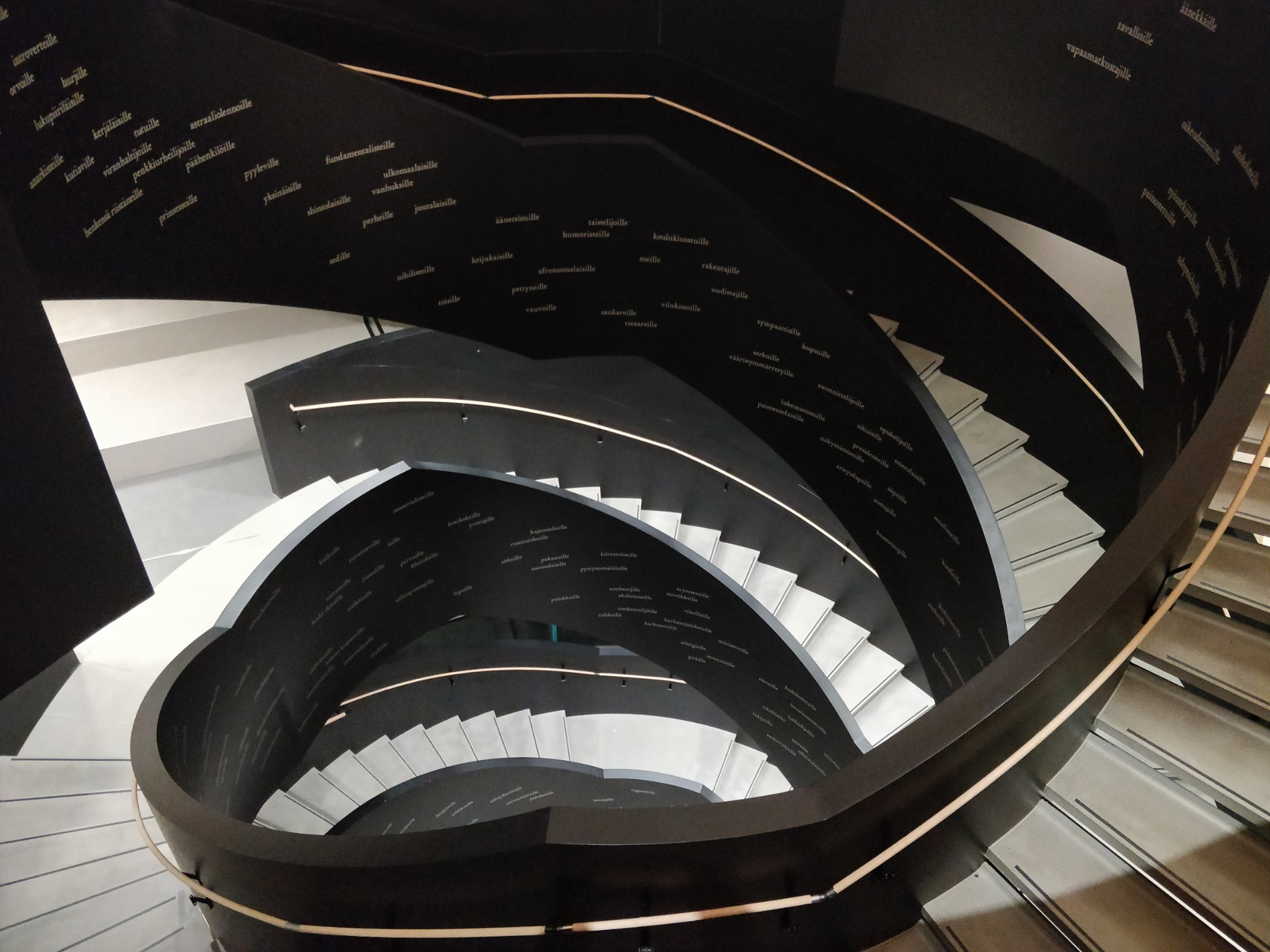
Double-helix staircase

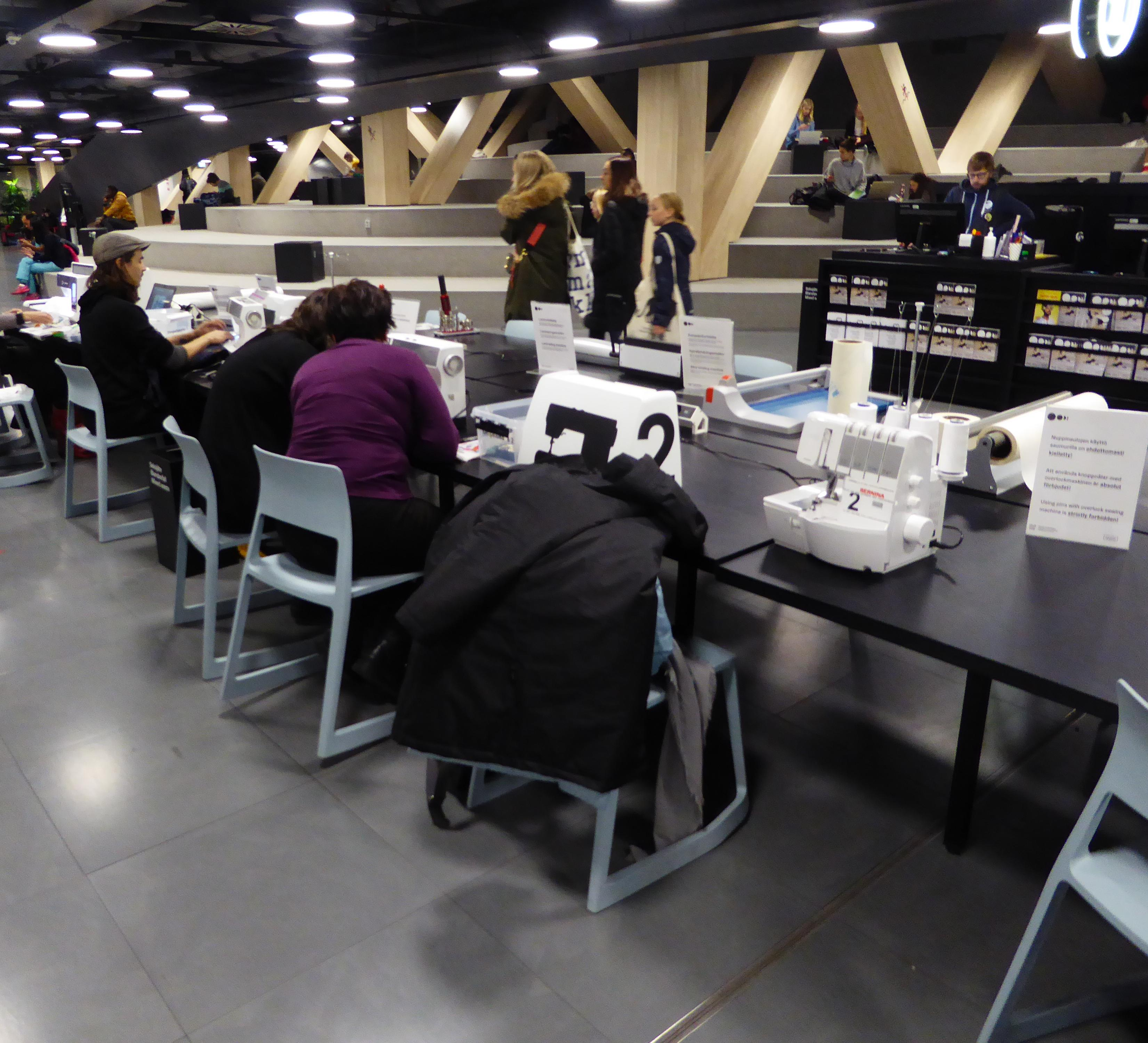
Second floor, urban workshop and meeting spaces

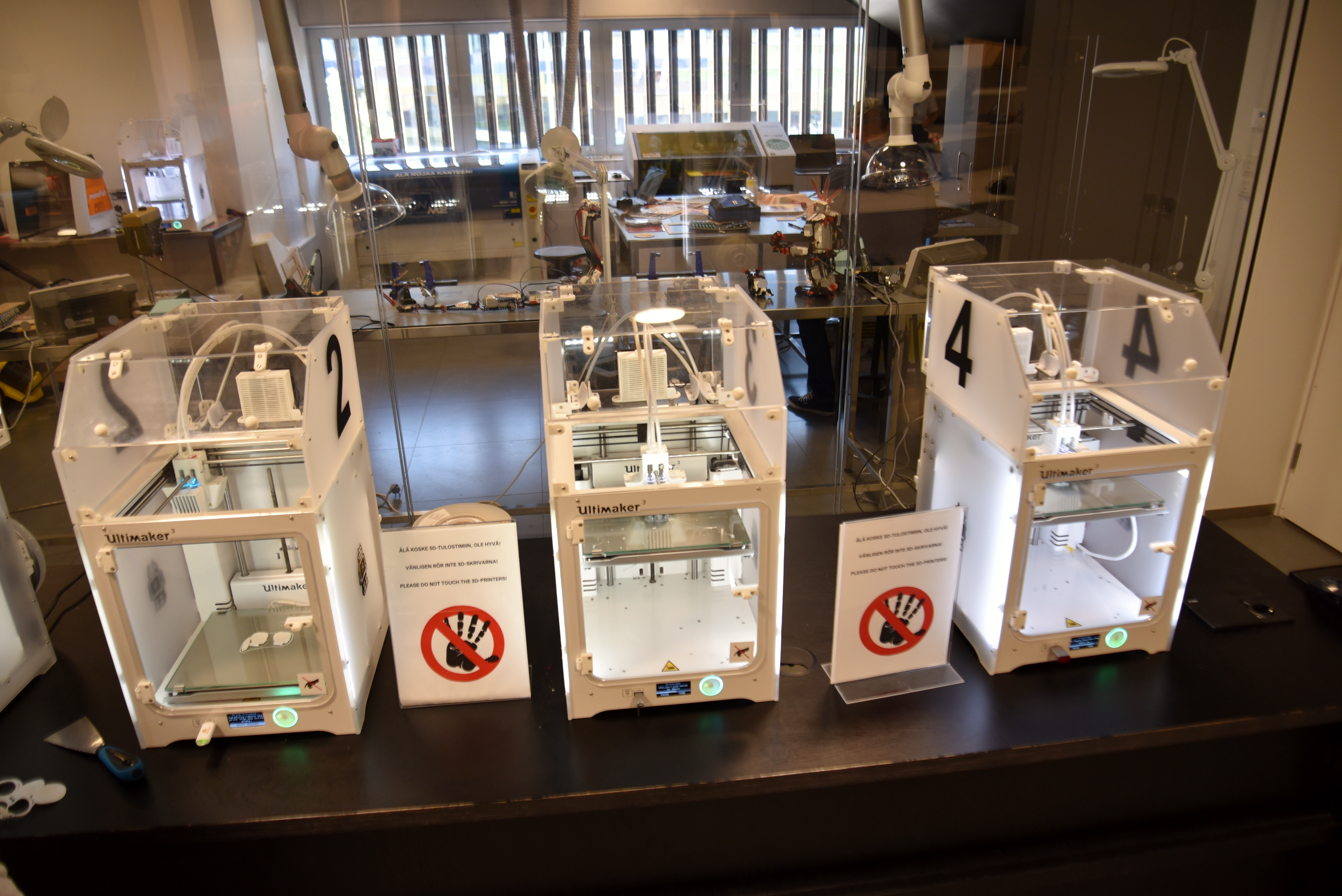
Ultimaker 3D printers of the second floor

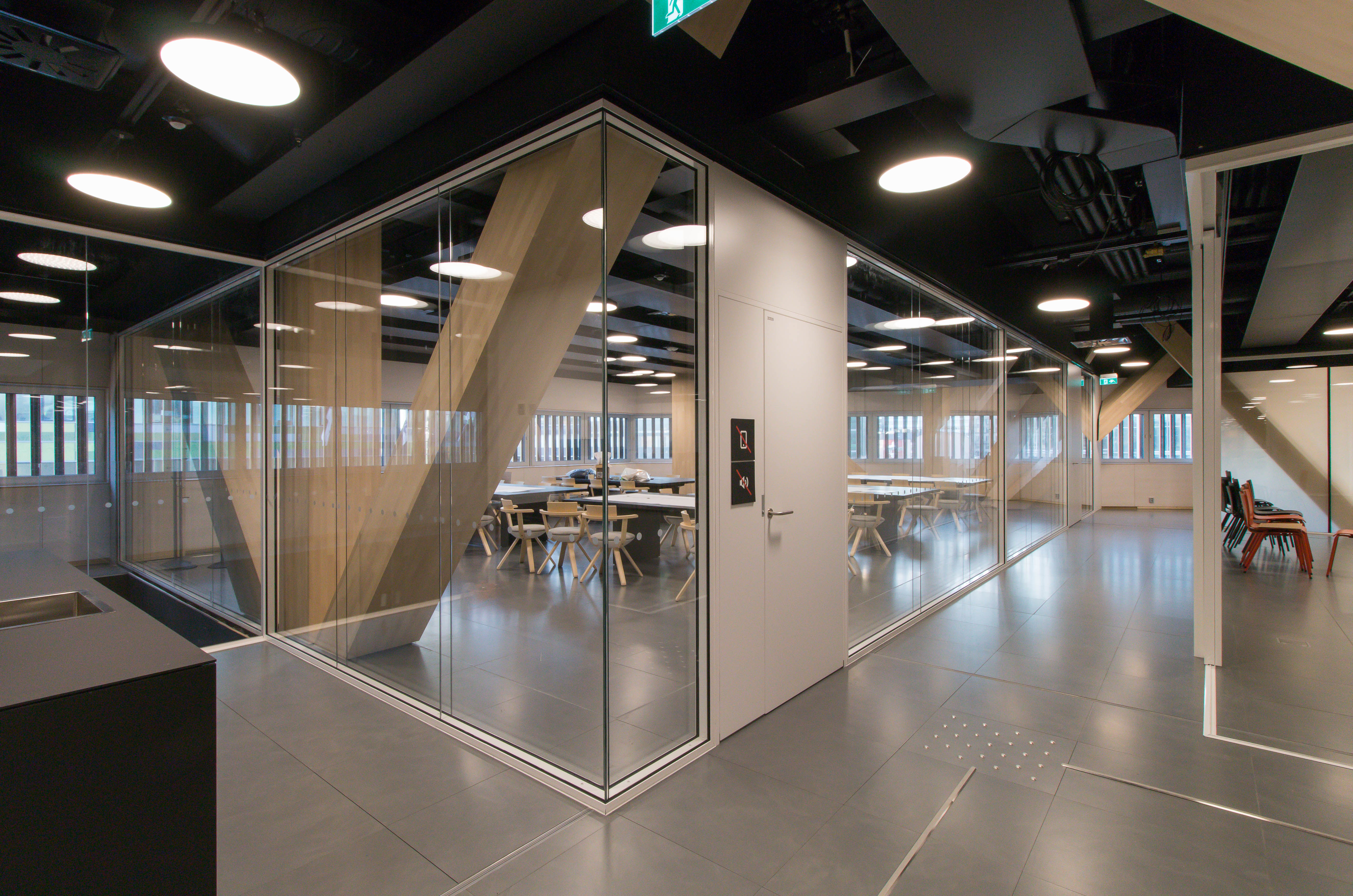
Smart glass rooms

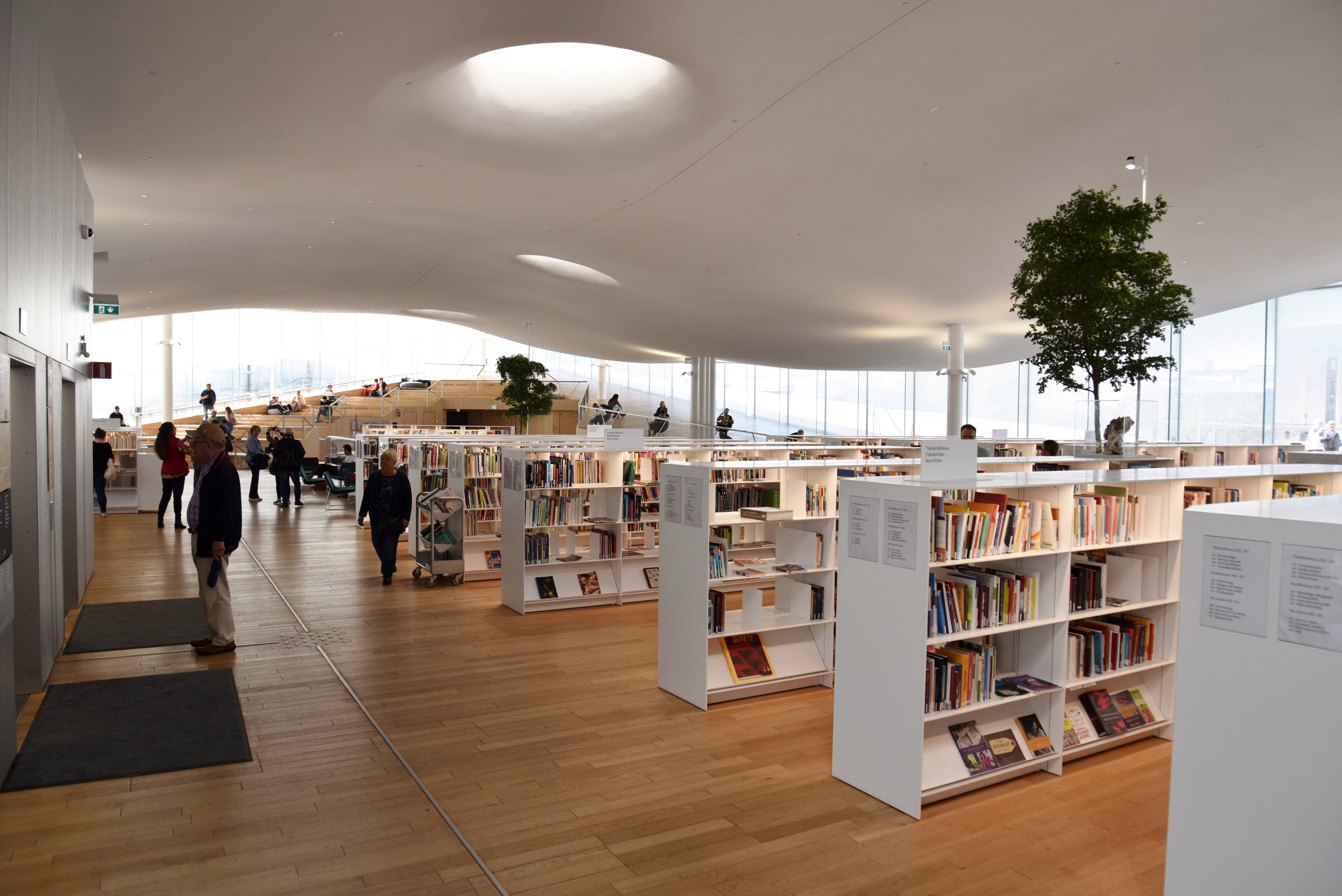
Third floor, west wing

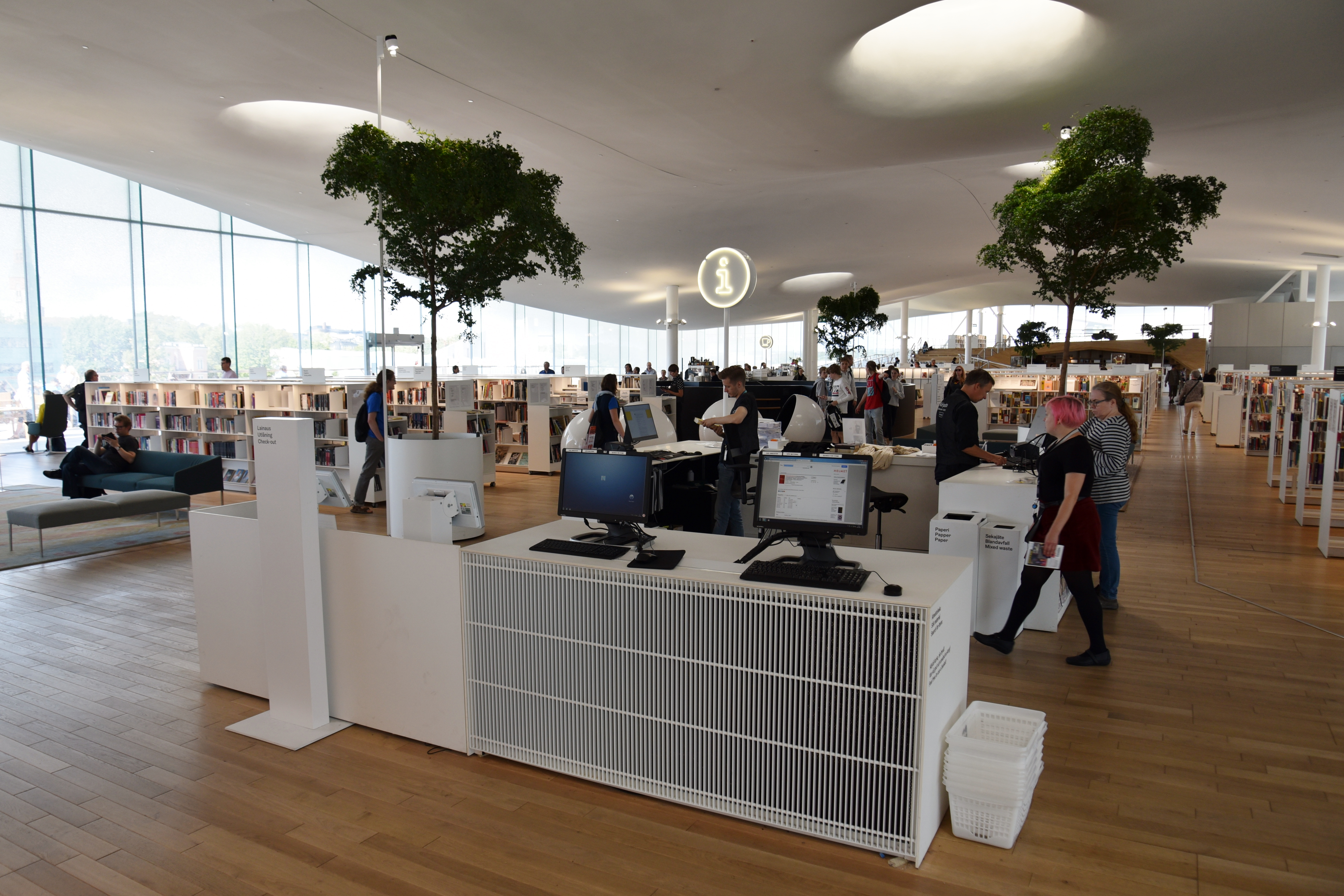
Third floor, east wing

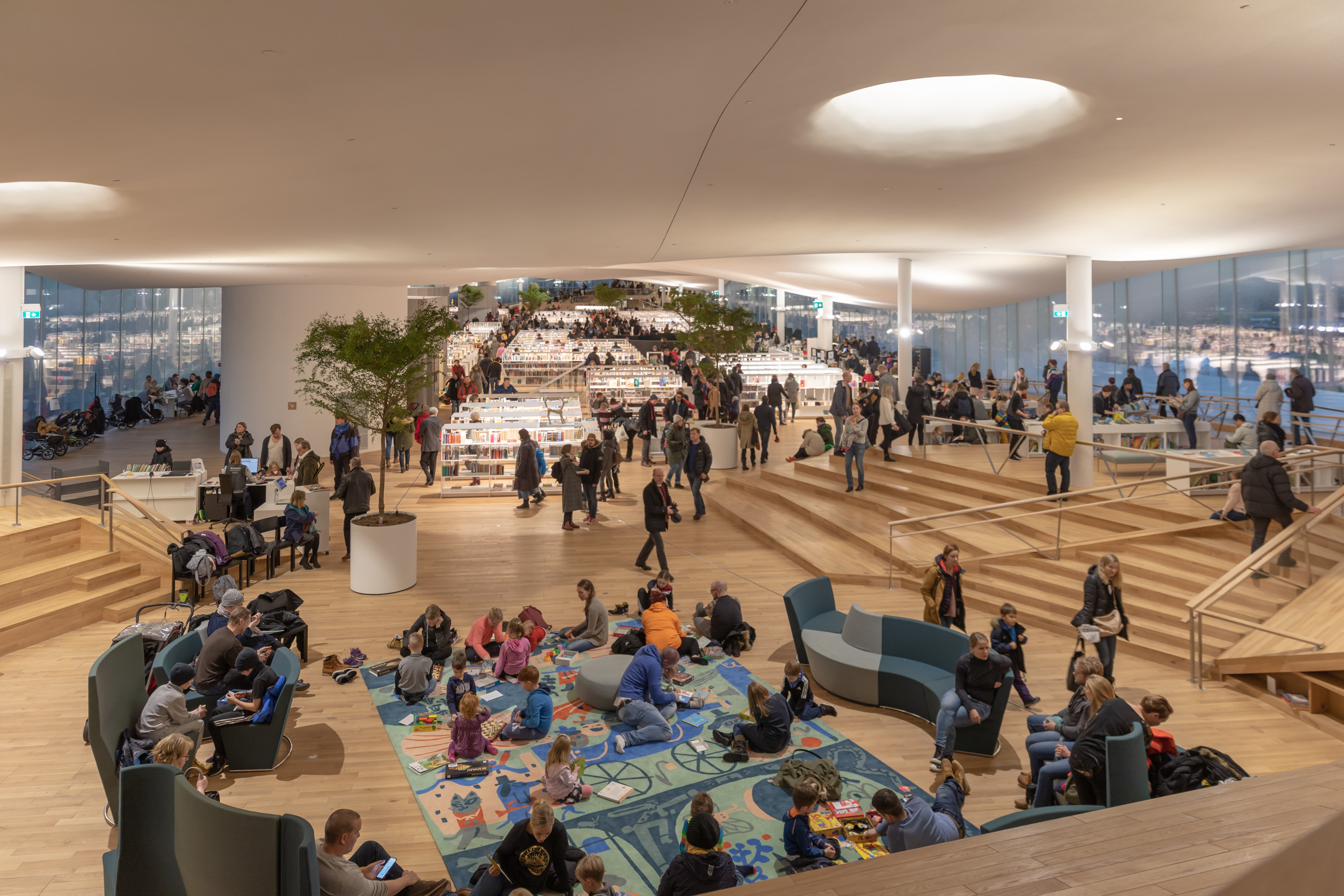
The third floor of Oodi

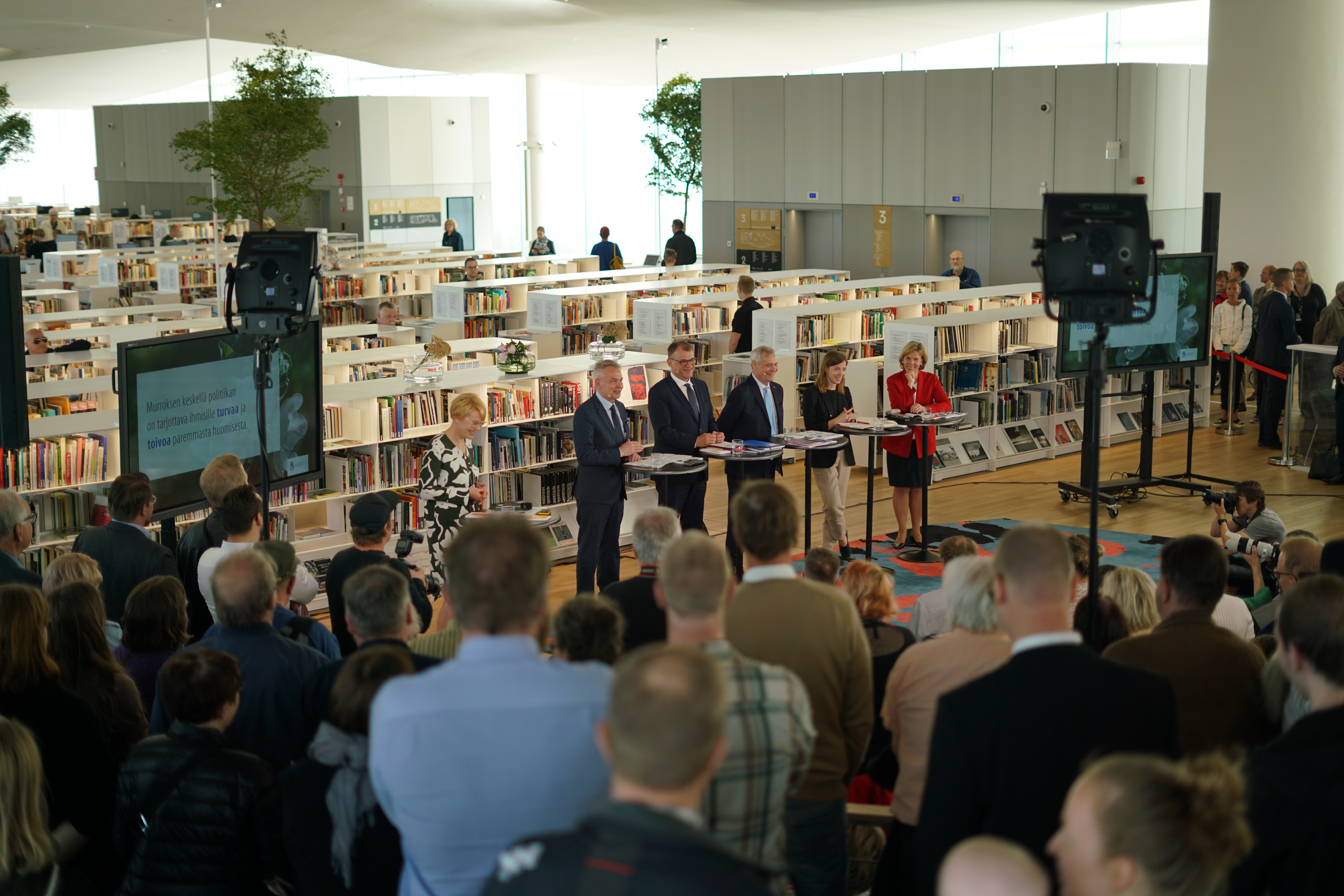
Rinne Cabinet announcing their Government Programme at Oodi, June 2019

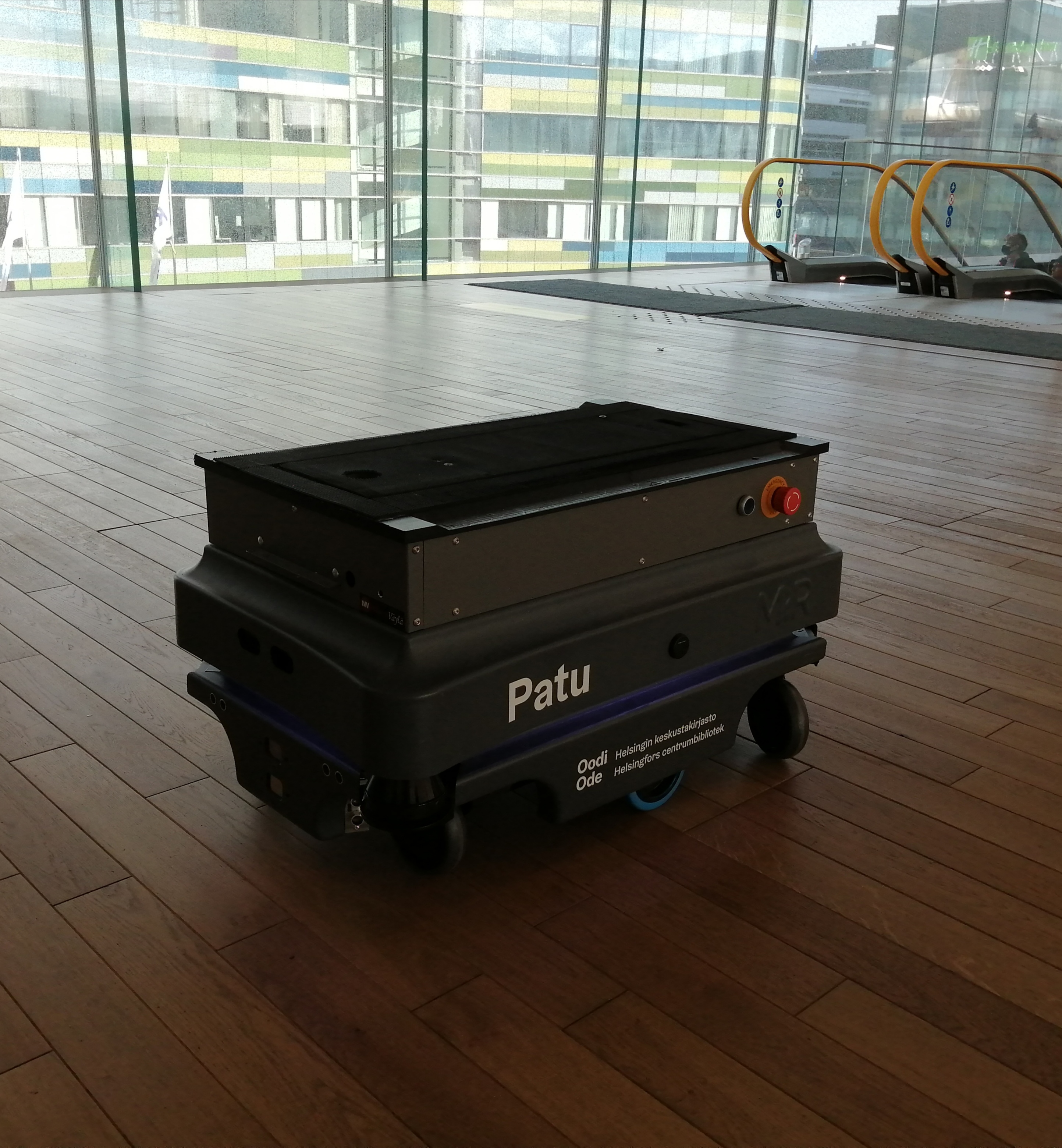
Library robot without books

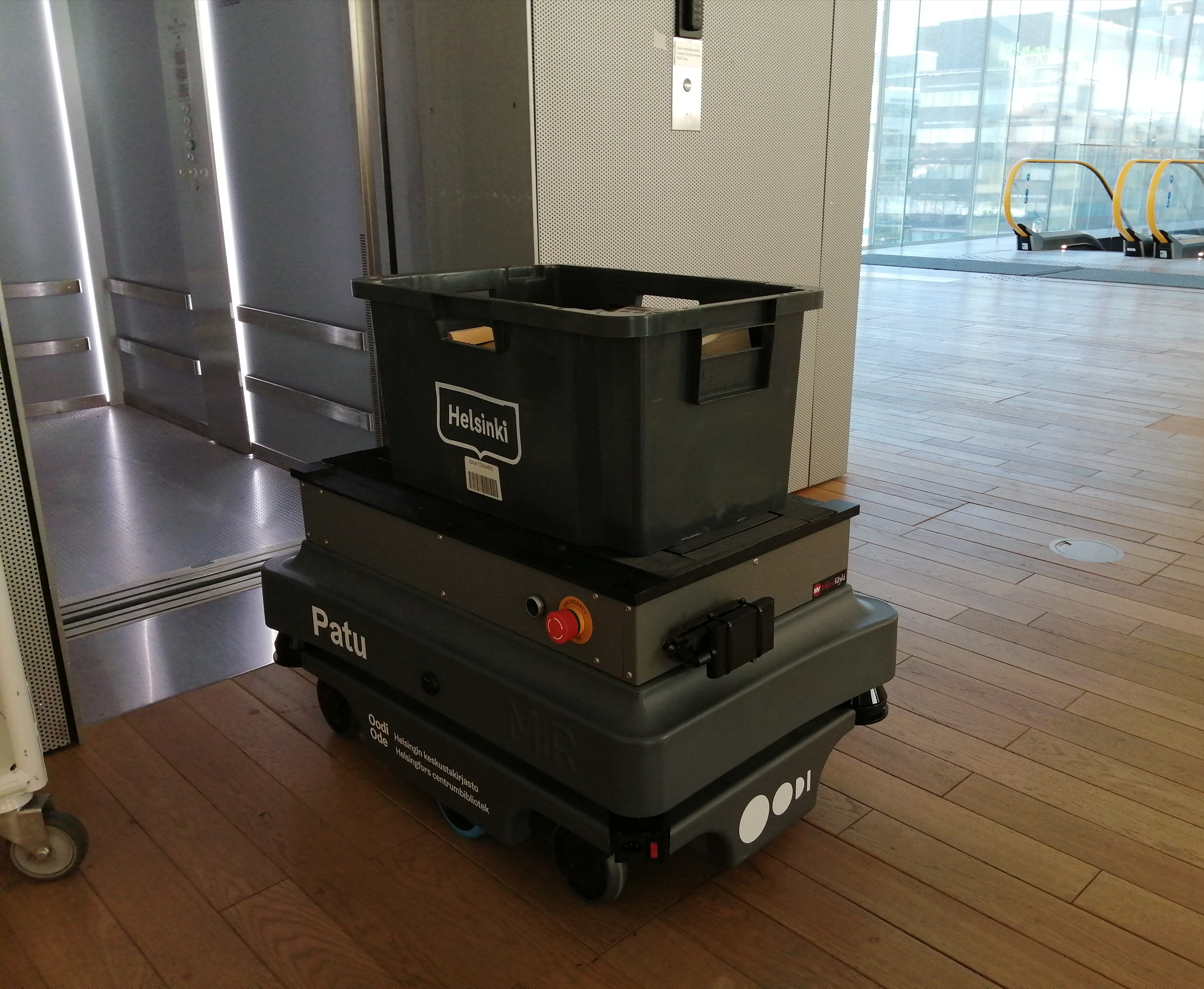
Library robot with books

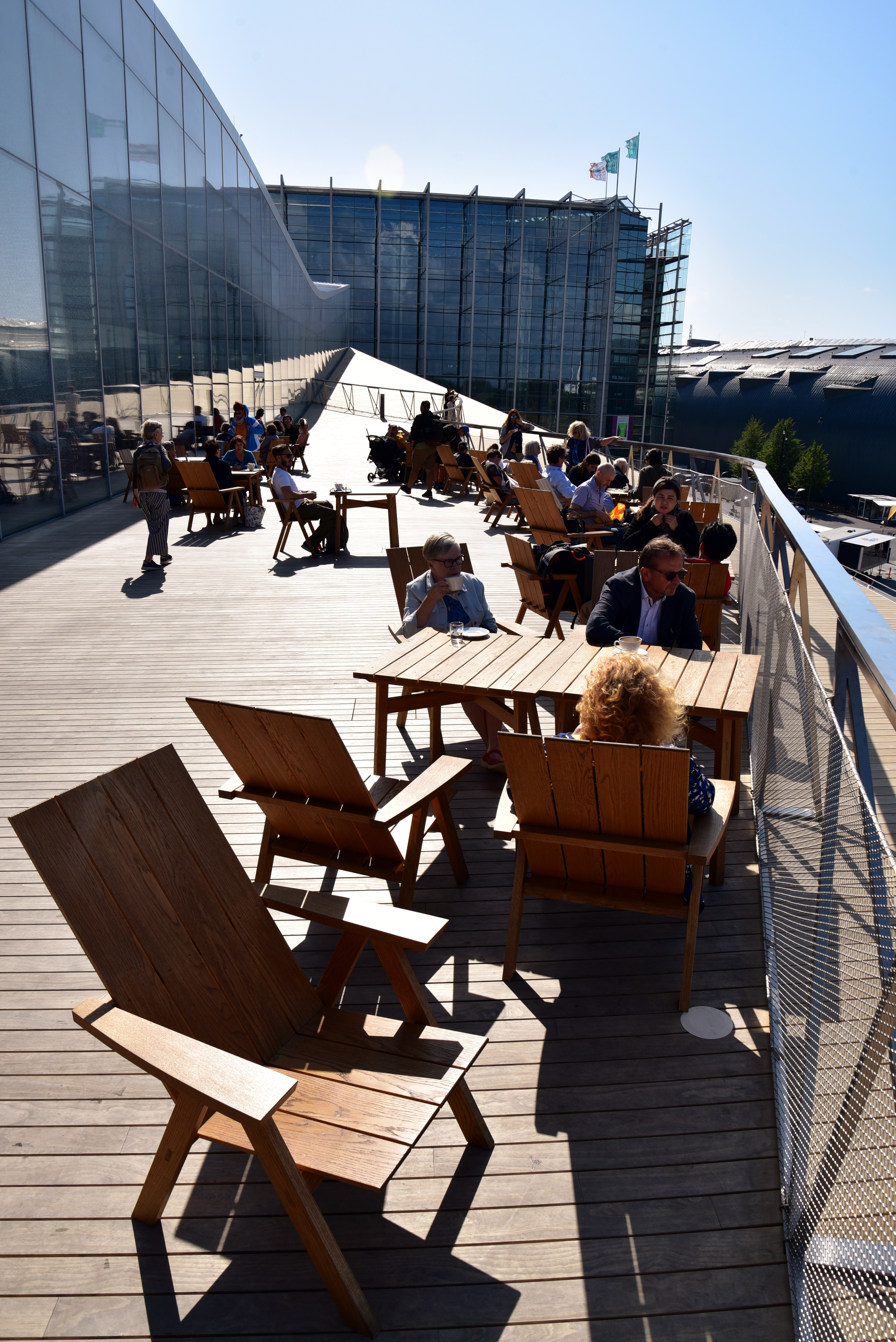
Terrace

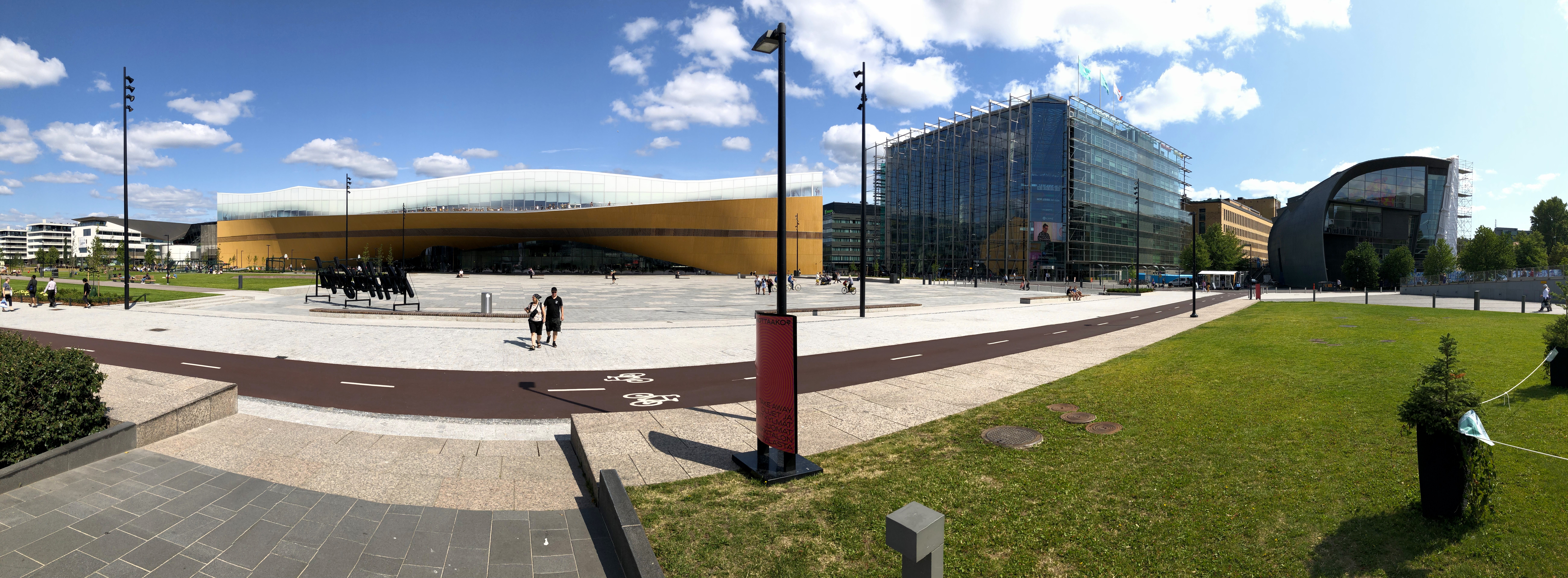
Kansalaistori Square in front of the library, with Sanoma House and Kiasma on the right

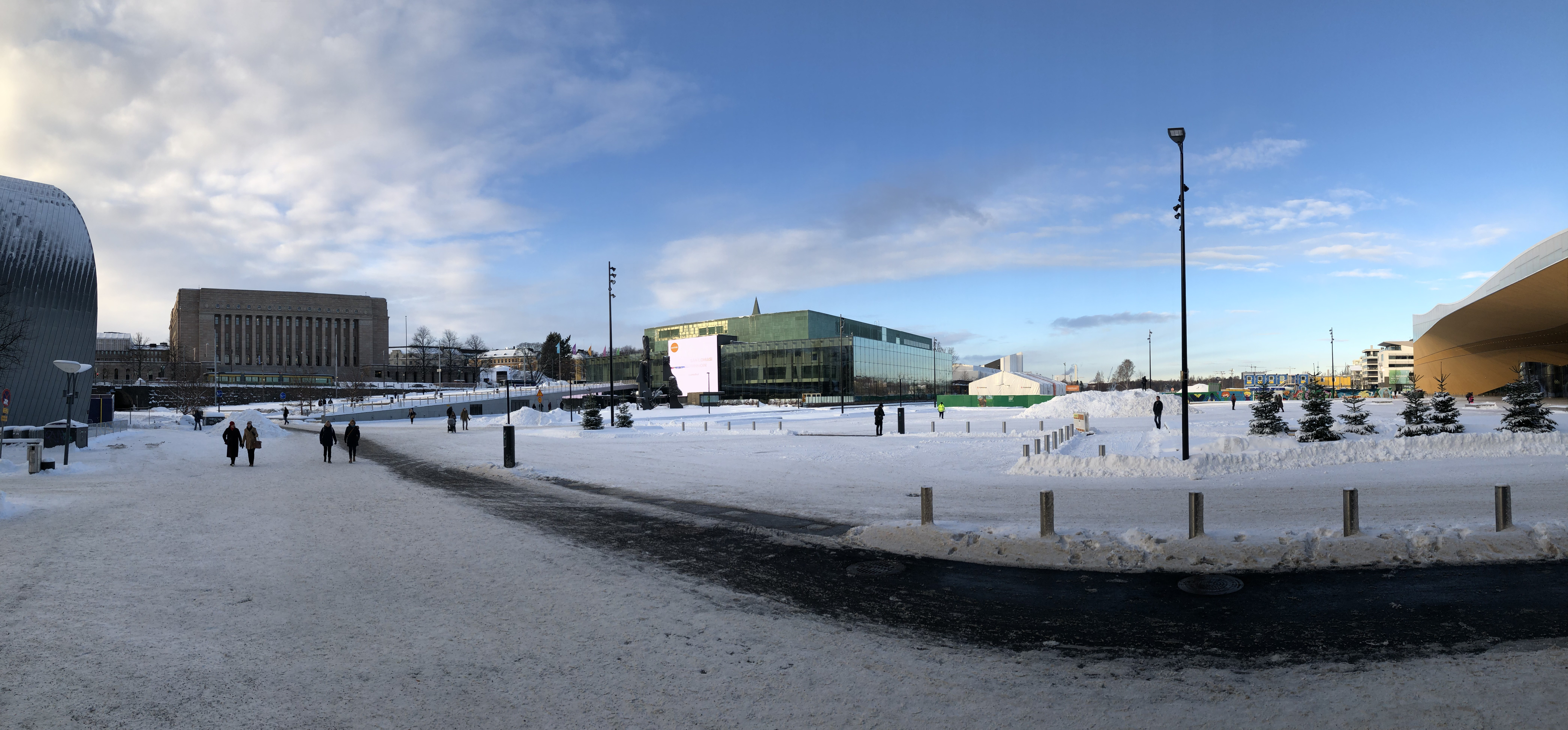
The square in winter, with Parliament House and Helsinki Music Centre on the left

== See also ==
- Helsinki Metropolitan Area Libraries
- Helsinki University Library
- National Library of Finland
- Rikhardinkatu Library
- Kallio Library
- Tampere Central Library Metso
- Turku Main Library
- Seinäjoki Library
- List of libraries in Finland
