= List of archives in Finland =

This is a list of archives in Finland.

== Archives in Finland ==
- Aalto University Archives
- Åbo Akademi University Library : The Archive Collections
- Ålands landskapsarkiv (Archive of Åland)
- Brages Urklippsverk, Helsinki
- Finnish National Gallery Archives, Helsinki
- Hämeenlinnan maakunta-arkisto, Hämeenlinna
- Helsinki City Archives
- Joensuun maakunta-arkisto
- Jyväskylän maakunta-arkisto
- Literary Archives of the Finnish Literature Society (SKS)
- Mikkelin maakunta-arkisto
- National Archives of Finland
- National Audiovisual Institute
- National Library of Finland - Manuscript Collection
- Oulun maakunta-arkisto
- Saamelaisarkisto, Inari
- Sota-arkisto (Military Archives of Finland)
- Tampere City Archives
- Turku City Archives
- Turun maakunta-arkisto
- University of Helsinki Archive and Registration Services
- University of Jyväskylä - Registry Office and Archive
- University of Oulu - Registry Office and Central Archive
- University of Turku - Records Management and Central Archives
- Vaasan maakunta-arkisto (Archives of Vaasa)

== See also ==
- List of archives
- List of libraries in Finland
- List of museums in Finland
- Culture of Finland
