= Tritonia Academic Library =

Coordinates: 63.105°N 21.5919°E

- Tritonia, Vaasan tiedekirjasto Vasa vetenskapliga bibliotek Tritonia
- Established: 2001
- Location: Vaasa and Jakobstad, Finland
- Affiliations: University of Vaasa; Vaasa University of Applied Sciences; Novia University of Applied Sciences
- Website: http://www.tritonia.fi/

The Academic Library of Tritonia is a library that serves the educational and research needs of three different universities in Vaasa, Finland. These universities include University of Vaasa, Vaasa University of Applied Sciences, and Novia University of Applied Sciences. The library has units in Vaasa and Jakobstad.

== History and function ==
Tritonia started as a collaboration between University of Vaasa, the Vaasa branch of Åbo Akademi University, and Hanken Vaasa. The goal was to pool their educational resources in a joint library that could offer the same material, both digital and printed, to all the students and researchers of the respective universities.

The first Tritonia building, which is located in the heart of the campus of University of Vaasa, was completed in 2001. In 2010, Vaasa University of Applied Sciences and Novia University of Applied Sciences joined the collaboration and merged their libraries with Tritonia's. Starting 2021, the Tritonia collaboration includes University of Vaasa, Vaasa University of Applied Sciences, and Novia University of Applied Sciences. In the summer 2022, Tritonia moved to its current location on campus, the renovated Luotsi building.

The collections in Tritonia reflect the curricula of the respective universities. The library provides versatile printed and electronic materials. Printed collections are available for everyone, but e-resources are available mainly for students and staff of our universities and universities of applied sciences within the university network and through remote use. The library also has a collection of textbooks for the current courses held at the universities. The library also has a few special collections that are accessible only through special permission due to the collections' historical and rare nature.

Tritonia provides courses on information retrieval for the students and researchers of the universities. Education in Information Literacy

The universities use both Finnish and Swedish, which means that Tritonia's customer service is bilingual. Because a high number of non-native students study in the respective universities, English is also a commonly used language.

== See also ==
- List of libraries in Finland
