= Jyväskylä University Library =

Academic library in Finland

Coordinates: 62.2378°N 25.7363°E

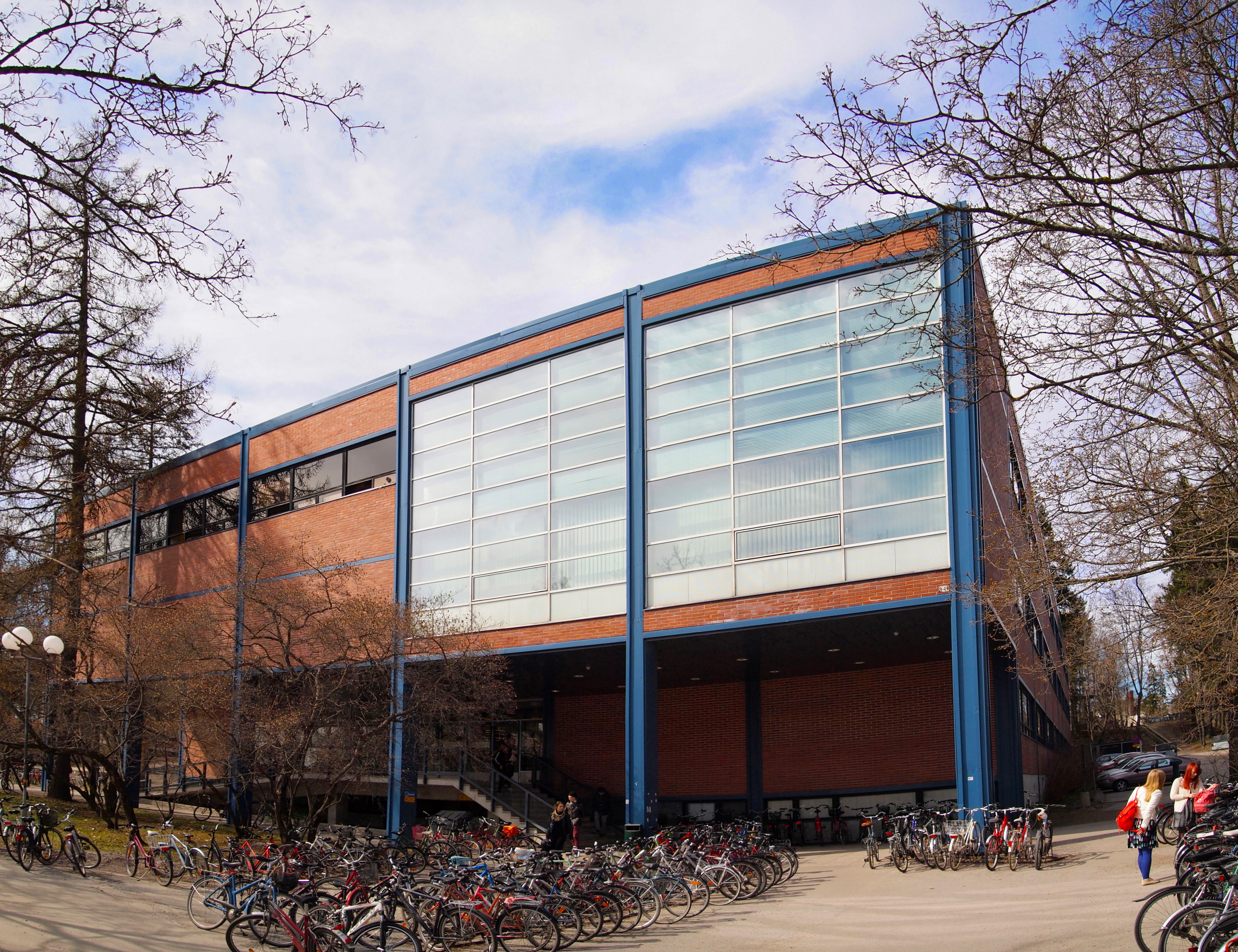
Jyväskylä University Main Library is designed by Arto Sipinen.

Jyväskylä University Library is a multidisciplinary university library in Finland. It is an independent institute of the University of Jyväskylä and one of the oldest libraries in Finland.

== Key information ==
The University of Jyväskylä Library is the largest scientific library in Central Finland, with roots dating back to the 1860s. Open to all, its primary mission is to support the University’s research and teaching, promote open science, and provide high-quality library and information services to its users. Together with the Jyväskylä University Museum, the library forms the Open Science Centre (OSC). In addition, the library is one of six Legal Deposit Libraries in Finland for ensuring long-term access to the national published heritage.

Over a half million customers visit the library annually.

== Collections ==
The library's collections contain over 1.5 million works and thousands of printed and electronic journals. Customers have access to Finnish and foreign databases, e-book collections, and other online resources in various scientific fields. The electronic materials are mainly available only on the university's network.

The Jyväskylä University Library is one of six Legal Deposit Libraries in Finland. The legal deposit status is based on the Act on Collecting and Preserving Cultural Materials (formerly the Free-Copy Act), and the library was granted this right in 1919. The collection is called Fennica and it includes Finnish printed materials and, since autumn 2009, also sound and image recordings, Finnish online materials, and radio and TV programmes broadcast in Finland. The library also held legal deposit rights for Finnish audiovisual materials from 1981 to 2007. The oldest item in the legal deposit collection is the Missale Aboense, a parchment edition from 1488.

== Building ==
The University Library is located on the Seminaarinmäki campus in a building designed by Arto Sipinen, where it moved in 1974.

The library was closed for renovations from 2019 to 2021. The renovations were designed by architect Ari Sipinen, Arto Sipinen's son. The building reopened in autumn 2021 under the name Lähde. The renovation was awarded the Finlandia Prize for Architecture in 2022.

== History ==
The library originated in 1863, when Uno Cygnaeus, the director of the first teacher training seminary in Finland, acquired equipment and teaching materials with an initial capital of 5,000 rubles. Due to limited funding, the collections first grew mainly through donations. In the 1880s new facilities were built on Seminaarinmäki for the teacher seminary, and the library was housed there as well.

A scientific library was later desired alongside the seminary library, and the Jyväskylä Scientific Library was founded on 1 October 1912. Its establishment was seen as a way to support efforts to bring a university to Jyväskylä, to strengthen the cultural life of Central Finland, and to ensure responsibility for the Fennica collection alongside the University of Helsinki. The University of Jyväskylä was founded in 1934, and in 1936 the Scientific Library became its library. When the College of Education was transformed into the University of Jyväskylä in 1966, the library accordingly became the University Library.

The University of Jyväskylä Library has always been located on Seminaarinmäki. Its current building stands close to the original premises, the former Viljamakasiini (grain storehouse; now the Rector’s Office), where the library operated from 1915 to 1948. From 1948 to 1958, the library was housed in the former residence of the seminary’s director, now known as the Oppio building. Before moving to its present building, designed by Arto Sipinen, in 1974, the library occupied a wing of the university’s main building designed by Alvar Aalto from 1958 to 1974.

In the early days, the library's acquisition of volumes was based heavily on donations and small-scale acquisitions. Over the years, the number of donations has decreased, and today the library's acquisition of volumes is based on books available under the Free Copy Act and the library's own purchases.

The largest and most significant single acquisition in the library's history was the purchase of the bankrupt estate of the Minerva antiquarian bookshop in 1914. The library purchased nine train carriages of books from the antiquarian bookshop at that time. This acquisition forms the basis of the library's Fennica collection.

== Special Collections ==
Through donations and acquisitions, the library has formed various special collections. These include rare books, private collections, and, for example, poster collections.

Rare book collections

- Missale Aboense (1488 ; Online exhibition of the Missale Aboense)
- Incunabula
- Medieval parchment
- Broadside ballads
- Special theses from the Helsinki Gymnastics Institute
- Old Map Service
- Film and sports posters
- Ex libris collections
- Stretch literature (venykekirjallisuus)
- Notices issued by foreign embassies formerly located in Finland
- News and press reviews from international news agencies operating in Finland (mainly from 1934–1962)
- Lectures and presentations related to Poland from the 1930s
- Index of newspaper articles from Central Finland, 1891–1921 and 1950–1980

Personal Collections

- Niilo Mäki Collection
- Tahko Pihkala Collection
- Heikki Waris Collection
- Martti Korpilahti Collection
- Juhani Siljo Manuscript Collection
- Isa Asp Manuscript Collection

== Chief Librarians and Directors ==
Before actual university library status:

- Martti Airila (seminar lecturer) 1912–1917 (as librarian)
- Niilo Rikhard Jussila 1917–1930 (as librarian)
- Walter Appelqvist 1930–1941 (first full-time director)
- Nils Berndtson 1945–1953
- Pekka Raittila 1954–1962

Chief Librarians during the University Library:

- Eeva-Maija Tammekann 1965–1980
- Oili Kokkonen 1980–1996
- Kai Ekholm 1997–2002
- Pirjo Vatanen 2002–2010

Library directors:

- Kimmo Tuominen 2010–2013
- Ari Muhonen 2013–2017

Open Science Centre directors:

- Ari Muhonen 2017–2021
- Pekka Olsbo 2021–2023
- Irene Ylönen 2024–2025
- Arto Ikonen (vt.) 2025-

== See also ==
- List of libraries in Finland
