= List of libraries in Finland =

This is a list of libraries in Finland.

== Libraries by region ==
=== Åland ===
- Mariehamn City Library

=== Central Finland ===
- Jyväskylä University Library

=== Central Ostrobothnia ===
- Jyväskylä City Library

=== Kainuu ===
- Kajaani City Library

=== Kanta-Häme ===
- Hämeenlinna City Library

=== Kymenlaakso ===
- Kotka City Library

=== Lapland ===
- Lapland University Library
- Rovaniemi Library

=== North Karelia ===
- Karelia University of Applied Sciences Library, Joensuu

=== North Ostrobothnia ===
- Oulu City Library
- Oulu University Library

=== North Savo ===
- Kuopio City Library
- Library of the University of Eastern Finland, Kuopio
- National Repository Library, Kuopio

=== Ostrobothnia ===
- Tritonia Academic Library, Vaasa

=== Päijät-Häme ===
- Joint Library of Higher Education Institutions, Lahti
- LUT Academic Library, Lahti

=== Pirkanmaa ===
- Tampere Central Library
- Tampere University Library

=== Satakunta ===
- Pori City Library

=== South Karelia ===
- Lappeenranta Science Library

=== South Ostrobothnia ===
- Alajärvi Library
- Seinäjoki Library

=== South Savo ===
- Mikkeli Regional Library

=== Southwest Finland ===
- Åbo Akademi University Library, Turku
- Turku City Library
  - Turku Main Library
- Turku University Library

=== Uusimaa ===
- Aalto University Library, Espoo
- Finnish Literature Society Library, Helsinki
- Helsinki Central Library Oodi
- Helsinki City Library
  - Library 10, 2005–2018
- Helsinki German Library
- Helsinki Metropolitan Area Libraries
- Helsinki University Library
- Kallio Library, Helsinki
- Library of Parliament, Finland, Helsinki
- Library of the Labour Movement, Helsinki
- National Archives of Finland Library, Helsinki
- National Library of Finland, Helsinki
- National Library of Health Sciences, Helsinki
- Rikhardinkatu library, Helsinki
- Sibelius Academy Library, Helsinki
- Sports Library of Finland, Helsinki
- Vallila Library, Helsinki

== See also ==
- Finnish literature
- Legal deposit in Finland
- List of archives in Finland

in Finnish

- AMKIT Consortium of university libraries (in Finnish)
- Finnish law libraries (in Finnish)
- Finnish Library Association (in Finnish)
- Finnish Music Library Association (in Finnish)
- Finnish Research Library Association (in Finnish)
- List of provincial libraries in Finland (in Finnish)
