= Arto Sipinen =

Finnish architect

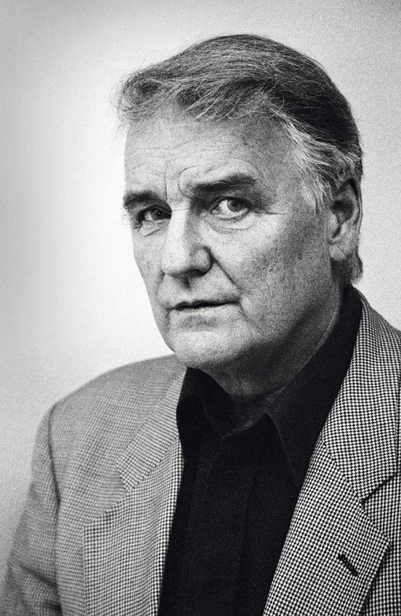
- Arto Sipinen in 2002
- Born: 20 March 1936; Helsinki, Finland
- Died: 23 December 2017 (aged 81); Espoo, Finland
- Education: Helsinki University of Technology
- Occupation: Architect

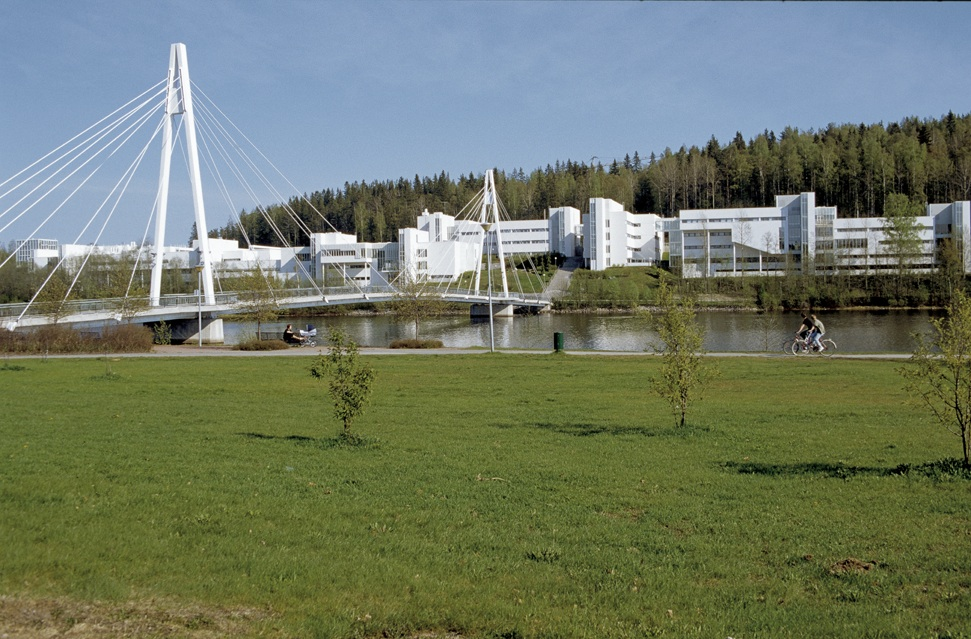
University of Jyväskylä, Ylistönrinne campus

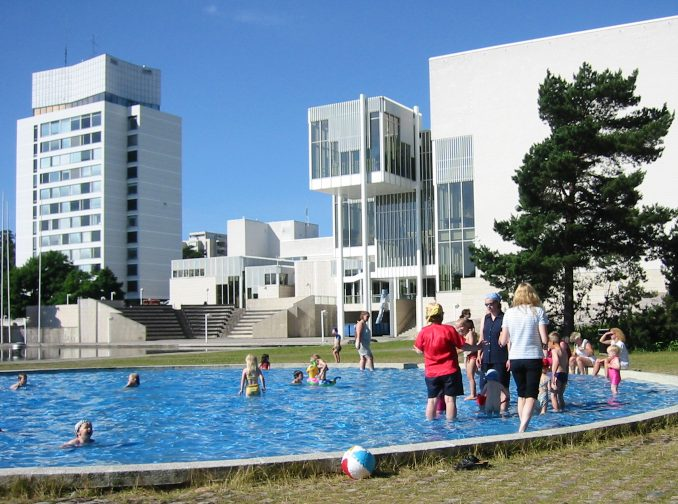
Espoo cultural centre

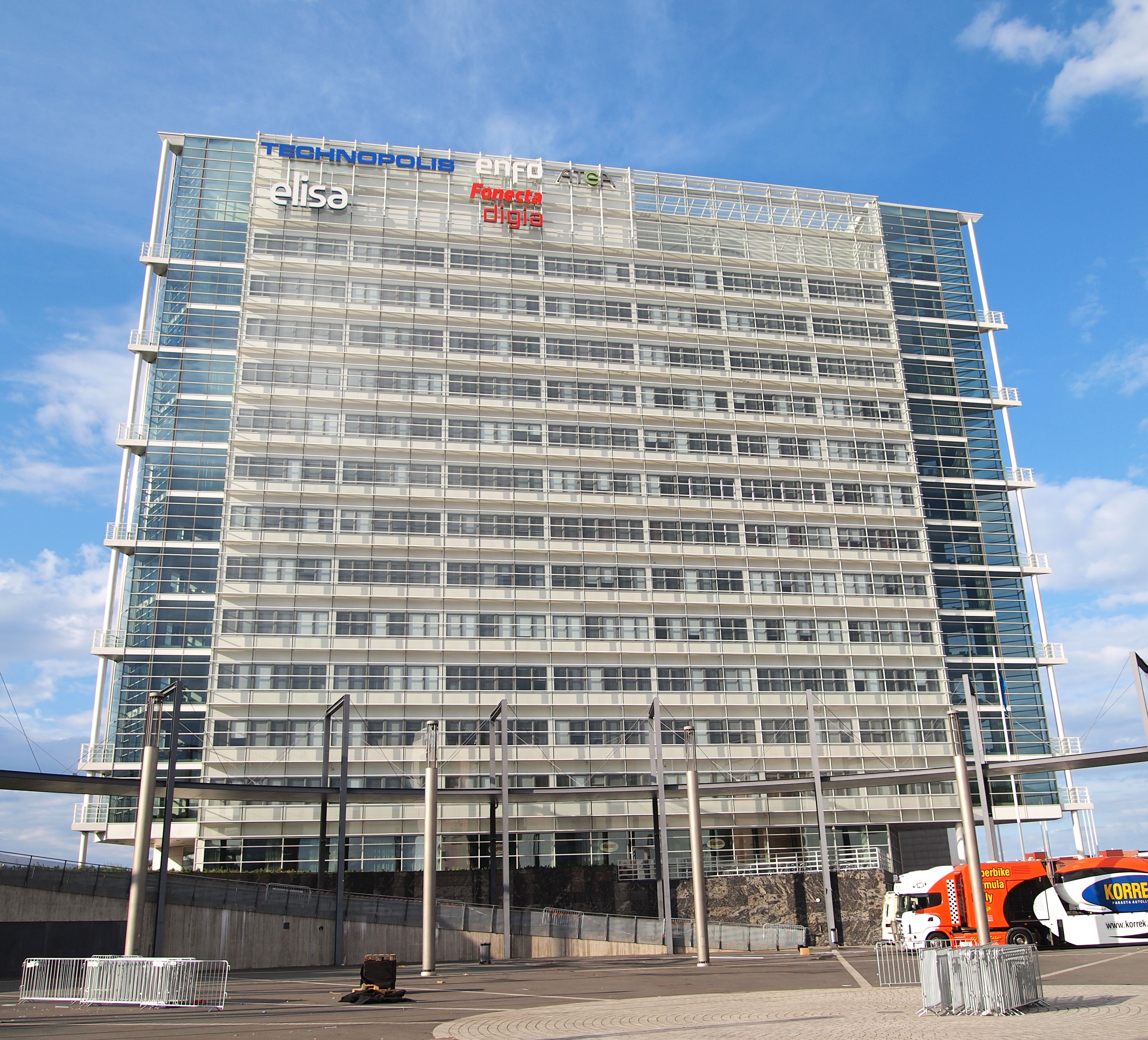
Innova tower in Jyväskylä

Arto Sipinen (20 March 1936 – 23 December 2017) was a Finnish architect. He worked in the office of architects Alvar Aalto in 1959–61 and Viljo Revell in 1961–63. He founded his own architect's office in 1965. Sipinen has taught at Helsinki University of Technology Department of Architecture.

In 1970 Sipinen won the architectural competition for the design of a new campus at the University of Jyväskylä, his former employer Aalto having designed the first campus. Among Sipinen's other best known works are the cultural centres for the cities of Espoo, Mikkeli, Imatra and Kuusamo.

Sipinen's son Ari Sipinen is a practicing architect who has designed several refurbishments for his father's buildings, most notably the Jyväskylä University Library that won the 2022 Finlandia Prize for Architecture.
