= Open Science Centre =

Open Science Centre (OSC) is an independent institute of the University of Jyväskylä, established in 2017 by merging the functions of the University of Jyväskylä Library and the Jyväskylä University Museum. Around 70 people work at the Open Science Centre.

The Open Science Centre promotes open and responsible science. According to Section 19 of the University of Jyväskylä Regulations, “The Open Science Centre preserves, produces and shares knowledge and scientific information for the benefit of the University community and society.”

The Centre is also responsible for cultural and natural heritage services and research support services belonging to its operations, as well as for the teaching of research skills.

== Directors ==
- Ari Muhonen 2017–2021
- Pekka Olsbo 2021–2023
- Irene Ylönen 2024–2025
