= Yrjö Lindegren =

Finnish architect (1900-1952)

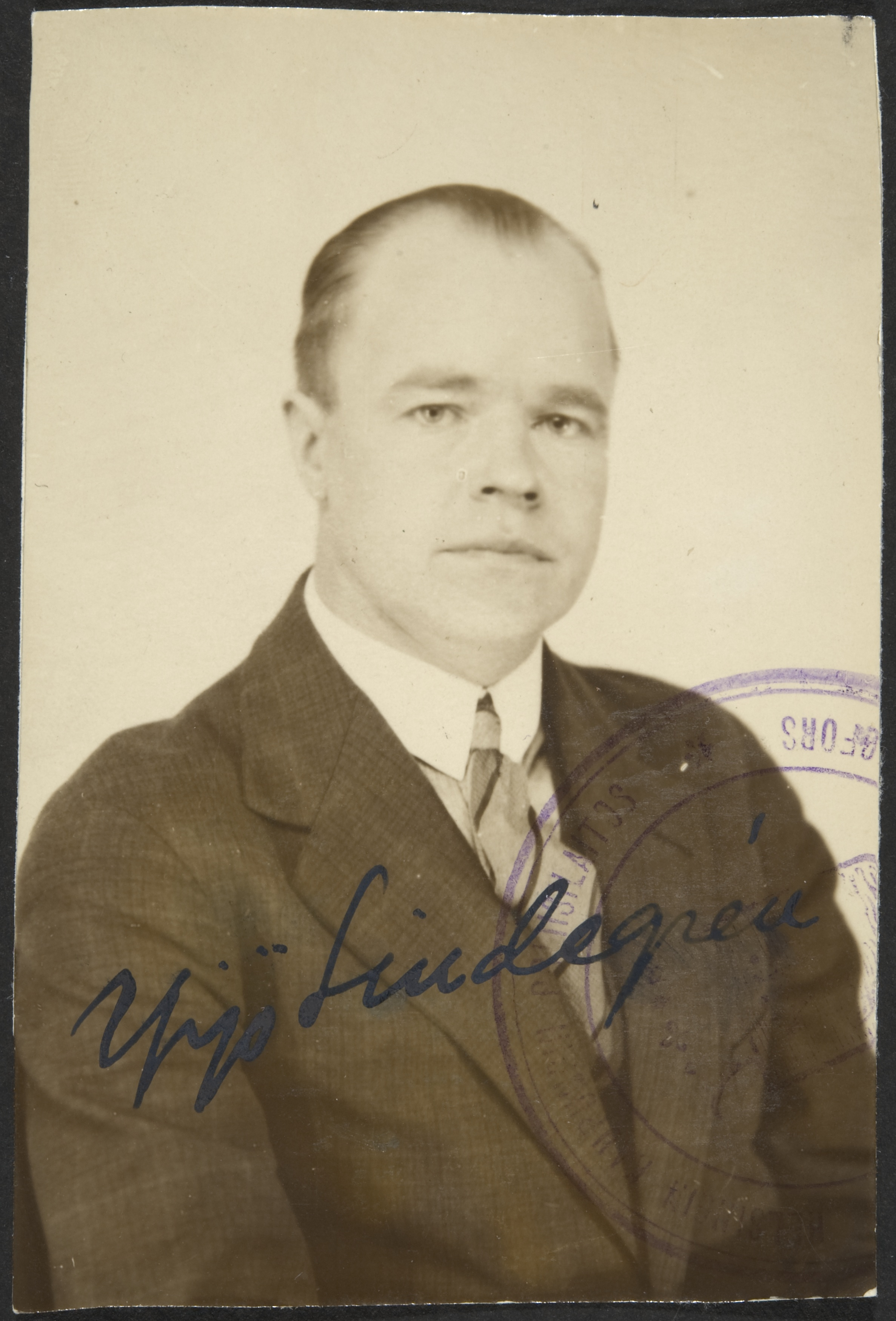
- Yrjö Lindegren in the 1930s

Medal record

Art Competition
Gold medal – first place	1948 London	Town planning

Yrjö Lorenzo Lindegren (13 August 1900 – 12 November 1952) was a Finnish architect and Olympic gold medalist.

Lindegren was born in Tampere. He graduated as an architect in 1925 from the Helsinki University of Technology, and set up his own office later the same year.

Lindegren's best-known work is the Helsinki Olympic Stadium, which he designed together with Toivo Jäntti in the early 1930s. After the 1940 Summer Olympics in Helsinki were cancelled due to the Second World War, he ended up competing in the Olympics himself before his stadium was used for the Games. He won the Olympic gold medal in the town planning category of architecture at the 1948 Summer Olympics in London.

Lindegren won the Grand Prix in architecture at the 1937 World's Fair in Paris, France. In the mid-1940s, he worked together with Alvar Aalto and Viljo Revell, making several community plans for the post-World War II Finland. He also designed the Docomomo-listed Serpentine House apartment building in Helsinki.

Lindegren died in Helsinki in 1952, shortly after becoming a professor and the 1952 Summer Olympics were held at the Helsinki Olympic Stadium.
