= Lukumanu Iddrisu =

Ghanaian-born Finnish politician

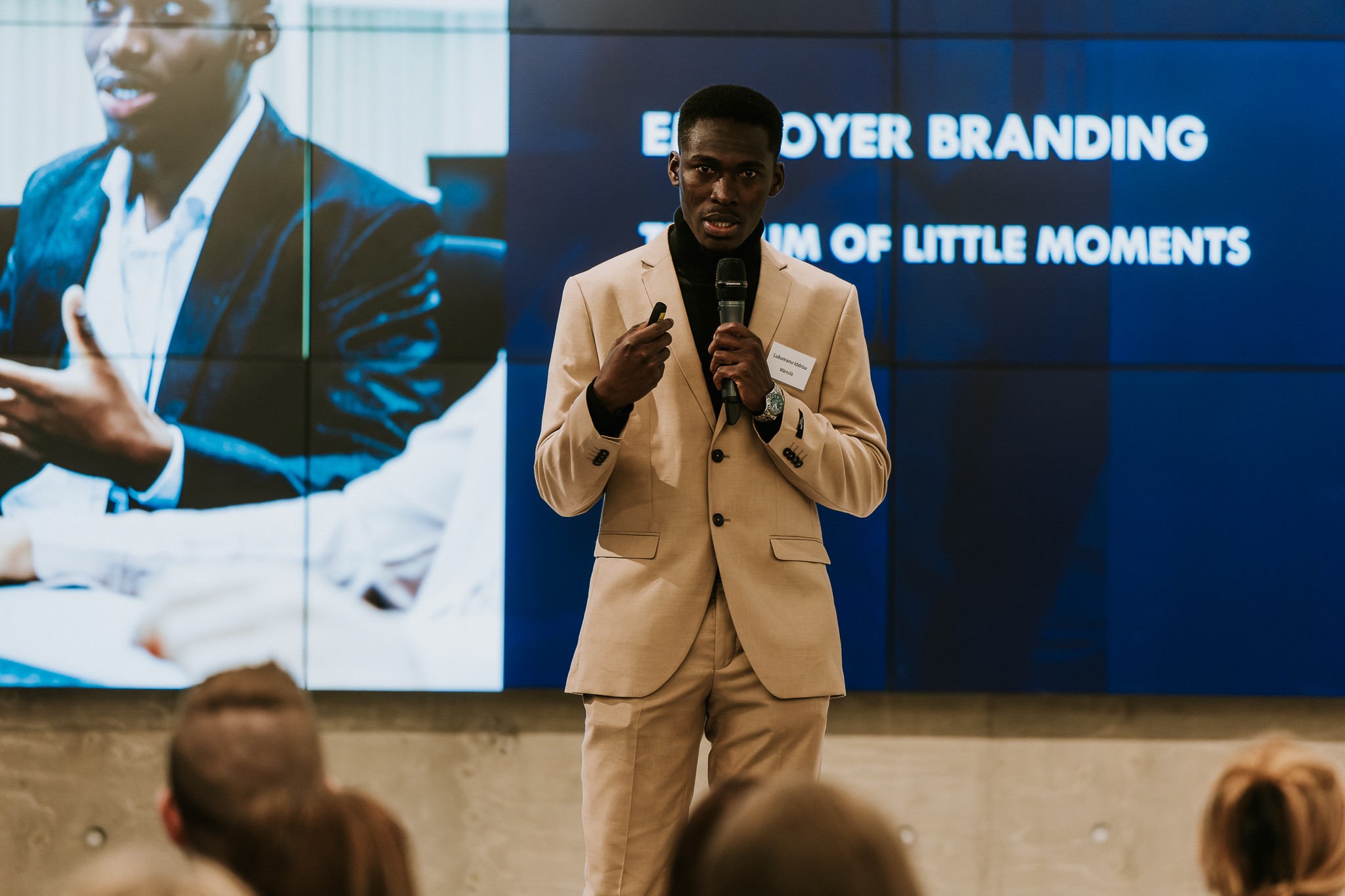

Member of the Vaasa City Council
- Incumbent
- Assumed office June 1, 2025

Personal details
- Born: Tema, Ghana
- Party: Social Democratic Party of Finland
- Education: Vaasa University of Applied Sciences; University of Vaasa
- Occupation: HR Professional, Politician
- Known for: First Ghanaian-elect municipal councilor in Finland

Lukumanu Iddrisu is a Ghanaian-Finnish HR professional, academic, and politician. In 2025, he became the first Ghanaian elected as a municipal councilor in Finland, representing the Social Democratic Party on the Vaasa City Council.

== Early life and education ==
Iddrisu was born in Tema, Ghana, and moved to Vaasa, Finland, in 2014 to pursue higher education. He obtained a Bachelor's degree in International Business from Vaasa University of Applied Sciences (VAMK), followed by a Master's degree in Strategic Business Development from the University of Vaasa. His master's thesis, titled "Employer Branding: Model for Employer Branding Practices in a Multinational Technology Company," was awarded Best Thesis in his program in 2022.

== Career ==
Upon arriving in Finland, Iddrisu began working as a cleaner while continuing his studies. Over time, he progressed into roles in human resources and project management. He has participated in initiatives aimed at supporting international students and job seekers in Finland, using his personal experiences to help others navigate Finnish society and pursue their career aspirations.

== Community involvement ==
Iddrisu has been involved in initiatives focused on community development and the promotion of diversity and inclusion in Vaasa and across Finland. He has contributed to projects supporting the integration of international residents into Finnish society and has participated in activities encouraging multicultural interaction.

== Awards and recognition ==
In 2021, Iddrisu was named the first-ever Alumnus of the Year by Vaasa University of Applied Sciences, becoming the first Ghanaian to receive this recognition in Finland. The same year, he was recognized as the Best Summer Employee of the Year, an award highlighting his positive attitude and proactive approach in the workplace. In 2022, Iddrisu's master's thesis was awarded Best Thesis in the Strategic Business Development program at the University of Vaasa.

== Political career ==
In the 2025 municipal elections, Iddrisu was elected to the Vaasa City Council with 288 votes, becoming the first individual of Ghanaian origin to hold the position in Finland. He is one of three councilors on the Vaasa City Council with an international background.
