= National Repository Library =

Coordinates: 62.9297°N 27.6850°E

The National Repository Library is an agency under the Finnish Ministry of Education and Culture that collects lesser-used items donated by other libraries. Such centralized collection saves storage costs and avoids the items being destroyed as the libraries can no longer justify keeping them in their collections.

== See also ==
- List of libraries in Finland
