= Serpentine House =

Coordinates: 60.212041°N 24.943063°E

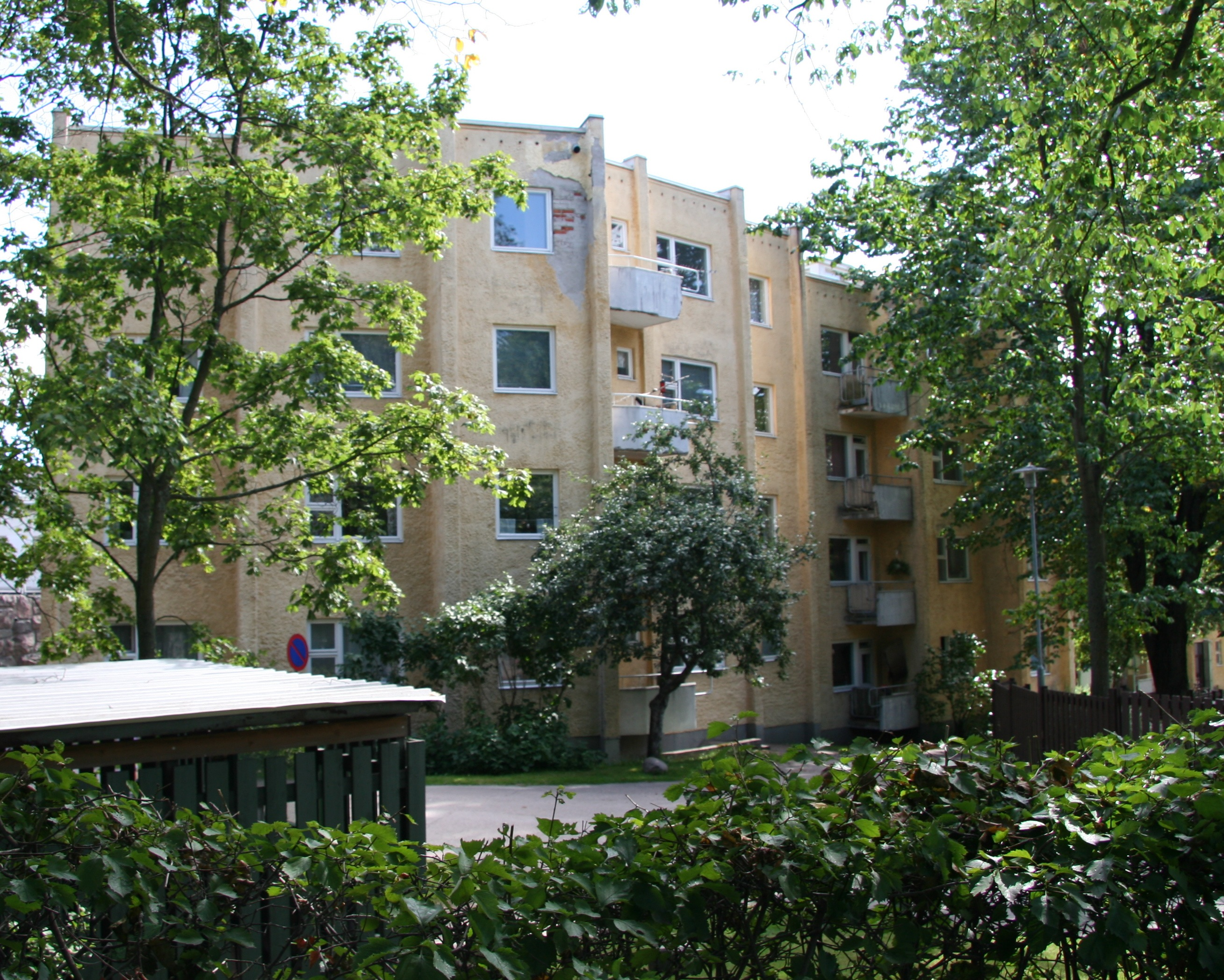
Serpentine House, photographed from Tursontie side.

Serpentine House (Finnish: Käärmetalo, Swedish: Ormhuset) is a modernist apartment building complex on Mäkelänkatu in the Käpylä district of Helsinki, Finland. The complex was designed by Yrjö Lindegren and opened in 1952. It is owned by the City of Helsinki apartments company and comprises 189 rental apartments in two four-storey buildings. A two-storey service building houses a day-care center and a swimming hall. The apartment buildings also include some commercial space. The complex gets its name from the twisty form of the buildings.

The yard was designed by landscape architect Elisabeth Koch in 1953. It was last renovated in the 1980s preserving the essential characteristics of the original garden design.

The City of Helsinki is in the process of protecting Serpentine House as of March 2014. Once the zoning changes with the protection details have been approved, the badly deteriorated buildings will undergo extensive renovations. The apartments still include original furnishings (for instance in the kitchens) which will also be repaired. The renovation is expected to cost 28 million euros. The renovation of the first building was finished in May 2018 and it is now a lighter color closer to the original 1950s look. The renovation of the second building starts in the Fall 2018.

Serpentine House is listed by Docomomo as a significant example of modern architecture in Finland. Finland's National Board of Antiquities has also listed it as a nationally significant built cultural environment together with Käpylä's wooden house districts.
