= Vaasa University of Applied Sciences =

Institute of higher education in Vaasa, Finland

Coordinates: 63.092°N 21.616°E

Vaasan ammattikorkeakoulu VAMK, University of Applied Sciences
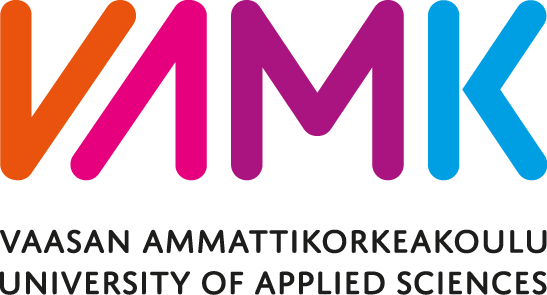
- Established: 1996
- Rector: Hannu Vahtera
- Administrative staff: 200
- Students: 4,000
- Location: Vaasa, Finland
- Website: https://www.vamk.fi/en/

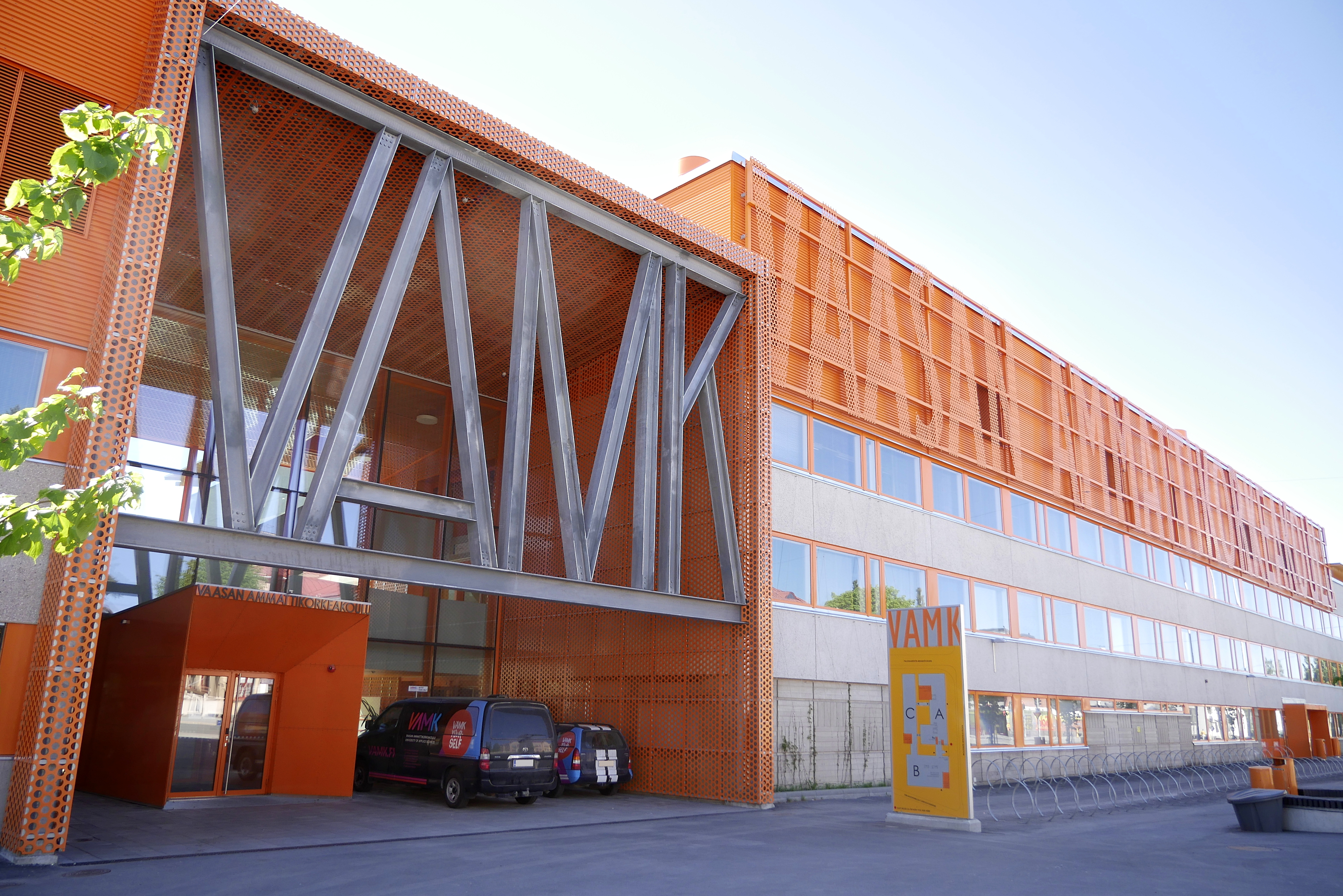
Vaasa University of Applied Sciences

Vaasa University of Applied Sciences (Finnish: Vaasan ammattikorkeakoulu, Vamk, Swedish: Vasa yrkeshögskola) also known as VAMK, is an international higher education institution in Vaasa, Finland. VAMK educates Bachelors of Business Administration, Engineering, Hospitality Management and Social Services as well as Registered Nurses and Public Health Nurses in Finnish, Swedish and English. It has approximately 4,000 students enrolled and a staff of circa 200 members.

== Programmes ==
VAMK offers education in three languages for 17 degree programmes. In addition to the Finnish degree programmes, VAMK has three Swedish and three English degree programmes. Classes at the University of Applied Sciences are composed of theoretical, professional studies, practical training in a specialty field and the final thesis.

== International profile ==
Around one eleventh of all VAMK students are those studying abroad. Yearly about 300 students from abroad, in addition to some 80 exchange students, pursue studies leading to a degree.

Each student can choose to get international experience by taking part of the studies or the practical training abroad. Yearly approximately 150 students of VAMK go abroad.

== Alumnus of the Year ==
In October, 2021, the Vaasa University of Applied Sciences held their first ever alumni event and chose the alumnus of the year. The award for Alumnus of the Year was given for the first time to Lukumanu Iddrisu, a community builder and an employee of Wärtsilä. The Alumnus of the Year award is given to a VAMK alumnus from any of the schools (Business, Engineering and Health Care & Social Sciences) who has distinguished him/herself and has made a positive impact on and off campus following the VAMK values of professionality, sympathy, integrity, responsibility and openness.
