= National Library of Finland =

Library in Helsinki, Finland

Coordinates: 60°10′13″N 024°57′01″E

- Kansalliskirjasto; Nationalbiblioteket

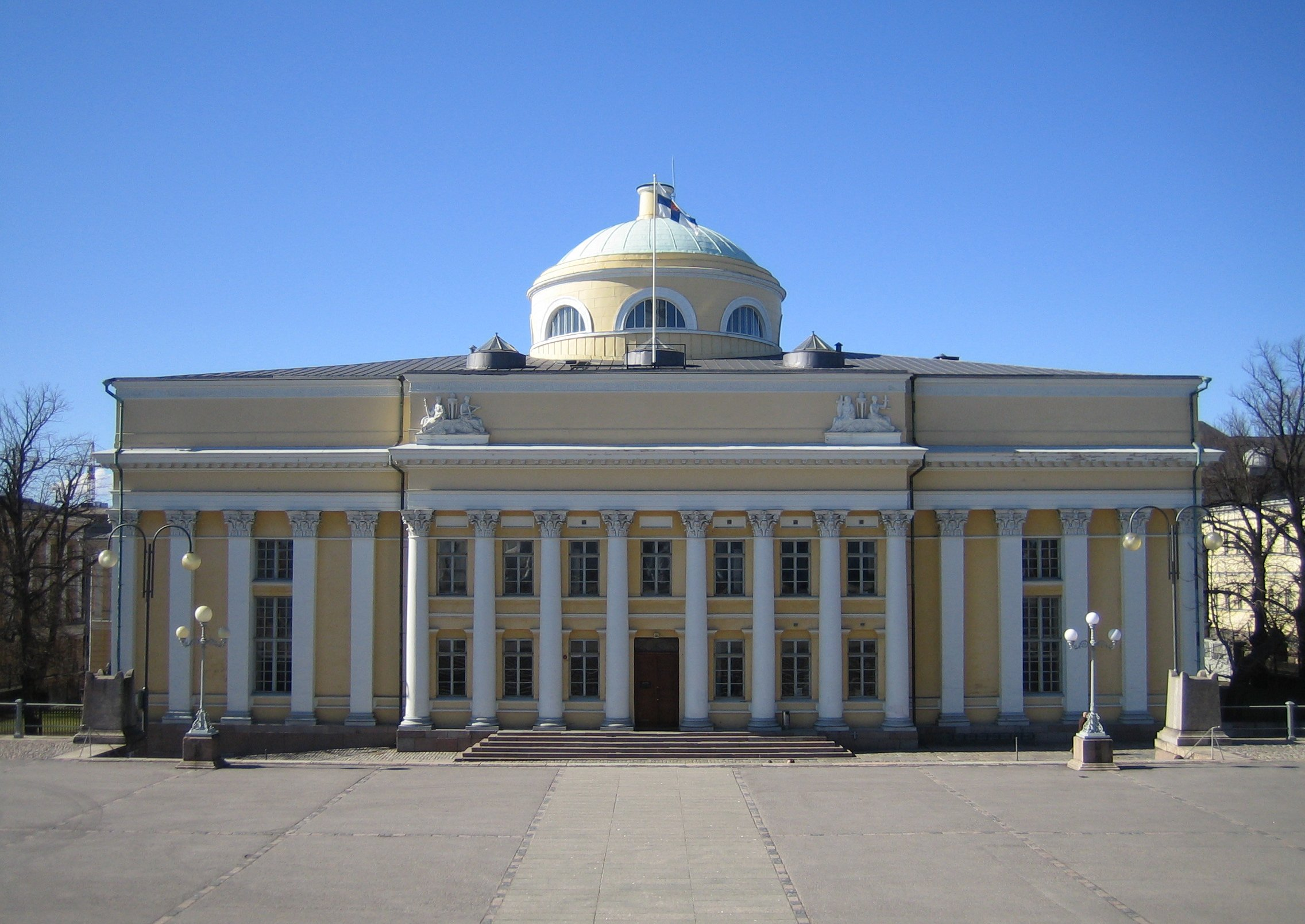
- The main building of the National Library of Finland
- Location: Helsinki (formerly Turku)
- Type: National library
- Established: 1640

Collection
- Size: 3M items
- Legal deposit: Yes

Other information
- Director: Kai Ekholm
- Employees: 264 (2014)
- Website: www.nationallibrary.fi/en

The National Library of Finland (Finnish: Kansalliskirjasto, Swedish: Nationalbiblioteket) is the foremost research library in Finland. Administratively the library is part of the University of Helsinki. From 1919 to 1 August 2006, it was known as the Helsinki University Library (Finnish: Helsingin yliopiston kirjasto).

The National Library is responsible for storing the Finnish cultural heritage. By Finnish law, the National Library is a legal deposit library and receives copies of all printed matter, as well as audiovisual materials excepting films, produced in Finland or for distribution in Finland. These copies are then distributed by the Library to its own national collection and to reserve collections of five other university libraries. Also, the National Library has the obligation to collect and preserve materials published on the Internet to its web archive Finnish Web Archive. The library also maintains the online public access catalog Finna.

Any person who lives in Finland may register as a user of the National Library and borrow library material. The publications in the national collection, however, are not loaned outside the library. The library also is home to one of the most comprehensive collections of books published in the Russian Empire of any library in the world.

The National Library is located in Helsinki, close to the Senaatintori square. The oldest part of the library complex, designed by Carl Ludvig Engel, dates back to 1844. The newer extension Rotunda, designed by architect Gustaf Nyström, was completed in 1906. The bulk of the collection is, nonetheless, stored in Kirjaluola (Finnish for “book cave”), a 57,600-cubic-metre (2,030,000 cu ft) underground bunker drilled into solid rock, 18 metres (59 ft) below the library.

C.L. Engel and Gustaf Nyström, University Architects

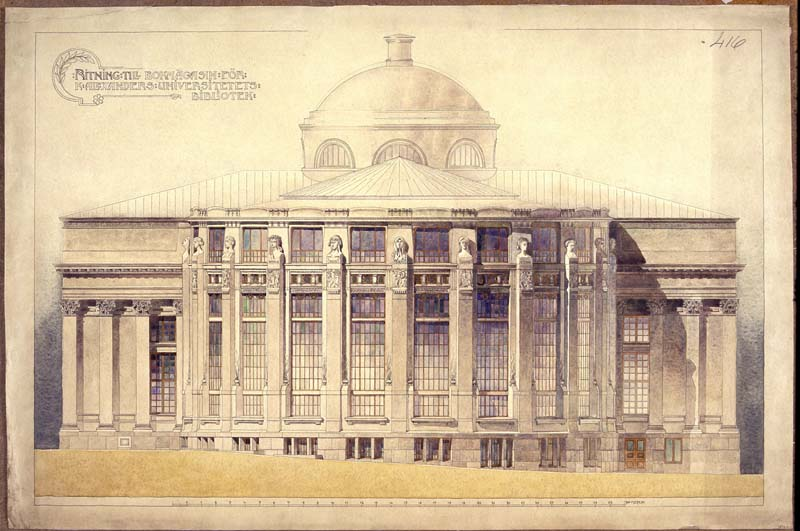
Rotunda by Gustaf Nyström

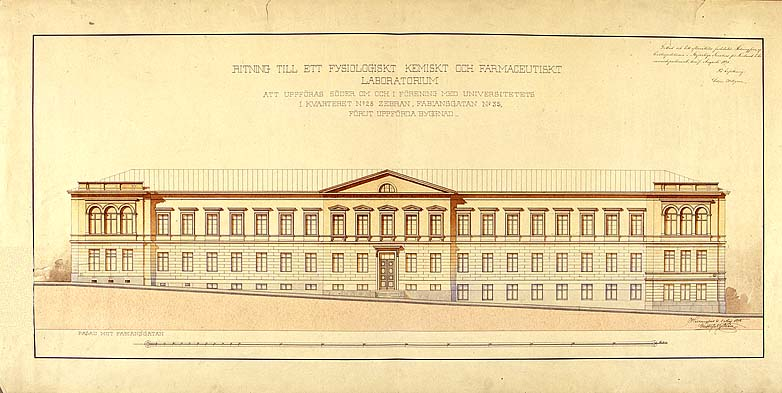
Fabiania (View from Fabianinkatu)

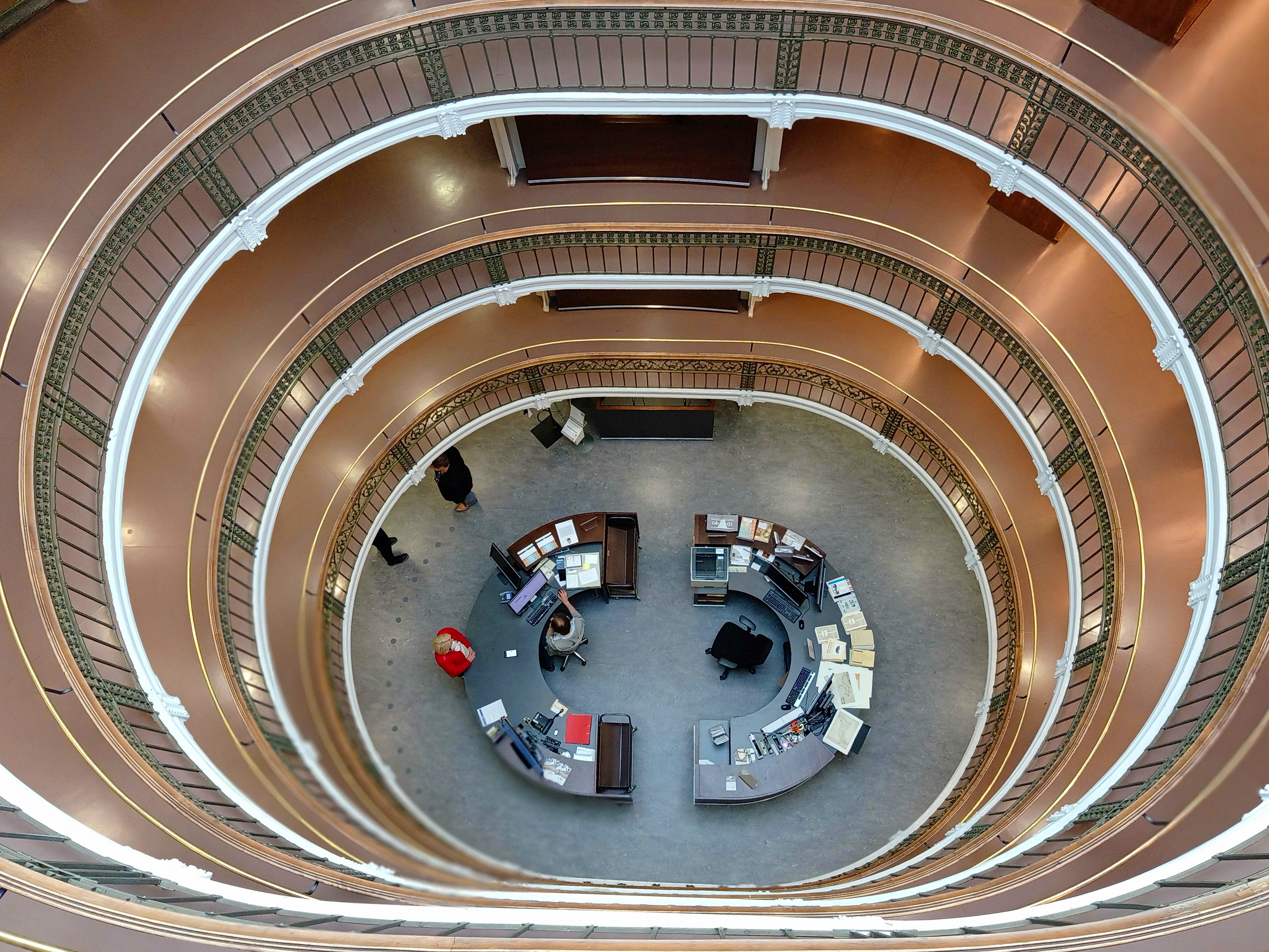
Inside view of National Library of Finland 001

== See also ==
- University of Helsinki
- Helsinki Central Library
- List of libraries in Finland
