= Helsinki University Library =

Library in Helsinki, Finland

Coordinates: 60.1714°N 24.9483°E

- Helsingin yliopiston kirjasto
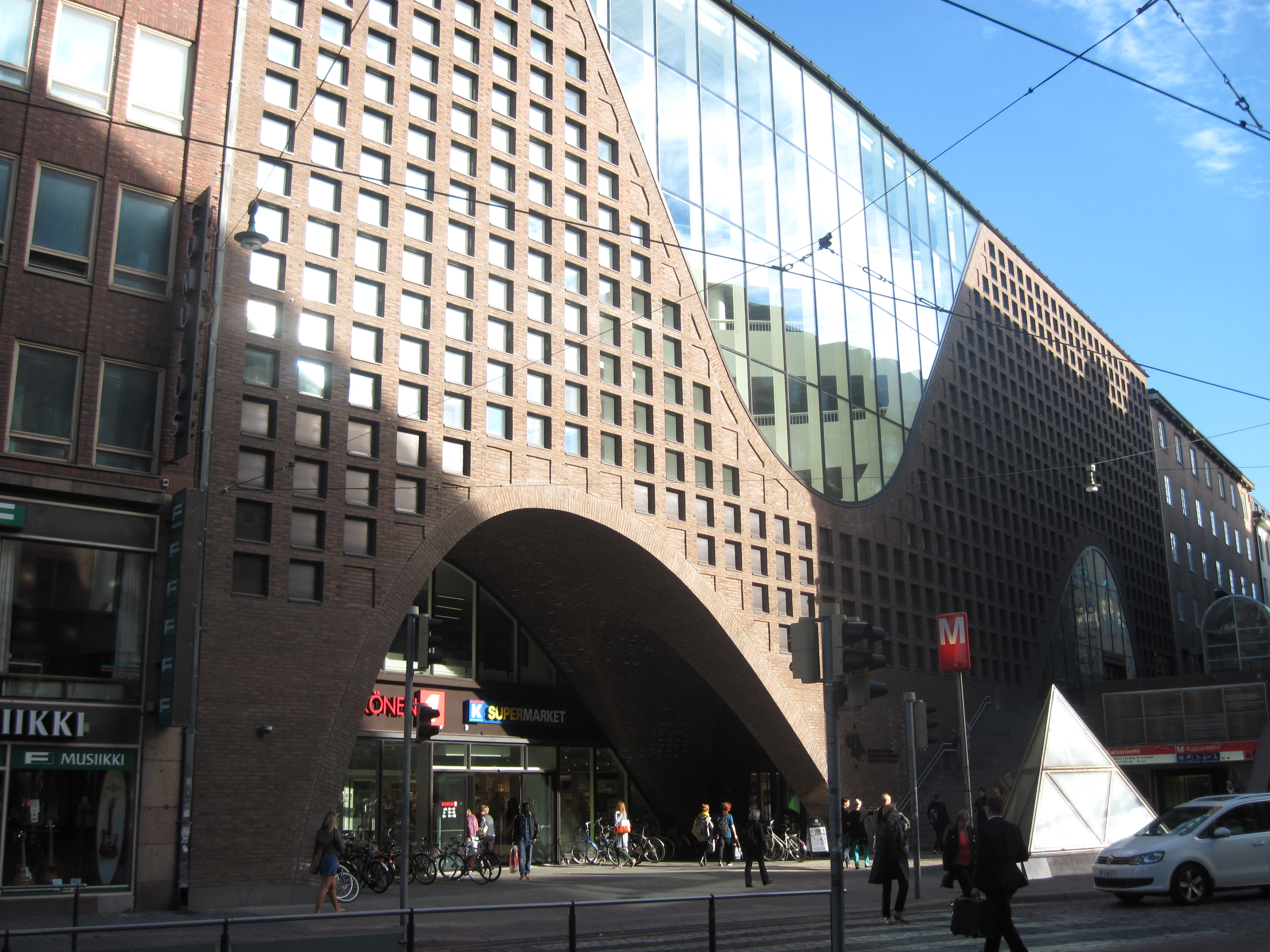
- Main Library in the Kaisa House is located in Kaisaniemi, Helsinki
- Location: Finland
- Type: Academic library
- Established: 1 January 2010

Other information
- Website: www.helsinki.fi/en/helsinki-university-library

The Helsinki University Library (Finnish: Helsingin yliopiston kirjasto) is the largest multidisciplinary university library in Finland. It was established on 1 January 2010. The Helsinki University Library is an independent institute of the University of Helsinki and open to all information seekers.

The Helsinki University Library includes the Main Library in the Kaisa House, Kumpula, Meilahti and Viikki Campus Libraries, as well as internal library services. The library offers information and library services in the fields of science of all four campuses of the University of Helsinki.

== Key information ==
About 1.9 million customers visit the Helsinki University Library annually. There are about 40,400 active borrowers per year, and of them 11,000 are new customers.

Everyone has the right to use the library, and persons over the age of 15 who live in Finland have the right to borrow books. Electronic materials are available for use to all customers in the library facilities and for the university community also online.

The library offers its customers wide collections of printed and electronic materials. There are altogether about 73.5 shelf-kilometres of printed books and journals. Printed materials are borrowed and renewed altogether 2.6 million times annually. There are about 33,000 licensed electronic journals and 356,000 electronic books available.

The Meilahti Campus Library Terkko is the WHO Documentation Center in Finland. One of the European Documentation Centres in Finland is located in the Main Library in the Kaisa House.

== See also ==
- List of libraries in Finland

== Sources ==
- Helsinki University Library Website
- Helsinki University Library Annual Report 2013
