= Kallio Library =

Public library in Helsinki, Finland

Coordinates: 60.1836°N 24.9536°E

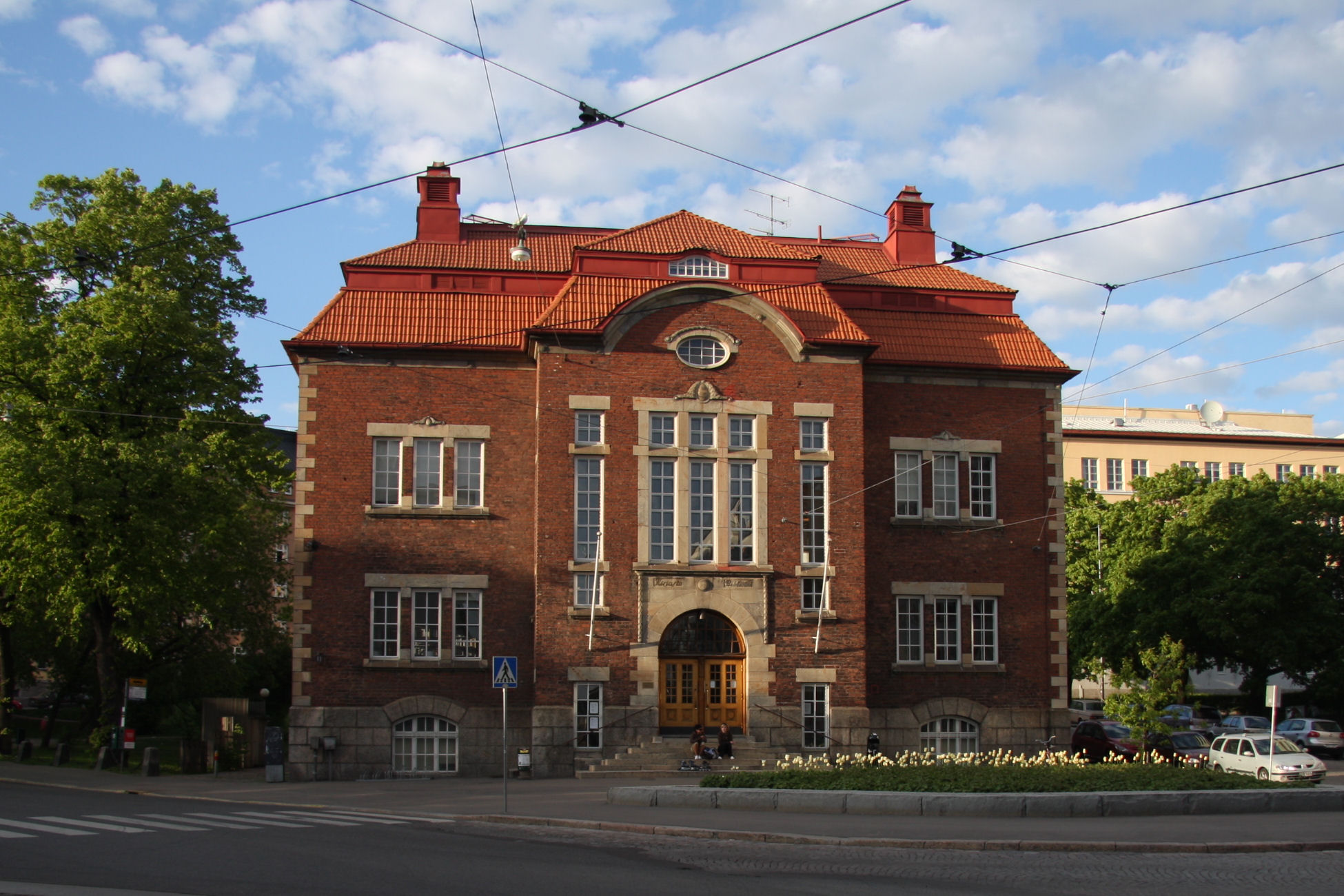
Kallio Library

Kallio Library (Finnish: Kallion kirjasto) is a public library in the Kallio district of Helsinki. The red brick building, which was designed by Karl Hård af Segerstad and finished in 1912, was the first library in Finland financed entirely by the public sector.

== See also ==
- List of libraries in Finland
