= Rikhardinkatu library =

Public library in Helsinki, Finland

Coordinates: 60°09′58.4″N 24°56′46″E

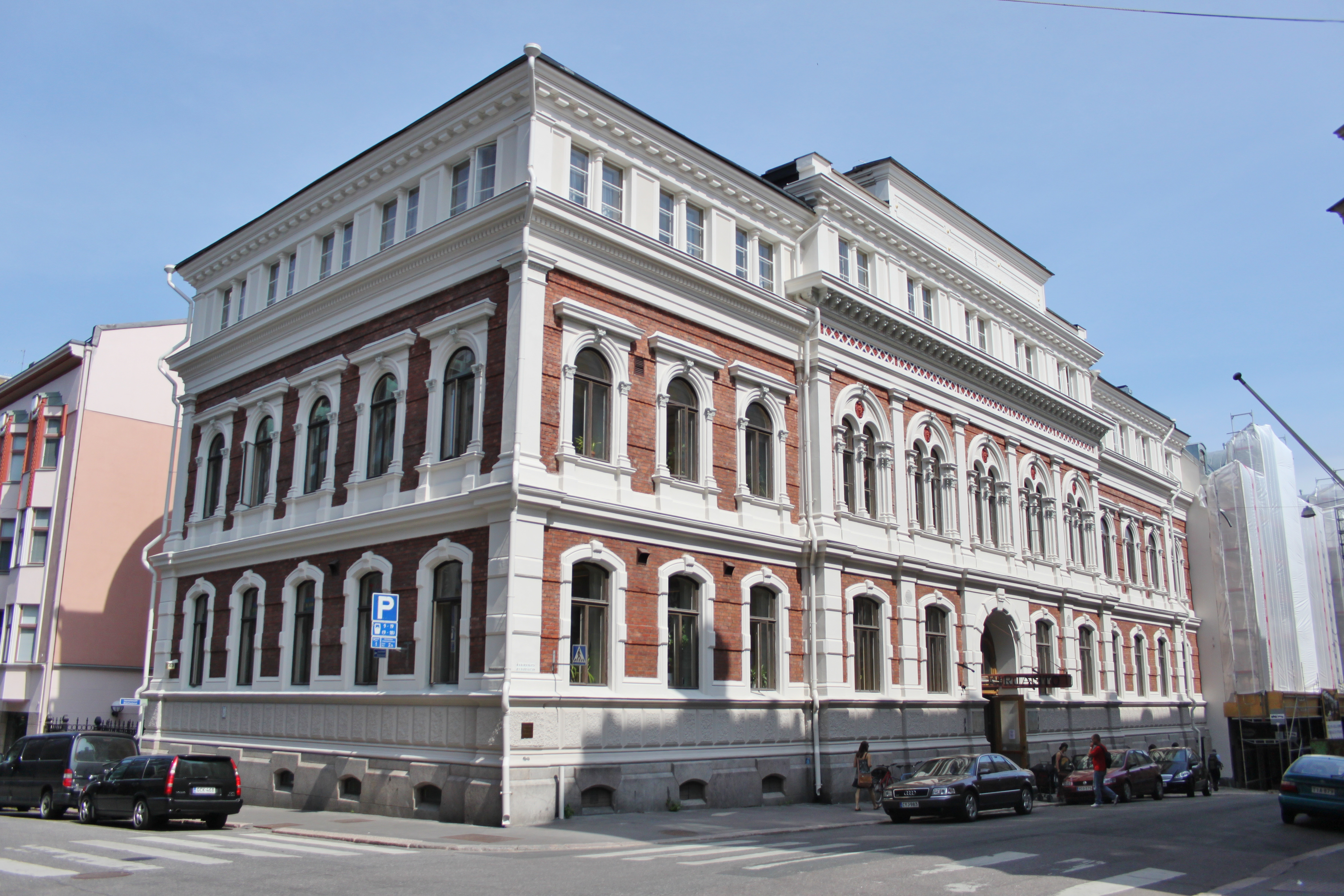
The Rikhardinkatu library in July 2011.

The Rikhardinkatu library is a public library in Kaartinkaupunki, Helsinki, Finland.

== History ==
The library building, representing the Renaissance Revival architecture, was designed by Finnish architect Theodor Höijer and was built in 1881 as the first building in the Nordic countries designed as a general library. Later, in the 1920s, an additional floor designed by architect Runar Eklund and a wing building known as the book tower were added to the inner courtyard. The library served as Helsinki's main library until 1986.

When Helsinki's new main library was opened in Itä-Pasila, renovation work lasting two years was started at the Rikhardinkatu library. The renovation, planned by professor Olof Hansson, sought to return the building's original style. The second phase of the renovation was completed in 2003, when the new Internet room and the salon of the reading hall were taken into use. New premises for music were also opened.

The library premises have also hosted the Art Association of Finland and the Finnish Society of Sciences and Letters.

At the 1882 meeting of the Diet of Finland, the common estates of Finland met at the freshly completed library building. There is a plaque mentioning this at the second floor of the library.

== See also ==
- List of libraries in Finland
