= Kivimäki =

Kivimäki is a Finnish surname. Notable people with the surname include:

- Aleksanteri Kivimäki (1997–), Finnish cybercriminal
- Erkki Kivimäki (1936–2007), Finnish diplomat
- Mika Kivimäki, Finnish social epidemiologist
- Samuli Kivimäki (1988–), Finnish ice hockey player
- Timo Kivimäki, professor of international politics at the University of Copenhagen
- Toivo Mikael Kivimäki (1886–1968), Prime Minister of Finland 1932–1936
