= Port of Vaasa =

Port in Finland

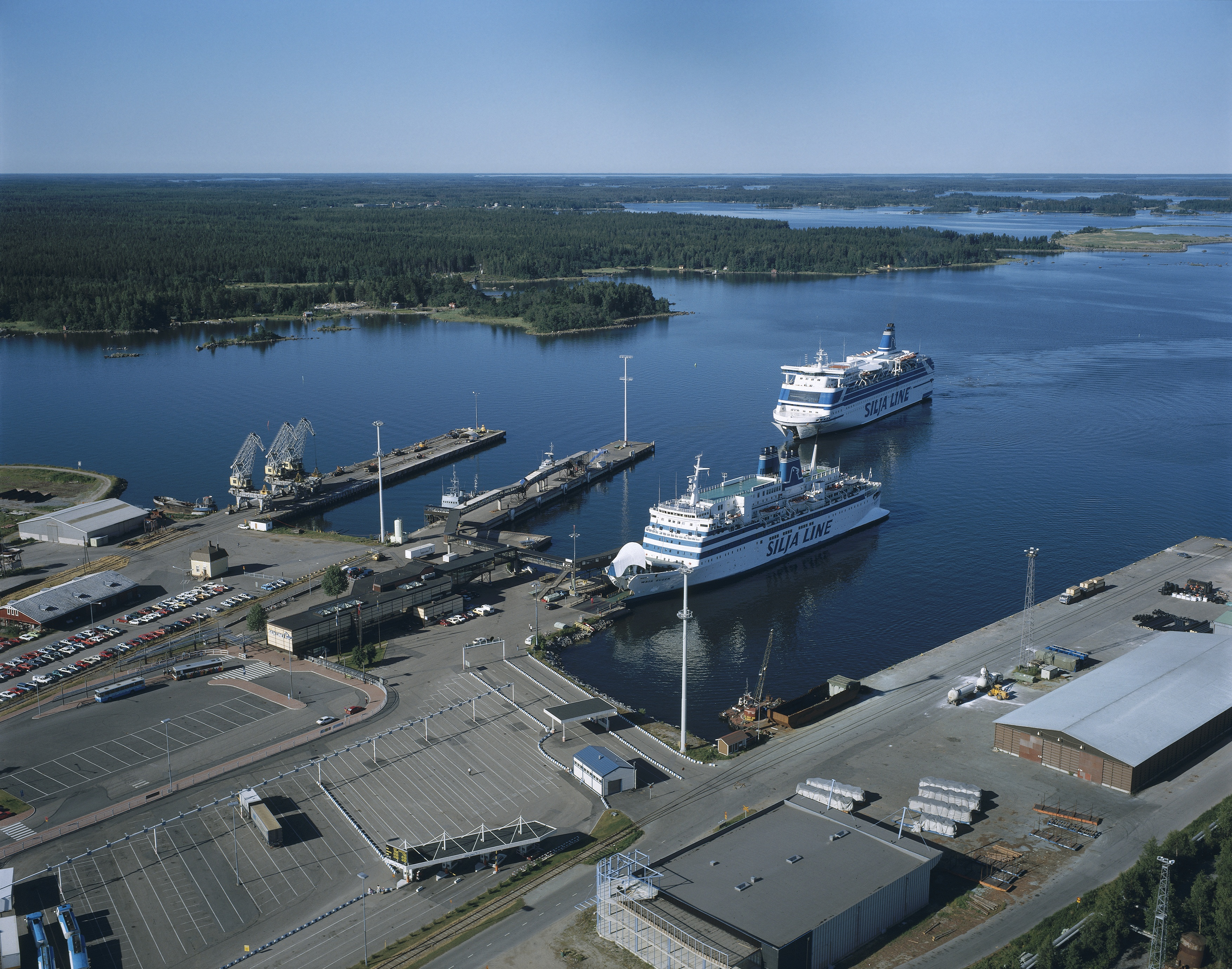
- Port of Vaasa pictured in 1994
- Click on the map for a fullscreen view
- Port of Vaasa (Finland)
- Native name: Vaasan satama – Vasa hamn

Location
- Country: Finland
- Location: Vaasa
- Coordinates: 63.087482°N 21.555966°E
- UN/LOCODE: FI VAA

Details
- Operated by: Kvarken Hamnar Ab / Merenkurkun Satamat Oy
- Type of harbour: coastal natural
- No. of wharfs: 5
- No. of piers: 2
- Draft depth: max. 9.0 metres (29.5 ft) depth

Statistics
- Annual cargo tonnage: c. 860,000 tons (int'l) (2018)
- Passenger traffic: c. 200,000 (2018)
- Website http://www.kvarkenports.com/about/vaasa.html

The Port of Vaasa (Finnish: Vaasan satama, Swedish: Vasa hamn) is a mixed-use port in the city of Vaasa on the west coast of Finland, in the Kvarken area of the Gulf of Bothnia. It is situated on the island of Vaskiluoto, some 2.5 kilometres (1.6 mi) due west of the Vaasa city centre, and connected to the mainland by the Vaskiluoto road and rail bridge. The port is serviced by the tracks and infrastructure of Vaskiluoto railway station.

In 2018, inbound (import) cargo traffic accounted for c. 80% of the port's total throughput, with the majority of this consisting of coal and oil intended as fuel for the nearby Vaskiluoto power stations.

The port also serves as a terminal for passenger and vehicle ferries to Umeå, Sweden, operated by Wasa Line. In 2018, the port handled over 200,000 passengers.

Since 2015, the ports of Vaasa and Umeå have, despite being in different countries, been operated by the same company, Kvarken Hamnar Ab / Merenkurkun Satamat Oy (literally 'Ports of Kvarken'), jointly owned by the two cities.

== Specifications ==
The port comprises the following infrastructure:

- "Rein's quay": length 145 metres (476 ft), depth 7.5 metres (25 ft)
- "Lasse's quay": length 214 metres (702 ft), depth 9.0 metres (29.5 ft)
- Coal quay: length 145 metres (476 ft), depth 9.0 metres (29.5 ft)
- Oil terminal quay: depth 9.0 metres (29.5 ft)
- Ferry (passenger) quay: two RO-RO ramps, depth 5.7–6.8 metres (19–22 ft)
- Southern pier: length 180 metres (590 ft), depth 5.0–9.0 metres (16.4–29.5 ft)
- Northern pier: two RO-RO ramps, depth 5.5–7.5 metres (18–25 ft)
- Two mobile cranes and one bulk cargo loader

== See also ==
- Ports of the Baltic Sea
