= Vaskiluoto railway station =

Railway station in Vaasa, Finland

Vaskiluoto Vasklot
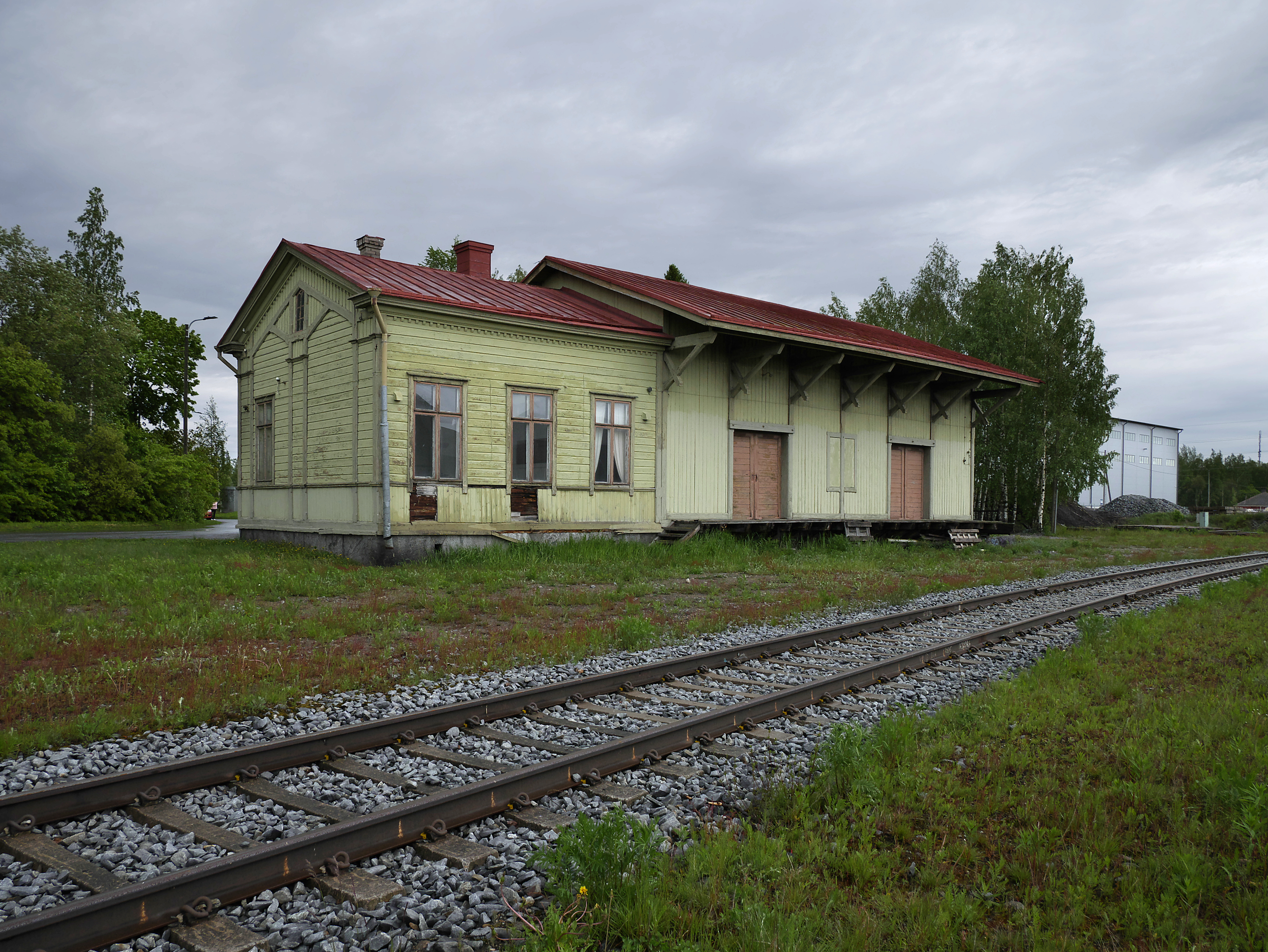

General information
- Location: Vaskiluoto, Vaasa; Finland
- Coordinates: 63°05.28′N 21°33.83′E
- System: VR freight station
- Owner: Finnish Transport Infrastructure Agency
- Operator: VR Group
- Line: Seinäjoki–Vaasa
- Tracks: Railyard with 4 tracks Several private sidings

Construction
- Architect: Bruno Granholm

Other information
- Station code: Vsk
- Classification: Operating point

History
- Opened: 1900
- Closed: 23 December 1992 (passenger services only)
Location
- Location within Ostrobothnia Location within Finland

The Vaskiluoto railway station (Finnish: Vaskiluodon rautatieasema, Swedish: Vasklot järnvägsstation) is located in the city of Vaasa, Finland, on the island and district of Vaskiluoto. It is the terminus of the Seinäjoki–Vaasa railway, and it only serves cargo transport in the port of Vaasa; the nearest station with passenger services is Vaasa.

The Finnish Heritage Agency has declared the Vaskiluoto station area a protected culture site of national importance.

== History ==
The Seinäjoki–Vaasa railway was extended from the Vaasa station towards the city's port on the island of Vaskiluoto in 1900. Two thirds of the costs of the 20 kilometres (12 mi) long harbour line were covered by the Finnish state, while the remainder was paid for by the city of Vaasa (then called Nikolainkaupunki). Its station building was built based on plans from Bruno Granholm; it was distinctive in that the station warehouse was also situated in the same building.

Passenger trains to and from Vaasa have also served Vaskiluoto over three separate periods: 1 June 1965 – 1 September 1965, 28 May 1972 – 30 September 1973, and 15 June 1977 – 23 December 1992. From 1985, the passenger station in Vaskiluoto was named Vaasan satama (Swedish: Vasa hamn, lit. 'Port of Vaasa'). Since then, the station has only served freight transport.

Large portions of the station's extensive rail yard were dismantled in the early 2000s. The line from Vaasa to Vaskiluoto was deemed a low-traffic line in 2014, and the Finnish Transport Agency proposed that its maintenance be discontinued from December 2015. However, it was thoroughly rebuilt in the autumn of 2017 as a joint venture between the city of Vaasa and the FTA: it was equipped with recycled, heavier (54 kg/m) rails, concrete sleepers, a fresh ballast layer and new switches. While the renovation only concerned the parts of the line in possession of the state, the owners of the private sidings present (namely, the city of Vaasa and Kvarken Ports) have since renewed them as well. As of 2020, the line is deemed to be in good condition.

== See also ==
- Port of Vaasa
