= Vaasa =

City in Ostrobothnia, Finland

Vaasa Vasa (Swedish)
- City
- Vaasan kaupunki Vasa stad City of Vaasa
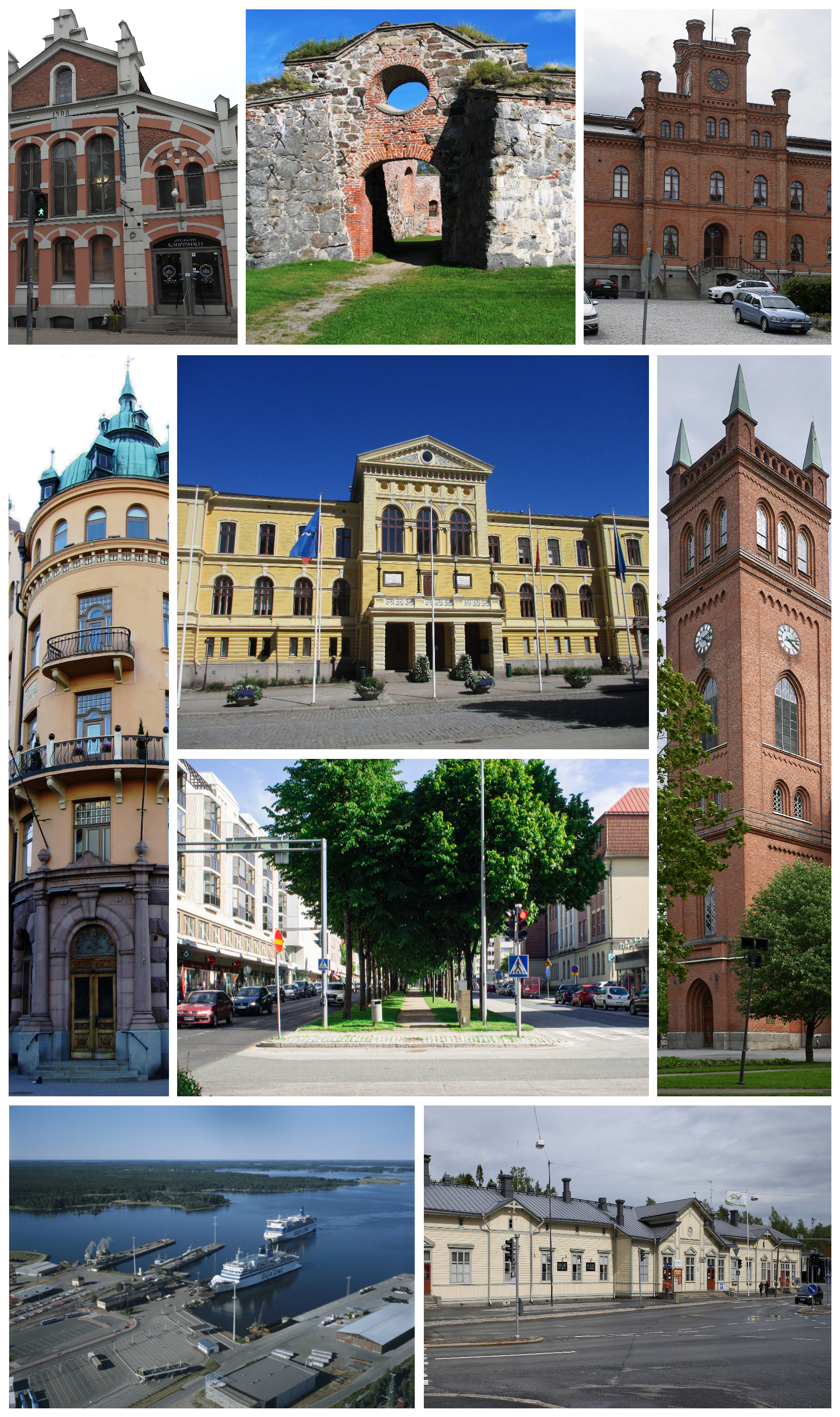
- Clockwise from top-left: Vaasa Market Hall, the ruins of Saint Mary Church, the Vaasa Court of Appeal, the Holy Trinity Church, Vaasa railway station, the Port of Vaasa in Vaskiluoto, and Kurtenia House; and in the middle (from top to bottom) Vaasa City Hall, and the Kauppapuistikko esplanade

- Flag Coat of arms

- Location of Vaasa in Finland
- Interactive map of Vaasa
- Coordinates: 63°06′N 021°37′E
- Country: Finland
- Region: Ostrobothnia
- Sub-region: Vaasa
- Charter: 2 October 1606
- Named for: House of Vasa; Nicholas I of Russia (1855–1917)
- Capital city (Note: During the Finnish Civil War): 29 January 1918 – 3 May 1918

Government
  - City manager: Tomas Häyry

Area (2018-01-01)
  - City: 545.14 km^{2} (210.48 sq mi)
  - Land: 364.84 km^{2} (140.87 sq mi)
  - Water: 208.63 km^{2} (80.55 sq mi)
  - Urban: 66.65 km^{2} (25.73 sq mi)
  - Rank: 210th largest in Finland

Population (2025-12-31)
  - City: 71,209
  - Rank: 14th largest in Finland
  - Density: 195.18/km^{2} (505.5/sq mi)
  - Urban: 65,414
  - Urban density: 981.5/km^{2} (2,542/sq mi)

Population by native language
  - Finnish: 62.2% (official)
  - Swedish: 22.8% (official)
  - Others: 14.9%

Population by age
  - 0 to 14: 15%
  - 15 to 64: 64.4%
  - 65 or older: 20.6%
- Time zone: UTC+02:00 (EET)
  - Summer (DST): UTC+03:00 (EEST)
- Climate: Dfc
- Website: www.vaasa.fi

Vaasa (Finnish: [ˈvɑːsɑ]; Swedish: Vasa, Finland Swedish: [ˈvɑːsːɑ]), formerly (1855–1917) known as Nikolaistad (Finnish: Nikolainkaupunki; lit. 'city of Nicholas'), is a city in Finland and the regional capital of Ostrobothnia, located on the west coast of the country, on the Gulf of Bothnia. Vaasa city has approximately 71,000 inhabitants, while the Vaasa sub-region has a population of approximately 112,000. It is the 14th-most populous municipality in Finland, and the tenth-most populous urban area in the country.

The settlement developed from 1606 near Korsholm; King Charles IX of Sweden granted Vaasa its municipal charter in 1611, naming the town after the Swedish royal House of Vasa. During the Finnish Civil War in 1918, Vaasa briefly served as the capital of White Finland and hosted the Senate of Finland.

The city has several institutions of higher education: the University of Vaasa, the Vaasa University of Applied Sciences, the Novia University of Applied Sciences, and some faculties of the Åbo Akademi University, the University of Helsinki, and the Hanken School of Economics.

Vaasa is a bilingual municipality with Finnish and Swedish as its official languages. The population consists of 62% Finnish speakers, 23% Swedish speakers, and 15% speakers of other languages. The municipalities surrounding Vaasa, such as Korsholm and Malax, have a clear majority of Swedish speakers. As a result, the Swedish language maintains a strong position in the city, making it the most significant cultural center for Swedish-Finns.

== History ==
=== Name ===
Over the years, Vaasa has changed its name several times. At first it was called Mustasaari or Mussor after the village where it was founded in 1606, but just a few years later the name was changed to Vasa to honor the royal Swedish lineage. The name Mustasaari (Finnish) or Korsholm (Swedish) remains in use as the designation for the surrounding rural municipality, which has encircled the city since 1973.

During the period of Russian rule, the city was renamed Nikolaistad (Swedish) or Nikolainkaupunki (Finnish) in 1855, in tribute to the recently deceased Tsar Nicholas I of Russia. The renaming was prompted by a petition submitted to Tsar Alexander II in April of that year by a group of local merchants under pressure from authorities. The new name was unpopular among the residents who continued to refer to the city as Vasa. In 1862, an attempt to restore the original name through another petition to the emperor proved unsuccessful.

Following the Russian Revolution in 1917, the City Council decided on 19 March 1917 to revert back to the earlier name Vaasa. The name was confirmed by the Senate on 18 October 1917.

=== Foundation ===
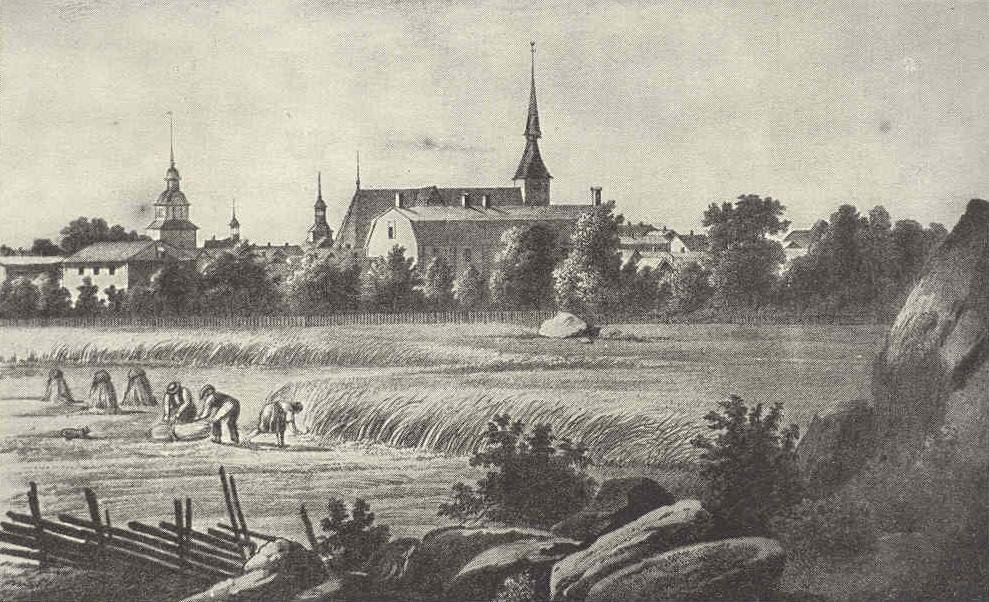
Old Vaasa in the 1840s by Johan Knutson

The history of Korsholm and also of Vaasa begins in the 14th century, when seafarers from the coastal region in central Sweden disembarked at the present Old Vaasa, and the wasteland owners from Southwest Finland came to guard their land.

In the middle of the century, Saint Mary's Church was built, and in the 1370s the building of the fortress at Korsholm, Crysseborgh, was undertaken, and served as an administrative centre of the Vasa County. King Charles IX of Sweden founded the town of Mustasaari (Mussor) on 2 October 1606, around the oldest harbour and trade point around the Korsholm church approximately seven kilometres (4.3 miles) to the southeast from the present city. In 1611, the town was chartered and renamed after the Royal House of Vasa.

Thanks to the sea connections, ship building and trade, especially tar trade, Vaasa flourished in the 17th century and most of the inhabitants earned their living from it.

In 1683, the three-subject or Trivial school moved from Nykarleby to Vaasa, and four years later a new schoolhouse was built in Vaasa. The first library in Finland was founded in Vaasa in 1794. In 1793, Vaasa had 2,178 inhabitants, and in the year of the catastrophic town fire of 1852 the number had risen to 3,200.

=== Finnish War ===
During the Finnish War, fought between Sweden and Russia in 1808–1809, Vaasa suffered more than any other city. In June 1808, Vaasa was occupied by the Russian forces, and some of the local officials pledged allegiance to the occupying force.

On 25 June 1808 the Swedish colonel Johan Bergenstråhle was sent with 1,500 troops and four cannons to free Vaasa from the 1,700 Russian troops who were led by generalmajor Nikolay Demidov. The Battle of Vaasa started with the Swedish force disembarking north of Vaasa in Österhankmo and advancing all the way to the city where they attacked with 1,100 troops, as some had to be left behind to secure the flank. There was heavy fighting in the streets and in the end the Swedish forces were repelled and forced to retreat back the way they came.

Generalmajor Demidov suspected that the inhabitants of Vaasa had taken to arms and helped the Swedish forces, even though the provincial governor had confiscated all weapons that spring, and he took revenge by letting his men plunder the city for several days. During those days 17 civilians were killed, property was looted and destroyed, many were assaulted and several people were taken to the village of Salmi in Kuortane where they had to endure the physical punishment called running the gauntlet. The massacre in Vaasa was exceptional during the Finnish war as the Russian forces had avoided that kind of cruelty that far. It was probably a result of the frustration the Russians felt because of intensive guerilla activity against them in the region.

On 30 June the Russian forces withdrew from Vaasa, and all officials that had pledged allegiance to Russia were discharged, and some were assaulted by locals. On 13 September the Russian forces returned and on the next day the decisive Battle of Oravais, which was won by Russia, was fought some 50 kilometres (30 mi) further north. By winter 1808, the Russian forces had overrun all of Finland, and in the Treaty of Fredrikshamn (17 September 1809) Sweden lost the whole eastern part of its realm. Vaasa would now become a part of the newly formed Grand Duchy of Finland within the Russian Empire.

=== Town fire ===
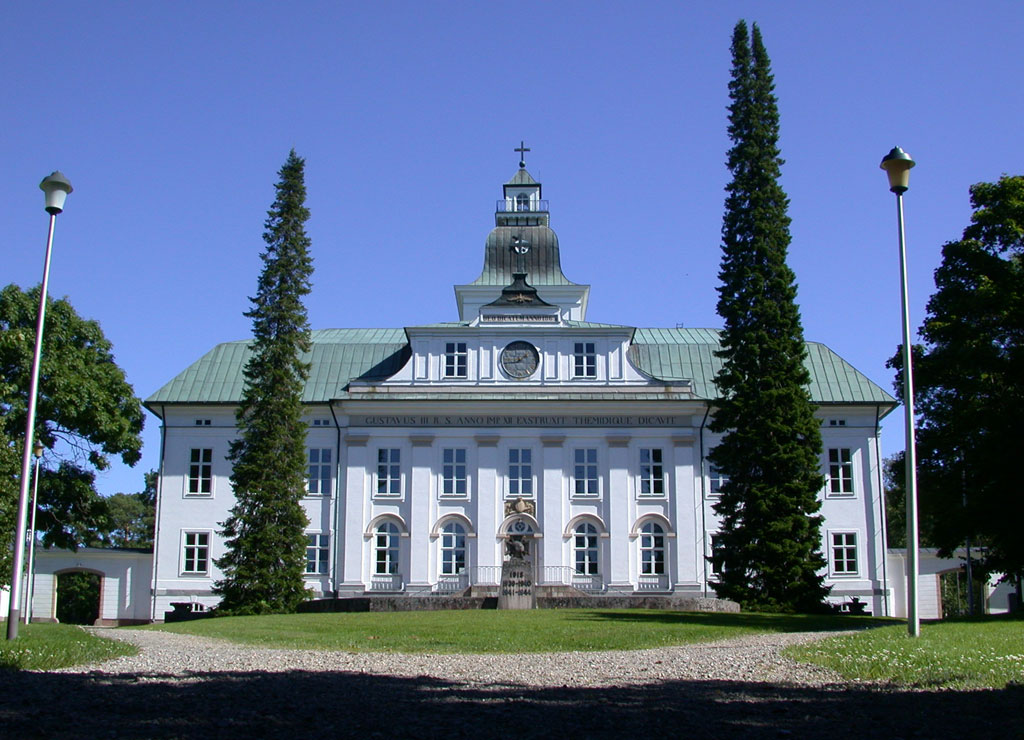
The Court of Appeal, nowadays the Church of Korsholm, survived the fire of 1852

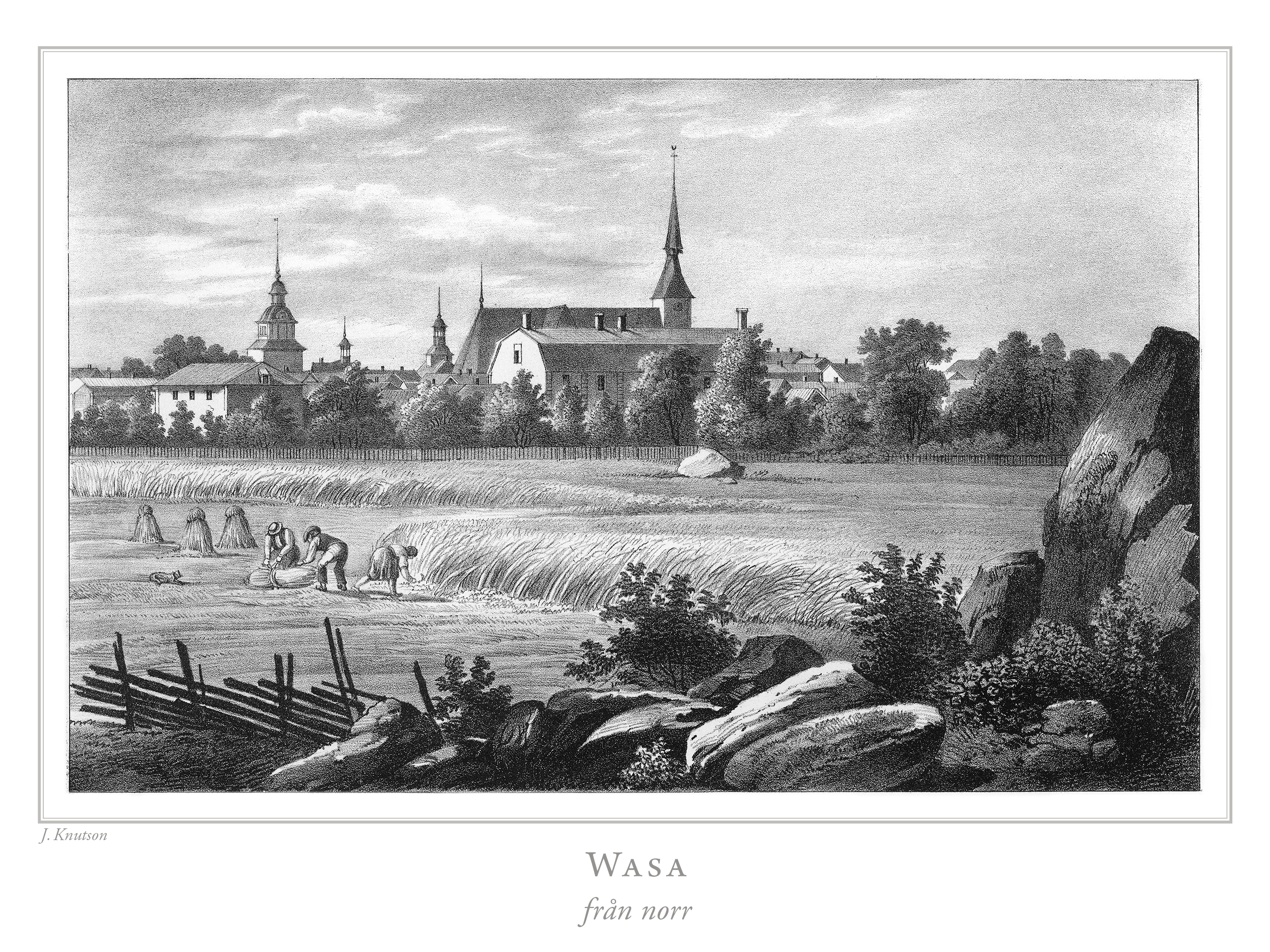
Illustration in Finland framstäldt i teckningar edited by Zacharias Topelius and published 1845–1852.

The mainly wooden and densely built town was almost utterly destroyed in 1852. A fire started in a barn belonging to district court judge J. F. Aurén on the morning of 3 August. At noon the whole town was ablaze and the fire lasted for many hours. By evening, most of the town had burned to the ground. Out of 379 buildings only 24 privately owned buildings had survived, among them the Falander–Wasastjerna patrician house (built in 1780–1781) which now houses the Old Vaasa Museum.

The Court of Appeal (built in 1775, nowadays the Church of Korsholm), some Russian guard-houses along with a gunpowder storage and the buildings of the Vaasa provincial hospital (nowadays a psychiatric hospital) also survived the blaze. The ruins of the greystone church, the belfry, the town hall and the trivial school can still be found in their original places. Much of the archived material concerning Vaasa and its inhabitants was destroyed in the fire. According to popular belief, the fire got started when a careless visitor from Vörå fell asleep in Aurén's barn and dropped his pipe in the dry hay.

=== New town ===
The new town of Nikolaistad (Finnish: Nikolainkaupunki), named after the late Tsar Nicholas I, rose in 1862 about seven kilometres (4.3 miles) to the northwest from the old town. The town's coastal location offered good conditions for seafaring. The town plan was planned by Carl Axel Setterberg in the Empire style. In the master plan the disastrous consequences of the fire were considered. Main streets in the new town were five broad avenues which divided the town into sections. Each block was divided by alleys.

The town was promptly renamed Vasa (Vaasa) after the Tsar Nicholas II was overthrown in 1917.

=== De facto Capital of Finland ===
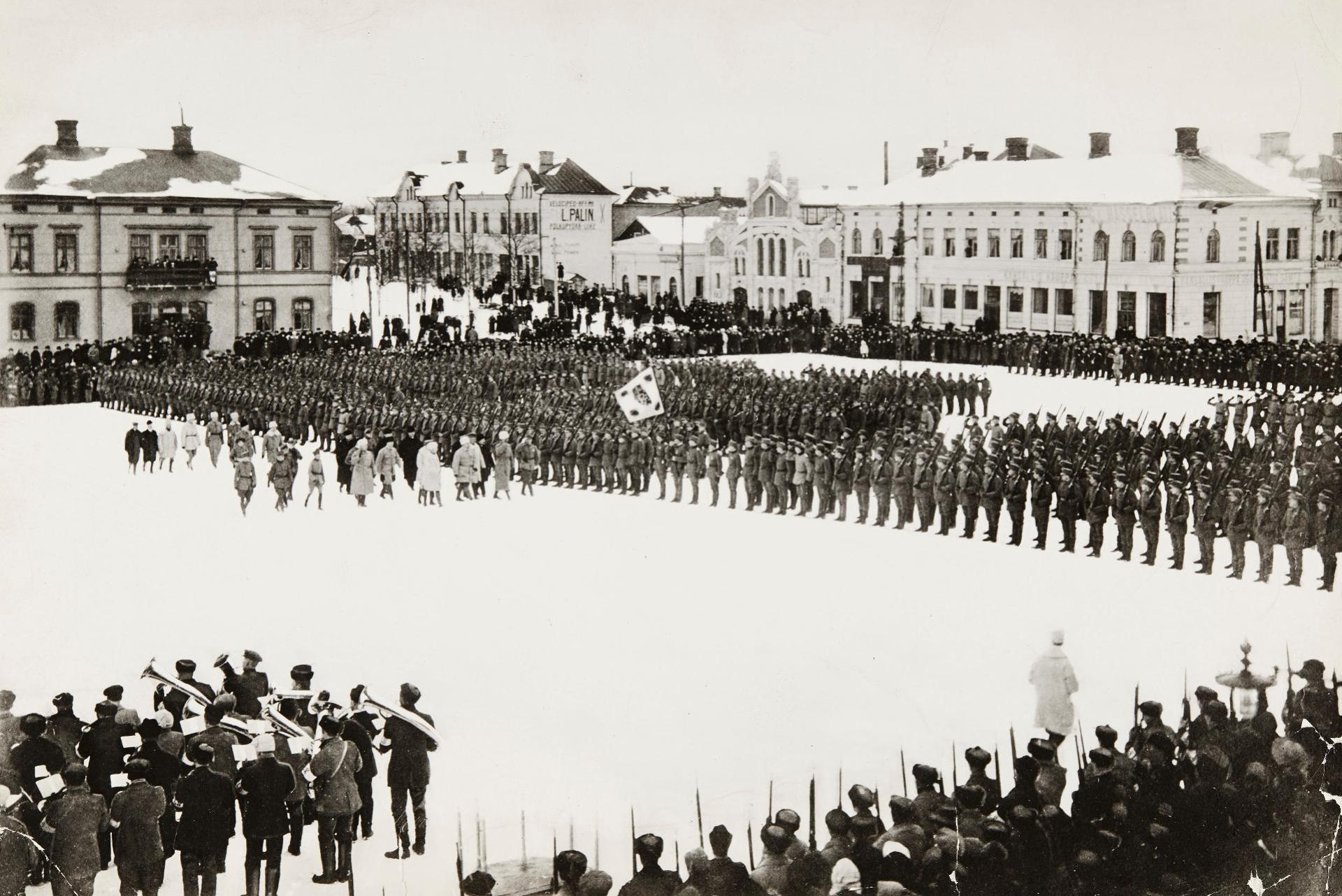
The Jaeger Battalion on the city square of Vaasa in February 1918. The forces are being inspected by General Mannerheim.

During the Finnish Civil War, Vaasa was the de facto capital of the Whites from 29 January to 3 May 1918. As a consequence of the occupation of central places and arresting of politicians in Helsinki the Senate decided to move the senators to Vaasa, where the White Guards that supported the Senate had a strong position and the contacts to the West were good.

The Senate of Finland began its work in Vaasa on 1 February 1918, and it had four members. The Senate held its sessions in the Town Hall. To express its gratitude to the town the Senate gave Vaasa the right to add the Cross of Freedom, independent Finland's oldest mark of honour designed by Akseli Gallen-Kallela, to its coat of arms, to the town's coat of arms. The coat of arms is unusual not only in this respect, but also because of its non-standard shape and a crown are included. Because of its role in the civil war, Vaasa became known as "The White City". A Statue of Freedom, depicting a victorious White soldier, was erected in the town square.

=== Post-war ===
The language conditions in the city shifted in the 1930s, and the majority became Finnish-speaking.

Post-war, Vaasa was industrialized, led by the electronics manufacturer Strömberg, later merged into ABB.

In 2013, the municipality of Vähäkyrö was merged into Vaasa. It is currently an exclave area of the city, since it is surrounded by other municipalities.

== Climate ==
Near the Polar Circle, Vaasa falls in continental subarctic climate (Köppen: Dfc) with severe dry winters and almost warm summers. The prevailing direction of the winds, North Atlantic Current and the proximity of the Gulf of Bothnia give the climate a certainly livability in spite of the latitude, similar to the south of Alaska, where continentality, proximity to the poles and moderation intersect. The Föhn wind, for example, passes over the Scandinavian Mountains and leaves a milder and drier weather in the lee of the mountains where Vaasa is found, affecting especially in the winter which explains sunny days even in the season of short solar duration.

The location of some sea distance gives a seasonal delay of spring and summer at the same time that autumn and winter are affected late. The average annual temperature is 4.7 °C (normal from 1991 to 2020). The low Ostrobothnia usually receives little snow but the contact of cold air with warmer and humid air can generate heavy snowfall. Early summer (as well as spring) tends to be drier and the wettest month does not coincide with the warmer month. End of April is usually the growing season with 250–300 mm approximately. The maritime breeze explains the difference in temperature, distribution of precipitation and sunshine, different from the Gulf of Finland, the Gulf of Bothnia brings the sea wind in places further distant about 50 km from the coast. The city gets more sun than inland places, although current log are unavailable. The highest ever recorded temperature was 32.2 °C (89.6 °F), on 18 July 2018, although a record of 33.7 °C (92.7 °F) was recorded in the city center the same day, which in fact was the hottest day of Finland in 2018 by slightly edging a temperature recorded in Turku Artukainen of 33.6 °C (92.5 °F), also on 18 July 2018, making it the highest temperature ever recorded in Vaasa.

Climate data for Vaasa Airport, 1991–2020 temps, 1981-2010 sunshine and precipitation, extremes 1961 – present from the airport and Klemettilä
| Month | Jan | Feb | Mar | Apr | May | Jun | Jul | Aug | Sep | Oct | Nov | Dec | Year |
|---|---|---|---|---|---|---|---|---|---|---|---|---|---|
| Record high °C (°F) | 8.9 (48.0) | 8.6 (47.5) | 14.5 (58.1) | 22.5 (72.5) | 28.7 (83.7) | 32.0 (89.6) | 33.7 (92.7) | 32.0 (89.6) | 27.7 (81.9) | 19.0 (66.2) | 13.2 (55.8) | 8.8 (47.8) | 33.7 (92.7) |
| Mean daily maximum °C (°F) | −2.0 (28.4) | −2.2 (28.0) | 1.4 (34.5) | 7.3 (45.1) | 13.6 (56.5) | 18.2 (64.8) | 21.1 (70.0) | 19.6 (67.3) | 14.4 (57.9) | 7.5 (45.5) | 2.3 (36.1) | −0.3 (31.5) | 8.4 (47.1) |
| Daily mean °C (°F) | −5.0 (23.0) | −5.8 (21.6) | −2.5 (27.5) | 2.9 (37.2) | 8.7 (47.7) | 13.6 (56.5) | 16.5 (61.7) | 15.1 (59.2) | 10.3 (50.5) | 4.6 (40.3) | 0.3 (32.5) | −2.9 (26.8) | 4.6 (40.4) |
| Mean daily minimum °C (°F) | −8.4 (16.9) | −9.1 (15.6) | −6.3 (20.7) | −1.2 (29.8) | 3.6 (38.5) | 8.7 (47.7) | 12.0 (53.6) | 10.8 (51.4) | 6.4 (43.5) | 1.8 (35.2) | −2.3 (27.9) | −6.1 (21.0) | 0.8 (33.5) |
| Record low °C (°F) | −36.2 (−33.2) | −38.6 (−37.5) | −30.6 (−23.1) | −18.1 (−0.6) | −7.6 (18.3) | −2.4 (27.7) | 0.5 (32.9) | −0.5 (31.1) | −6.0 (21.2) | −20.4 (−4.7) | −27.9 (−18.2) | −34.4 (−29.9) | −38.6 (−37.5) |
| Average precipitation mm (inches) | 34.0 (1.34) | 20.0 (0.79) | 27.0 (1.06) | 27.0 (1.06) | 31.0 (1.22) | 43.0 (1.69) | 60.0 (2.36) | 63.0 (2.48) | 62.0 (2.44) | 54.0 (2.13) | 50.0 (1.97) | 41.0 (1.61) | 512 (20.15) |
| Average precipitation days (≥ 1.0 mm) | 8.0 | 6.0 | 7.0 | 6.0 | 7.0 | 6.0 | 9.0 | 10.0 | 11.0 | 10.0 | 11.0 | 9.0 | 100 |
| Mean monthly sunshine hours | 29.1 | 71.9 | 131.1 | 190.2 | 277.5 | 303.0 | 282.8 | 220.0 | 131.5 | 84.6 | 39.8 | 20.9 | 1,782.4 |
Source 1: FMI
Source 2: FMI open data

== Demographics ==
=== Population ===
Historical population
| Year | Pop. | ±% p.a. |
|---|---|---|
| 1815 | 2,602 | — |
| 1850 | 3,665 | +0.98% |
| 1870 | 4,578 | +1.12% |
| 1890 | 10,297 | +4.14% |
| 1910 | 21,819 | +3.83% |
| 1920 | 23,957 | +0.94% |
| 1930 | 26,101 | +0.86% |
| 1939 | 33,218 | +2.72% |
| 1972 | 54,472 | +1.51% |
| 1980 | 58,335 | +0.86% |
| 1990 | 58,394 | +0.01% |
| 2000 | 61,470 | +0.51% |
| 2010 | 64,345 | +0.46% |
| 2020 | 67,551 | +0.49% |
Source: Tilastollinen päätoimisto, Statistics Finland (1972-2020)

The city of Vaasa has 71,209 inhabitants, making it the 14th most populous municipality in Finland. The Vaasa region has a population of 112,096.

Population size 1990–2025
| Year | Population |
|---|---|
| 1990 | 58,394 |
| 1995 | 60,399 |
| 2000 | 61,470 |
| 2005 | 61,889 |
| 2010 | 64,345 |
| 2015 | 67,619 |
| 2020 | 67,551 |
| 2025 | 71,209 |

=== Languages ===
Population by
mother tongue (2025)
1. Finnish (62.2%)
2. Swedish (22.8%)
3. Ukrainian (1.50%)
4. Arabic (1.10%)
5. English (1.00%)
6. Russian (0.90%)
7. Bengali (0.80%)
8. Other (9.70%)

The city of Vaasa is officially bilingual, with both Finnish and Swedish as official languages. The majority of the population, 44,305 persons (62.2%), spoke Finnish as their first language. The number of Swedish speakers was 16,258 persons (22.8%) of the population. Foreign languages were spoken by 14.9% of the population. As English and Swedish - or Finnish for Swedish speakers - are compulsory school subjects, functional bilingualism or trilingualism acquired through language studies is not uncommon.

At least 50 different languages are spoken in Vaasa. The most common foreign languages are Ukrainian (1.5%), Arabic (1.1%), English (1.0%) and Russian (0.9%).

=== Immigration ===
Population by country of birth (2025)
| Country of birth | Population | % |
| Finland | 60,429 | 84.9 |
| Soviet Union | 822 | 1.2 |
| Sweden | 798 | 1.1 |
| Ukraine | 600 | 0.8 |
| Bangladesh | 521 | 0.7 |
| India | 460 | 0.6 |
| Vietnam | 432 | 0.6 |
| Nepal | 388 | 0.5 |
| Sri Lanka | 387 | 0.5 |
| Philippines | 380 | 0.5 |
| Other | 6,992 | 9.8 |

As of 2024, there were 9,967 persons with a foreign background living in Vaasa, or 14% of the population. (Note: Statistics Finland classifies a person as having a "foreign background" if both parents or the only known parent were born abroad.) The number of residents who were born abroad was 9,875, or 14% of the population. The number of persons with foreign citizenship living in Vaasa was 7,179. Most foreign-born citizens came from the Sweden, former Soviet Union, Ukraine, Bangladesh and Vietnam.

The relative share of immigrants in Vaasa's population is above the national average. Moreover, the city's new residents are increasingly of foreign origin. This will increase the proportion of foreign residents in the coming years.

=== Religion ===
In 2023, the Evangelical Lutheran Church was the largest religious group with 65.0% of the population of Vaasa. Other religious groups accounted for 2.4% of the population. 32.6% of the population had no religious affiliation.

== Economy ==
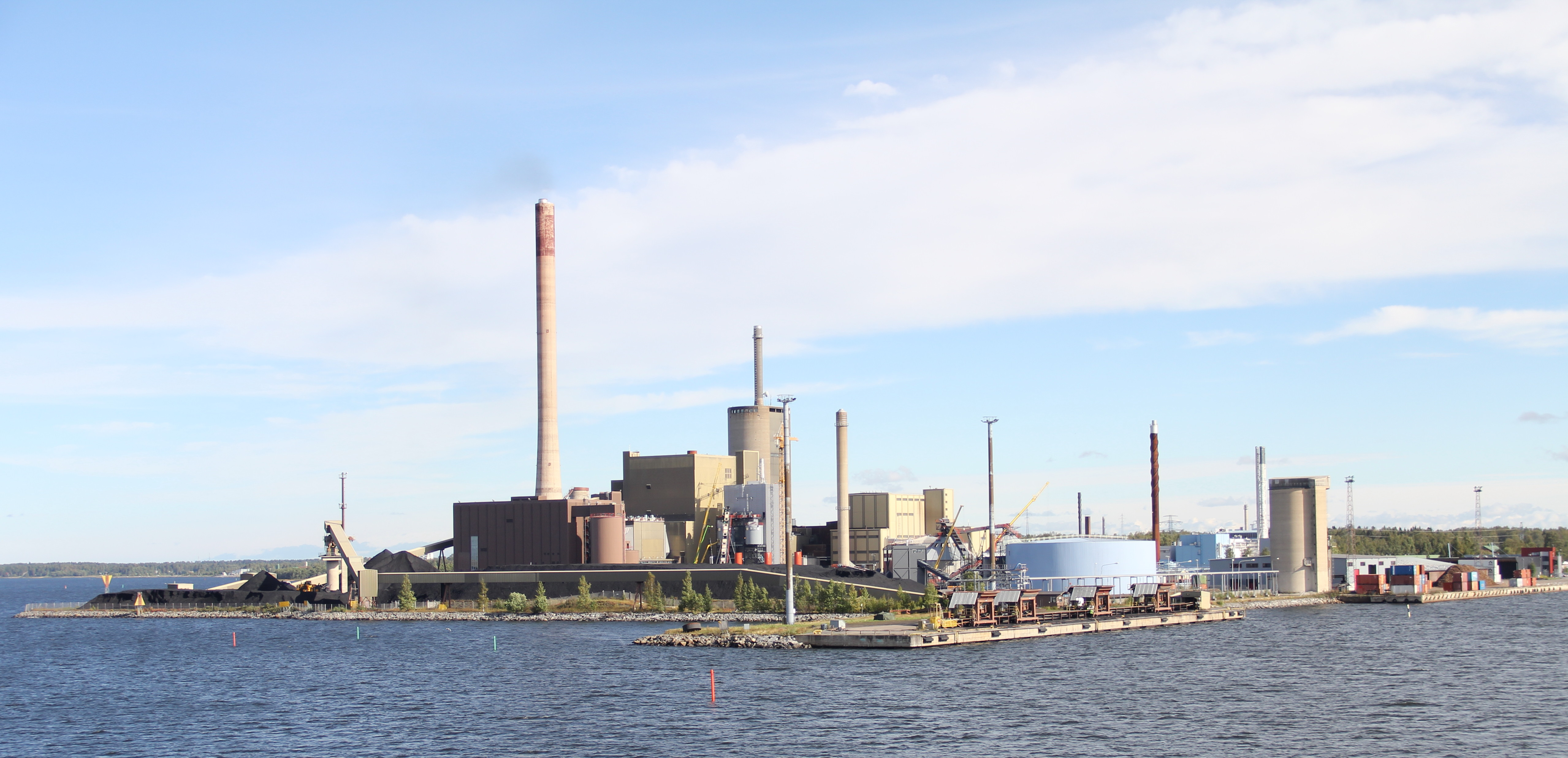
The Vaskiluoto power stations in Vaskiluoto, Vaasa

There is a university (University of Vaasa), faculties of Åbo Akademi and Hanken, and two universities of applied sciences in the town. Many workers commute from Korsholm, Laihia, and other municipalities nearby.

The Vaskiluoto power stations complex is situated on the island of Vaskiluoto, supplying electricity to the national grid as well as district heat to the city.

The multi-use cargo and passenger Port of Vaasa is located in Vaskiluoto, connecting Vaasa with Umeå, Sweden, and destinations further afield.

The film production company Future Film has its head office in Vaasa.

Vaasa is also home to Tropiclandia Water Park, located on Vaskiluoto Island adjacent to a local spa hotel. The now disassembled Wasalandia Amusement Park, which ceased operations in 2015 due to a small number of visitors, was located in the immediate vicinity of Tropiclandia.

== Transport ==
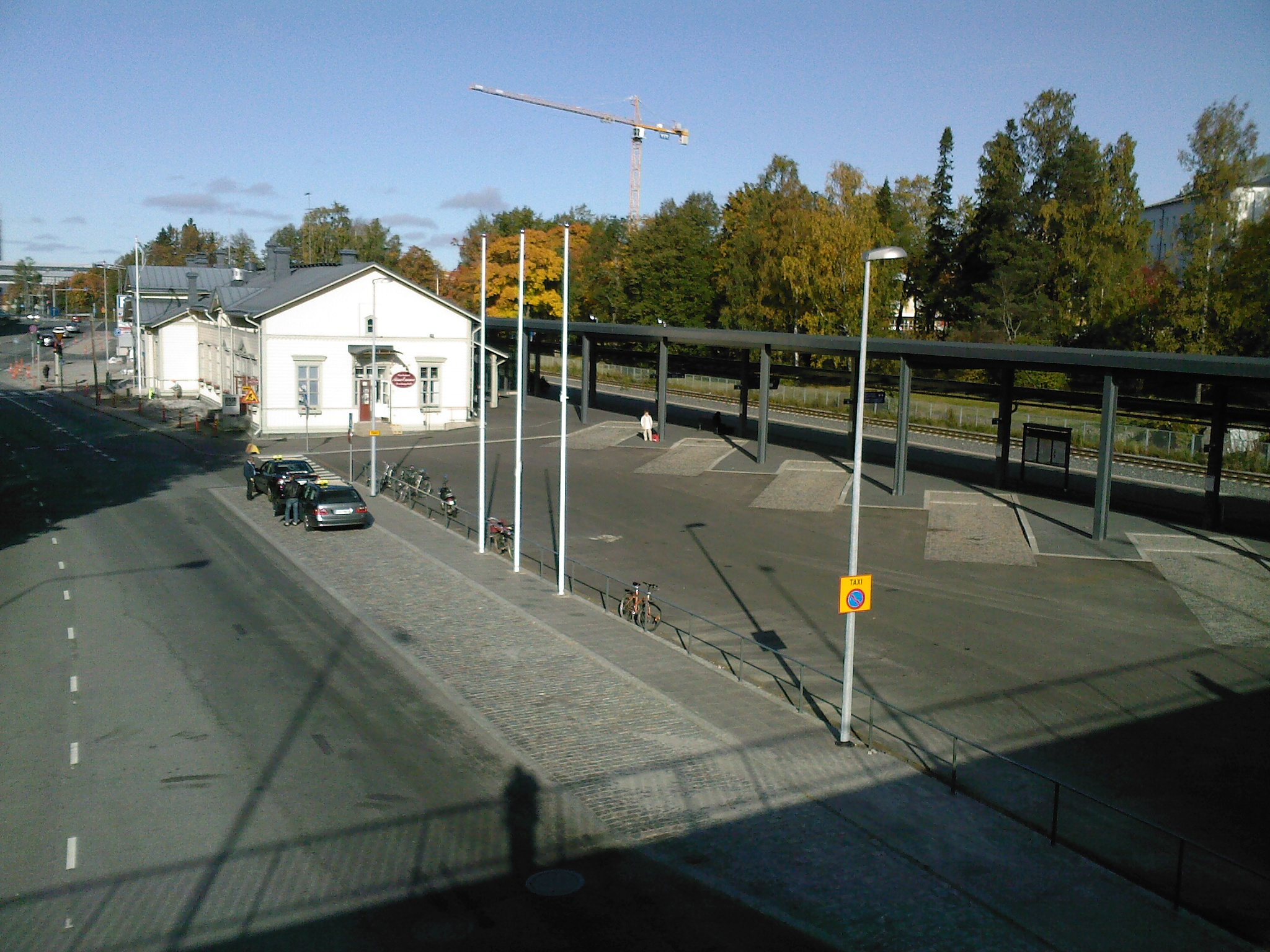
Vaasa railway station

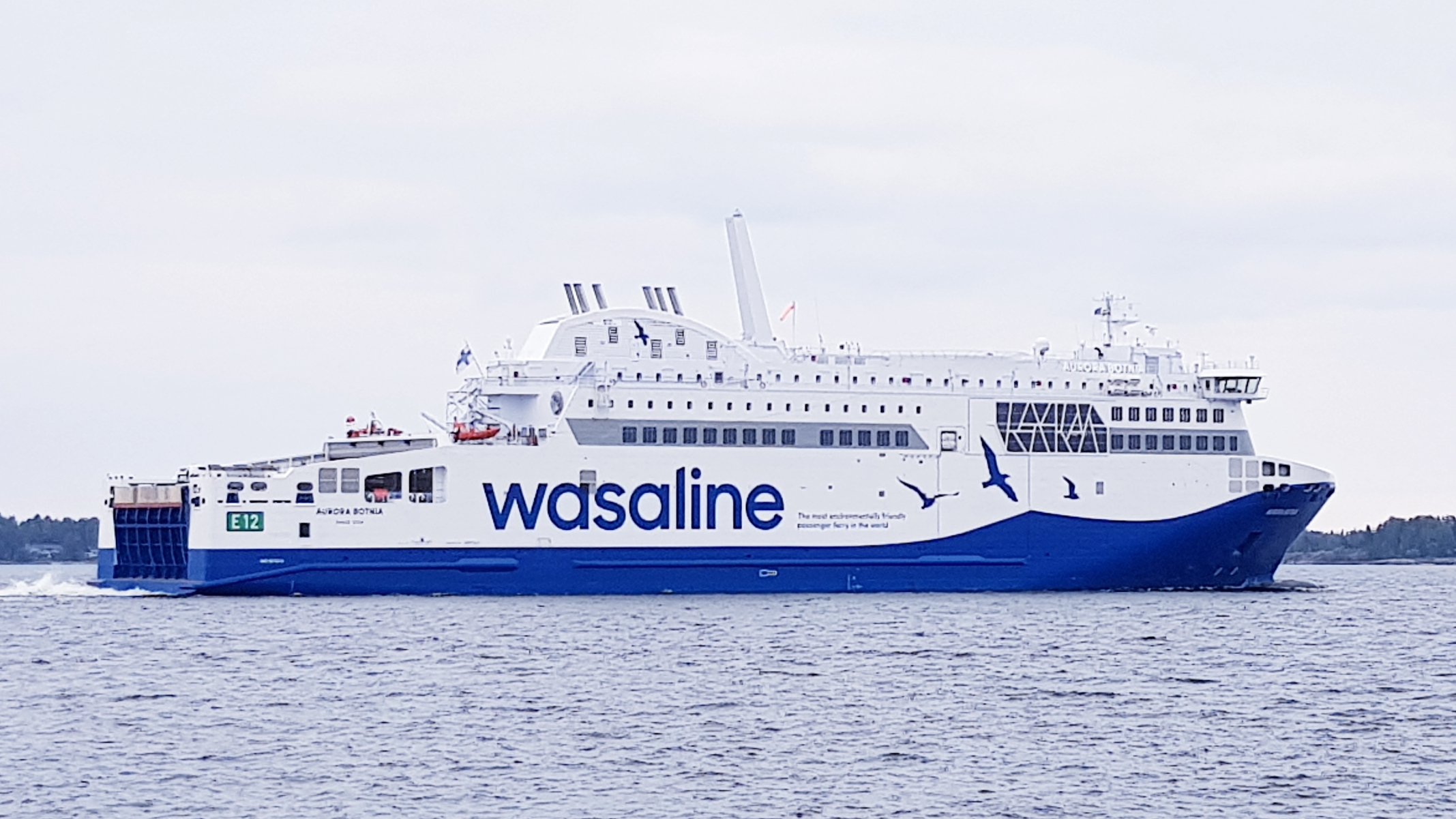
Aurora Botnia ferry which operating on Wasaline

Main roads, including highway 3 (E12) and highway 8 (E8), connect Vaasa to Helsinki, Tampere, Oulu, Pori, Jyväskylä, Kokkola and Seinäjoki. There are 419 kilometres (260 mi) from Helsinki to Vaasa, 330 kilometres (210 mi) from Turku, 244 kilometres (152 mi) from Tampere, 319 kilometres (198 mi) from Oulu, 121 kilometres (75 mi) from Kokkola, 99 kilometres (62 mi) from Jakobstad, 193 kilometres (120 mi) from Pori, 83 kilometres (52 mi) from Lapua and 78 kilometres (48 mi) from Seinäjoki. It is also a relatively short distance from Sweden to Vaasa. The tourist route called Blue Highway also runs from the port of Vaasa and through the city. In 1962–1964, other Finnish cities introduced regional speed limits of 50 km/h, but in Vaasa the limit was 60 km/h for a long time.

Vaasa Airport is located about nine kilometers southeast of the city center. Finnair and Scandinavian Airlines operate from Vaasa Airport, but Norwegian Air Shuttle terminated the Vaasa–Helsinki route on 10 January 2020. There is scheduled traffic from Vaasa Airport to Helsinki (flight time 45 min) and Stockholm (flight time 1 h 5 min).

Port of Vaasa is located on the Vaskiluoto island four kilometers west of the city centre. Daily passenger and cargo traffic between Vaasa and Umeå is operated by shipping company Wasaline.

== Culture ==
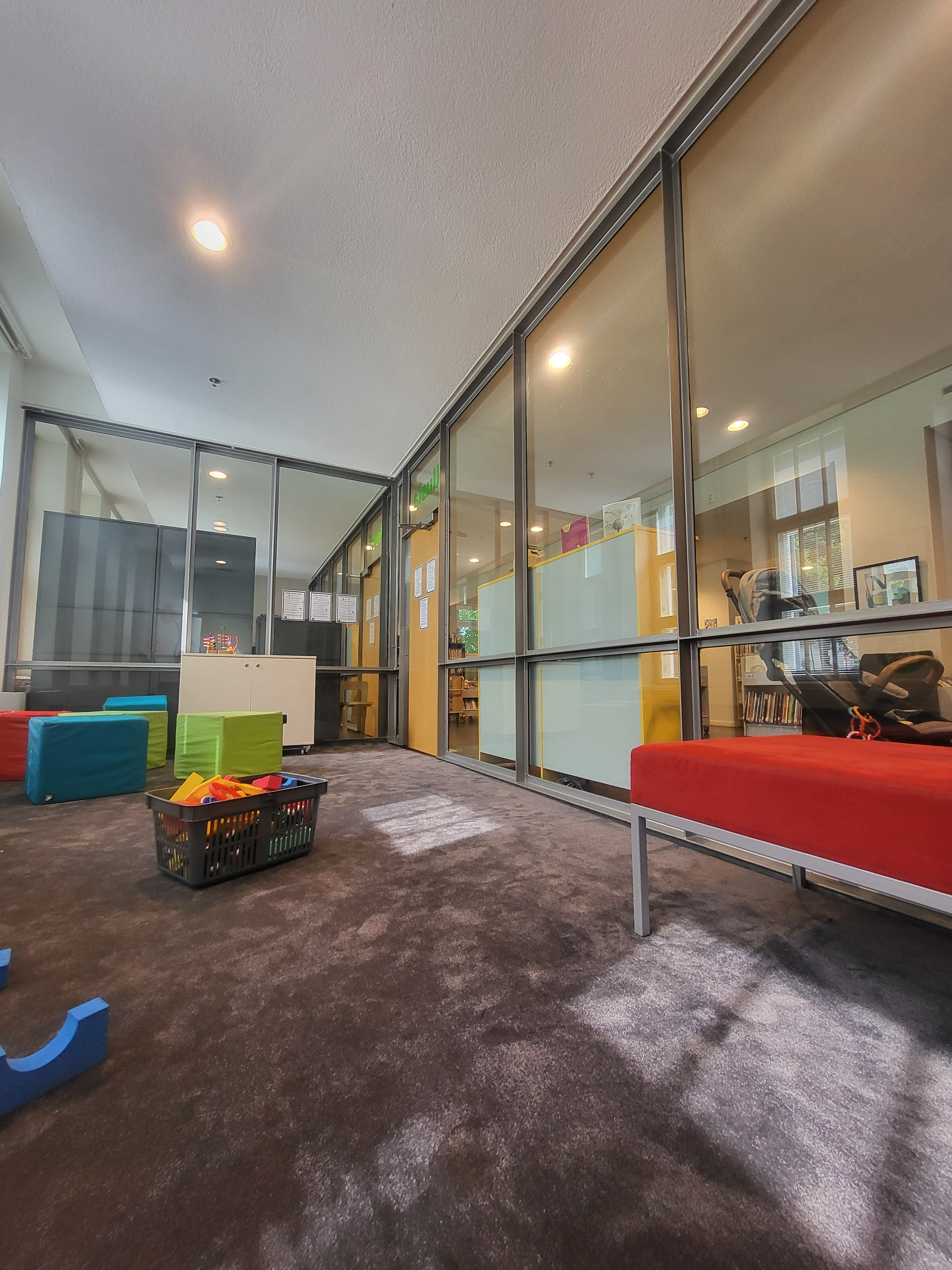
A play room in Vaasa main library

- Ostrobothnian Museum
- Kuntsi Museum of Modern Art
- Vaasa Car & Motor Museum

=== Other sights ===
- The Statue of Liberty (Suomen Vapaudenpatsas)
- Söderfjärden

=== Sport ===
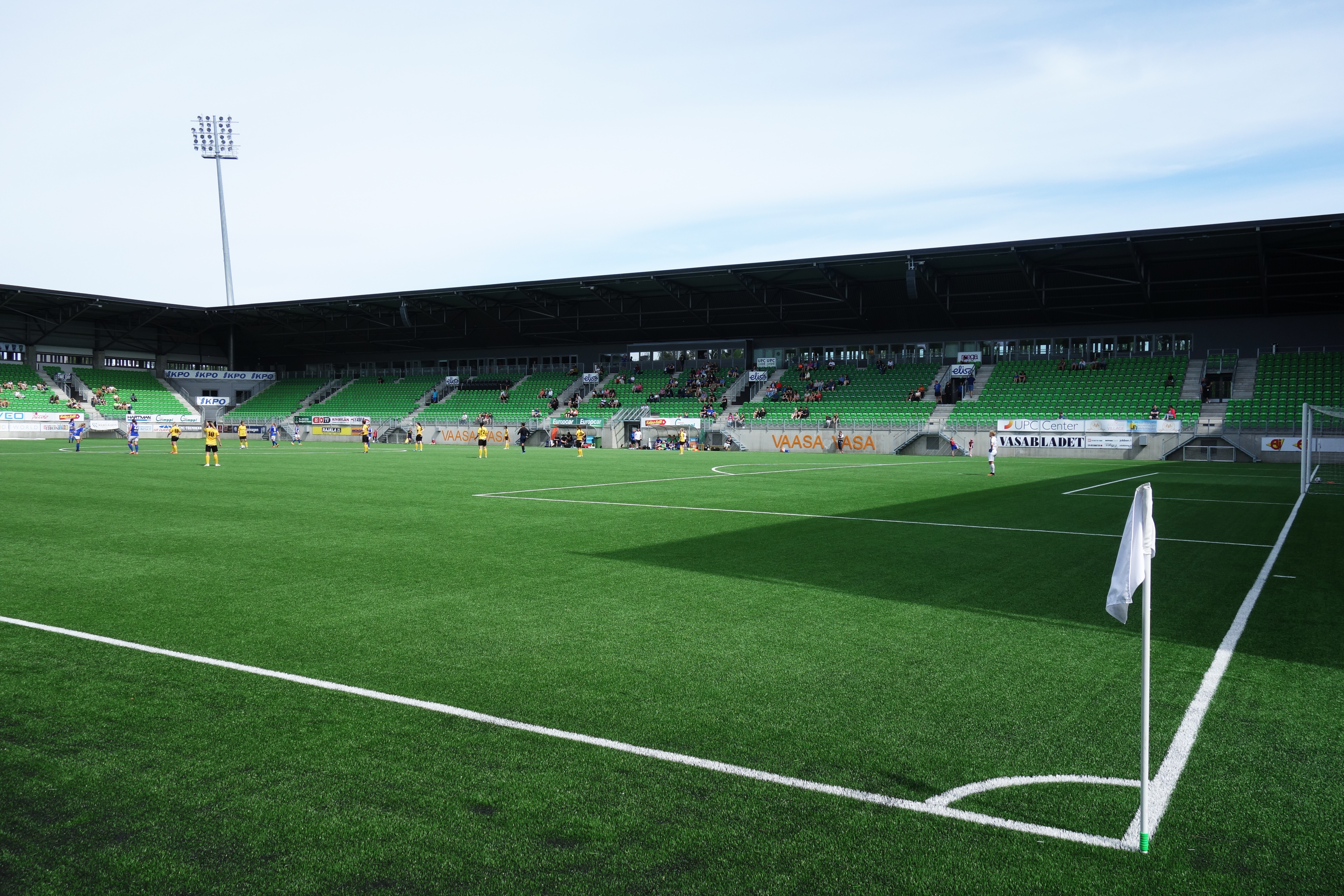
Hietalahti Stadium

- Vaasan Sport, men's ice hockey team playing in the Liiga, home ice is Vaasan Sähkö Areena
- Vaasan Mailattaret, a women's Finnish baseball team playing in the Superpesis, home ground is Hietalahti Pesäpallo Stadium
- Vaasan Sport Naiset, women's ice hockey team playing in the Naisten Liiga, home ice is Vaasan Sähkö Areena
- Vaasan Palloseura, men's football club playing in the Veikkausliiga, home ground is Hietalahti Stadium
- Vasa IFK, men's football club playing in the Ykkönen, home ground is Hietalahti Stadium
- FC Kiisto, men's football club playing in the Kolmonen, home ground is Hietalahti Stadium
- Vaasa Rugby Club
  - Vaasa Wolves, inactive men's rugby union team, played in the Finnish Championship Rugby League until 2019
  - Vaasa Foxes, women's rugby sevens team playing in the Finnish Championship 7's Series

== Education ==
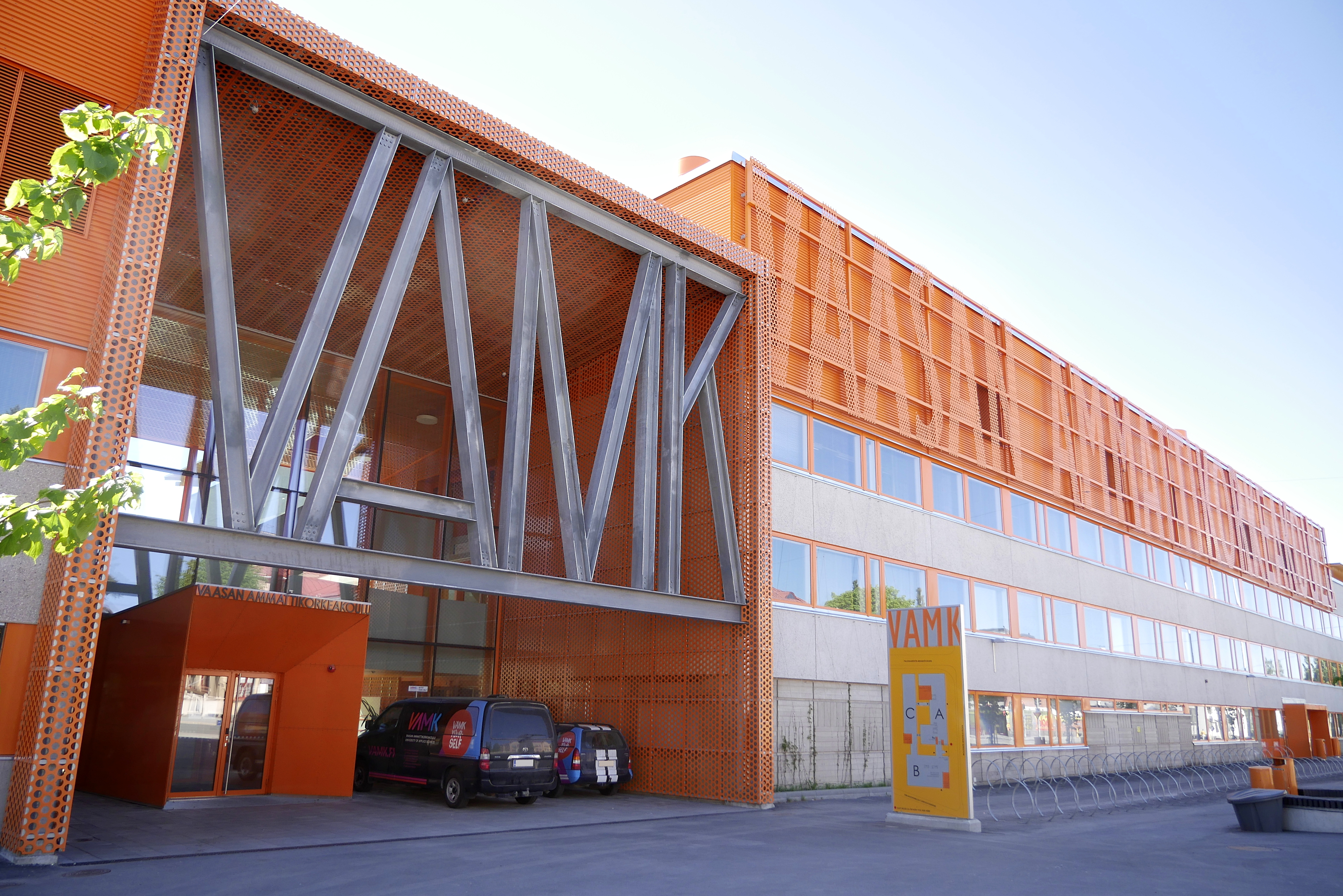
Vaasa University of Applied Sciences

Vaasa has three universities. The largest one is the University of Vaasa, which is located in the neighbourhood of Palosaari. Palosaari is a peninsula near the center of Vaasa, connected to it by bridges. The other two universities are Åbo Akademi, headquartered in Turku, and the Hanken School of Economics headquartered in Helsinki. Unique to Vaasa is the Finland-Swedish teachers training school Vasa övningsskola, part of Åbo Akademi. The University of Helsinki also has a small unit, specialized in law studies, in the city centre.

The city has two universities of applied sciences: Vaasa University of Applied Sciences (former Vaasa Polytechnic), located right next to the University of Vaasa, and Novia University of Applied Sciences (former Swedish University of Applied Sciences).

City has about 13,000 university students and about 4,000 vocational school students.

== Notable people ==
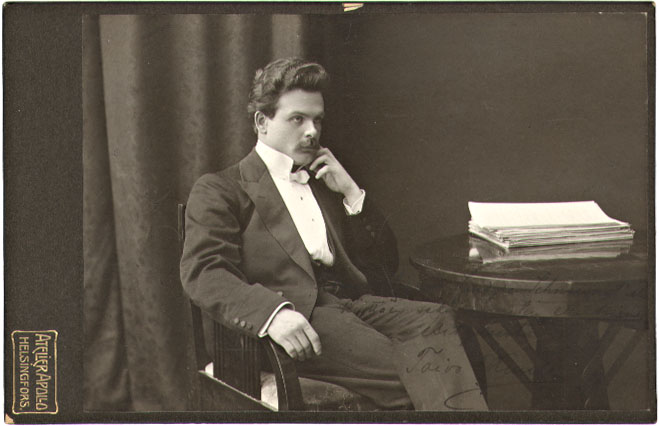
Toivo Kuula

- Monica Aspelund – Singer
- Fanny Churberg (1845–1892) – Painter
- Sebastian Da Costa – singer and rapper
- Seppo Evwaraye – American football player
- Rabbe Grönblom – Businessman
- Kai Hahto - Metal Drummer/drum teacher
- Nanny Hammarström (1870–1953) – Author
- Jarl Hemmer – Author
- Edvin Hevonkoski – Sculptor
- Mikaela Ingberg – Javelin thrower
- Fritz Jakobsson – Painter
- Vesa 'Vesku' Jokinen – Musician, the lead singer of Klamydia
- Mikael Jungner – MD of Yleisradio
- Samuli Kivimäki - ice hockey player
- Sari Krooks – Ice hockey player
- Heli Koivula-Kruger – Athlete
- Miika Koivisto – Ice hockey player
- Susanna 'Suski' Korvala – Singer
- Björn Kurtén – Paleontologist, author
- Joachim Kurtén – Businessman, politician
- Toivo Kuula – Composer
- August Alexander Levón – Industrialist, businessman
- Jani Liimatainen – Guitar player
- Matias Mäkynen – Politician
- Nandor Mikola – Painter
- Håkan Nyblom – Finnish wrestler
- Camilla Nylund – Opera singer
- Jorma Ojaharju – Author
- Oskar Osala – Ice hockey player
- Pekka Puska – Doctor, expert on public health, politician
- Viljo Revell – Architect, works included Toronto City Hall in Canada.
- Camilla Richardsson – Middle-distance runner
- Seppo Sanaksenaho – Mayor of Vaasa 1997–2001, Deputy Mayor 1979–1996
- Leif Segerstam – Musician, composer, conductor
- Carl Axel Setterberg – Architect, creator of the new Vaasa
- Pekka Strang – Actor
- Jani Toivola – Member of parliament, actor, television host (Finnish Idols 2007, The Voice TV)
- Onni Tommila – Actor (Big Game, Rare Exports: A Christmas Tale)
- Allu Tuppurainen – Actor, creator of Rölli
- Jenny Wilhelms – Musician
- Carl Gustaf Wolff – Businessman
- Mathilda Wrede – "Friend of the inmates"
- Yrjö Sakari Yrjö-Koskinen (Georg Zacharias Forsman) – Politician, professor, fennoman
- Jukka Seppo - Ice hockey player
- Lauri Tähkä - Singer/songwriter
- Vappu Taipale - Psychiatrist and politician
- Juha Tapio - Singer, lyricist, composer and guitarist
- Erik Adolf von Willebrand — physician who made major contributions to haematology

== Twin towns ==
As of 2006, Vaasa has town twinning treaties or treaties of cooperation signed with the following ten cities:

| City | Province | Country | Year |
|---|---|---|---|
| Malmö | Scania | Sweden | 1940^{1} |
| Umeå | Västerbotten | Sweden | 1940^{2} |
| Harstad | Troms | Norway | 1949^{2} |
| Helsingør | Capital Region of Denmark | Denmark | 1949^{2} |
| Pärnu | Pärnu County | Estonia | 1956^{2} |
| Schwerin | Mecklenburg-Vorpommern | Germany | 1965^{2} |
| Kiel | Schleswig-Holstein | Germany | 1967^{2} |
| Šumperk | Olomouc Region | Czech Republic | 1984^{2} |
| Morogoro | (Tanzania) Morogoro Region | Tanzania | 1988^{3} |
| Bellingham | Washington | United States | 2009^{4} |

^1Godfather Town
^2Twin Town
^3Cooperation Treaty
^4Sister City

== See also ==
- Wasa, British Columbia (named after Vasa)
- Blue Highway (an international tourist route)
- Seinäjoki (a neighboring city from the South Ostrobothnia region)
- Methodism in Finland
