= Vaskiluoto =

Island and major district in Vaasa, Finland

Coordinates: 63.091667°N 21.572222°E

Vaskiluoto Vasklot
- Subdivision
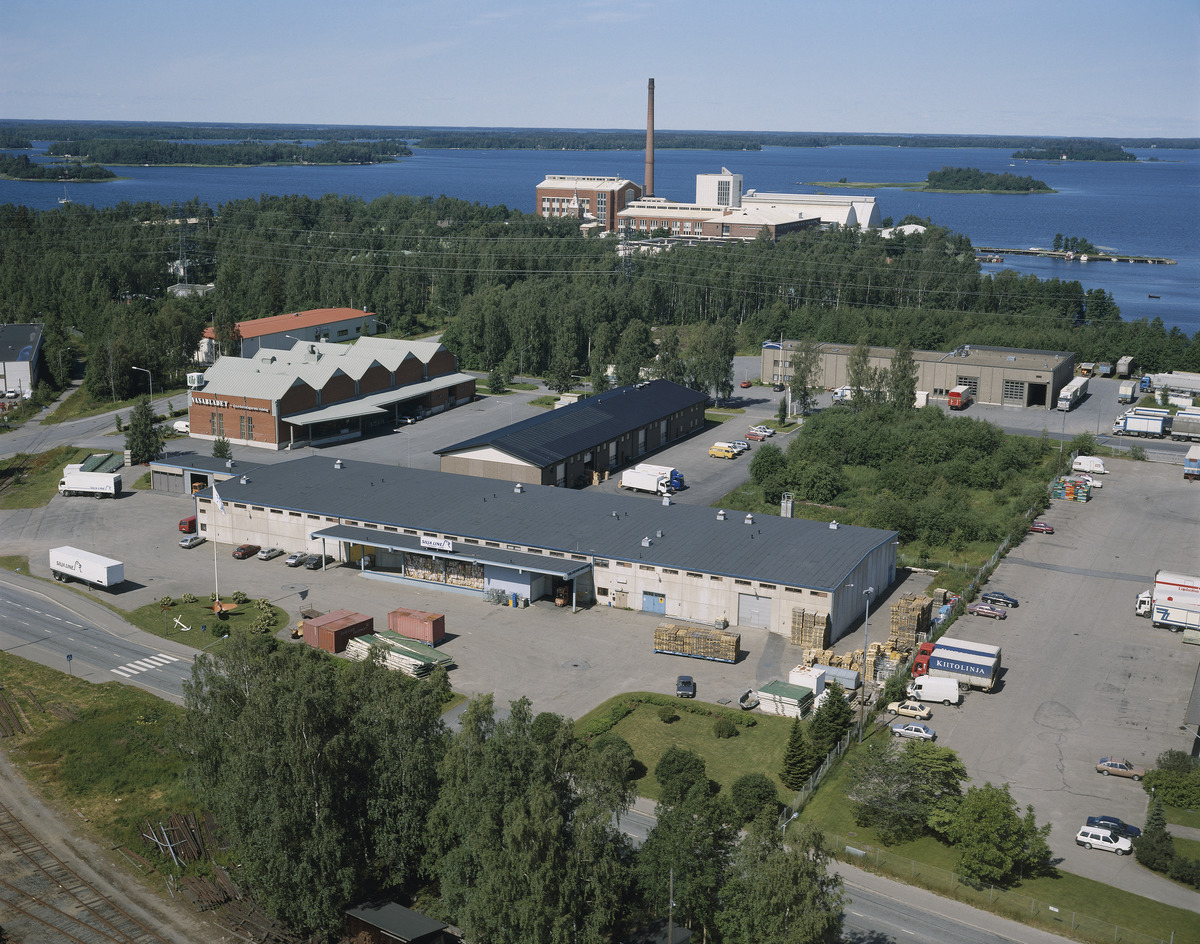
- Vaskiluoto in the 1990s.

- Vaskiluoto highlighted on the map of Vaasa.
- Interactive map of Vaskiluoto
- Country: Finland
- Region: Ostrobothnia
- Sub-region: Vaasa
- Municipality: Vaasa
- Subdivision regions: Satama, Sokeri, Niemeläntie
- Population (2024): 216 (Note: Combined population of Vaskiluoto regions.)
- Postal codes: 65170
- Major district number: 03

Vaskiluoto (Swedish: Vasklot) is a Finnish island in the Gulf of Bothnia, immediately in front of the city centre of Vaasa, Finland. It is connected to the mainland by the Vaskiluoto road and rail bridge, and has a surface area of 2.5 square kilometres (1 sq mi).

Vaskiluoto is also one of the 12 districts of the city of Vaasa, with a population of c. 390 residents and c. 900 jobs.

Facilities located on the island include the Port of Vaasa, with (among other things) a regular ferry service by Wasa Line to Umeå, Sweden, the Vaskiluoto power stations complex, as well as various leisure and tourist attractions. The mostly disused Vaskiluoto railway station is situated on the island, and continues to service the port terminal.

In Vaskiluoto, Tropiclandia Water Park is located right next to a local spa hotel. In the immediate vicinity of Tropiclandia was the now deserted Wasalandia Amusement Park, which ceased operations in 2015 due to a small number of visitors.
