= Korsholm Church =

Church in Vaasa, Finland

Coordinates: 63°04′14″N 21°43′54″E

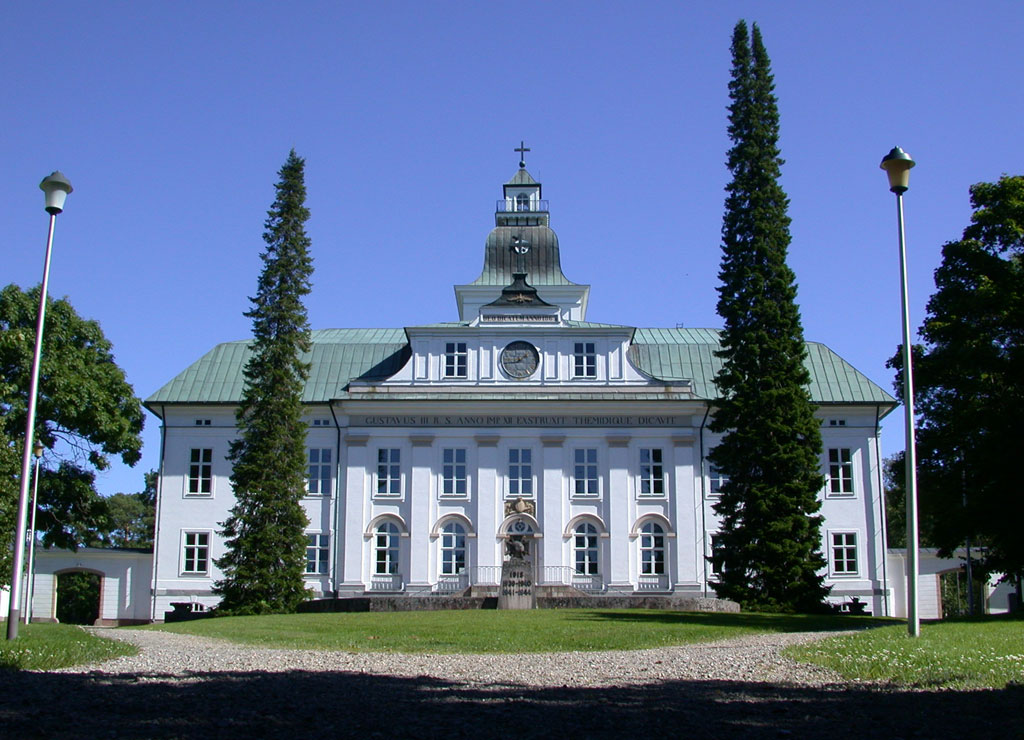
Korsholm Church

Korsholm Church (Swedish: Korsholms kyrka, Finnish: Mustasaaren kirkko) is a church building in the city of Vaasa, in the region of Ostrobothnia in Finland.

Originally the building was built for the Court of Appeal between 1776 and 1786, and designed by Carl Fredrik Adelcrantz. After the city, including the church, burnt down in 1852, the building was rebuilt as a church under the direction of Carl Axel Setterberg, who worked as a county architect for the county of Vasa. Much of the actual reconstruction on the inside of the building was designed and completed by Johan Lillros, a local builder, and a number of local carpenters. It was, at a time, home to a Finnish congregation.
