= Johan Knutson =

Swedish-born Finnish landscaper

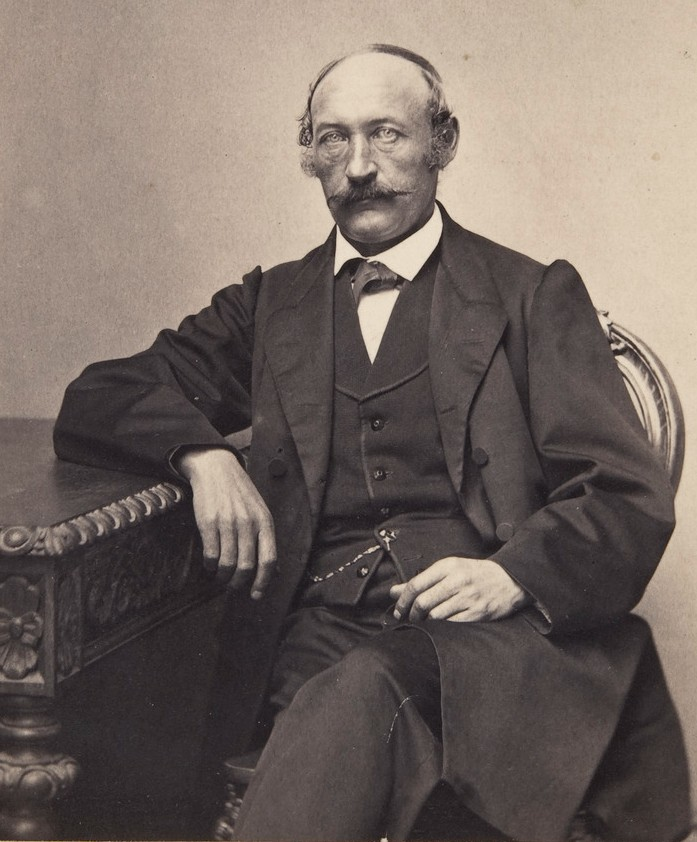
Johan Knutson (c.1890)

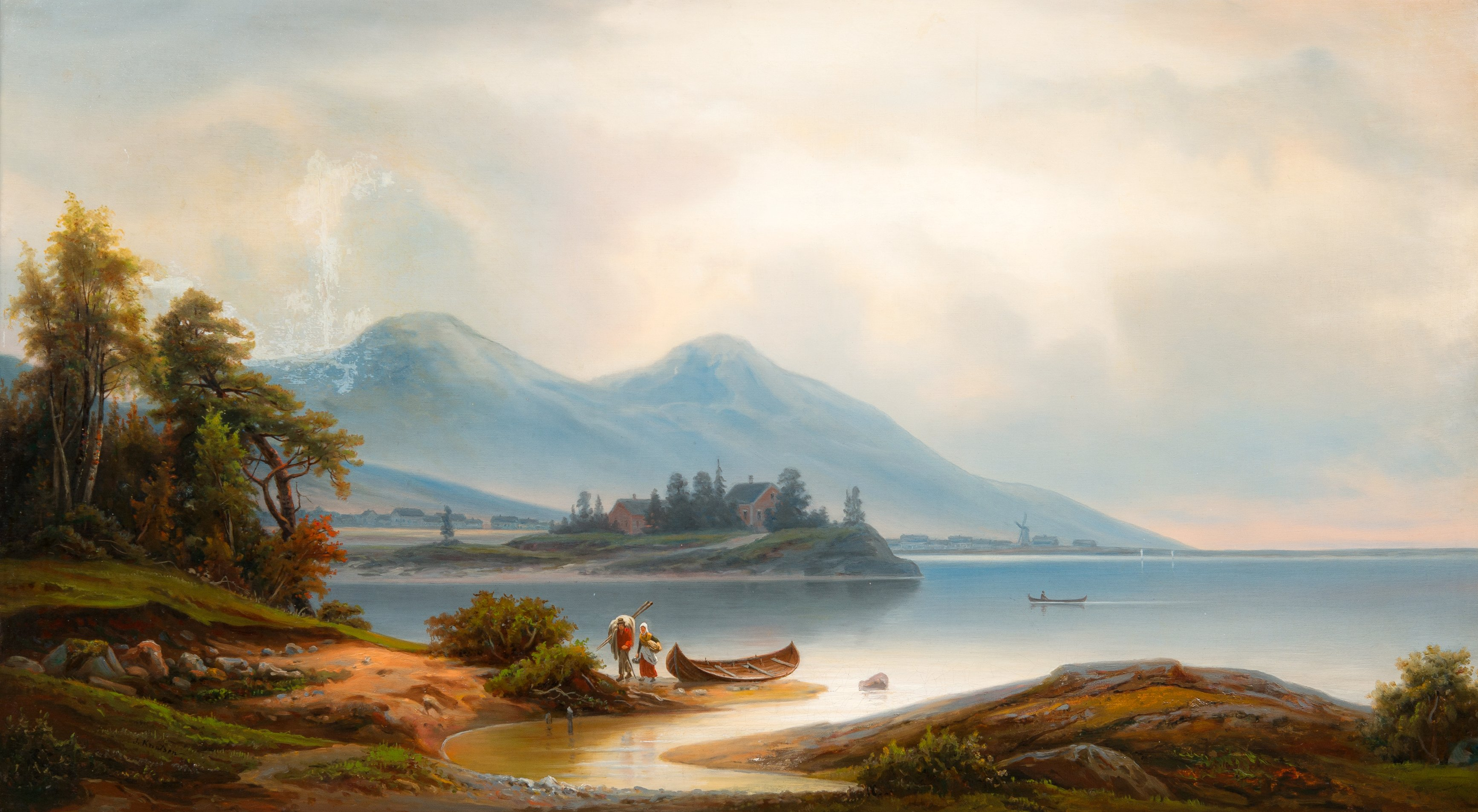
Returning Home

Johan Knutson (28 September 1816, Allerum - 13 September 1899, Helsinki) was a Swedish-born Finnish landscape painter.

== Life and work ==
He studied in Copenhagen in 1838, then in the lithography department at the Royal Swedish Academy of Fine Arts from 1839 to 1840. Upon graduating, at the age of twenty-four, he moved to Finland. There, he became a member of the Suomen Taiteilijaseura (Artists' Assoaciation) and taught drawing at a school in Porvoo from 1844 to 1890. There, he became a friend of Johan Ludvig Runeberg, and was influenced by his poetry.

In the early 1840s, he depicted street life in Helsinki in humorous graphic sheets, the continued publication of which was, however, banned by the Police Commissioner. From 1845 to 1852, he was involved in illustrating Finland framstäldt i teckningar (Finland Depicted in Drawings), with text by Zachris Topelius. He created a total of 48 landscape images for the book. His drawings were also included in several booklets, known collectively as En resa i Finland (Travelling in Finland); published from 1872 to 1874.

He had his first solo exhibit in 1858. He also participated in exhibitions in Sweden; notably the General Industrial Exposition of Stockholm (1866).

His works may be seen at the Turku Art Museum, Tampere Art Museum, Cygnaeus Gallery, Helsinki City Museum, Porvoo Town Hall and the National Museum of Finland.
