= En resa i Finland =

Book by Zacharias Topelius

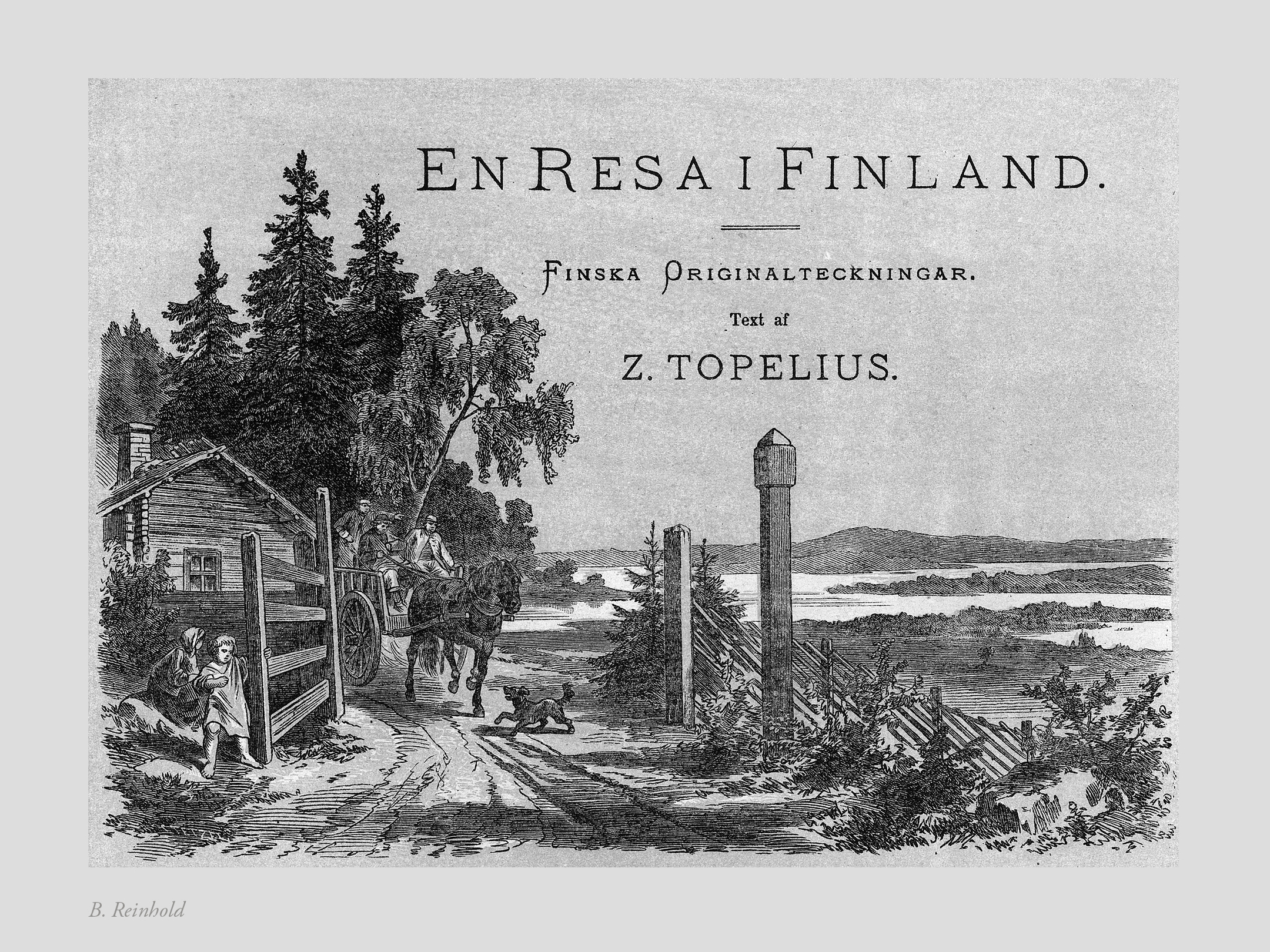
- Author: Zacharias Topelius
- Language: Swedish
- Publication date: 1872-1874, 2013
- Publication place: Finland
- Website: https://topelius.sls.fi/

En resa i Finland (A journey in Finland) is a book by Zacharias Topelius published in twelve volumes between 1872 and 1874, which describes Finland, its people and places. The work is illustrated with 36 steel engravings.

The motifs are primarily from the coastal regions of southern Finland as well as Tavastia, Karelia and Savonia. The intention was to publish additional booklets about the more northern parts of the country, but due to a low number of subscribers and unprofitability, no more series were published.

The Finnish translation by Julius Krohn was published at the same time under the title Matkustus Suomesa. The translations into German were published in 1874 and Russian in 1875.

The booklets were republished by the Society of Swedish Literature in Finland in 2013. Topelius's similar historical-geographical works include Finland framstäldt i teckningar (Finland presented in drawings, 1845–1852) and Boken om vårt land (The book about our country, 1875).

== Gallery ==
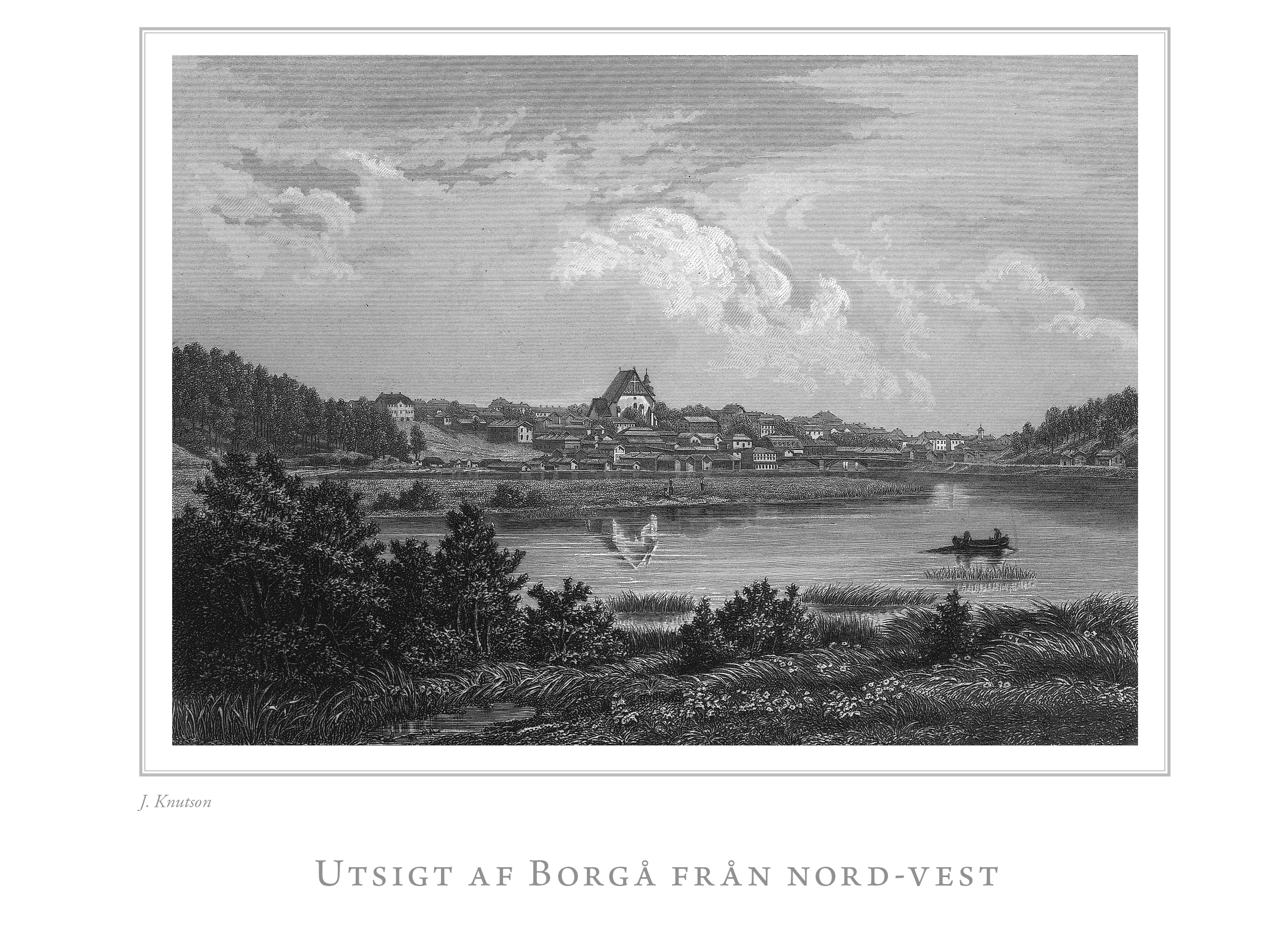
View of Porvoo, Uusimaa

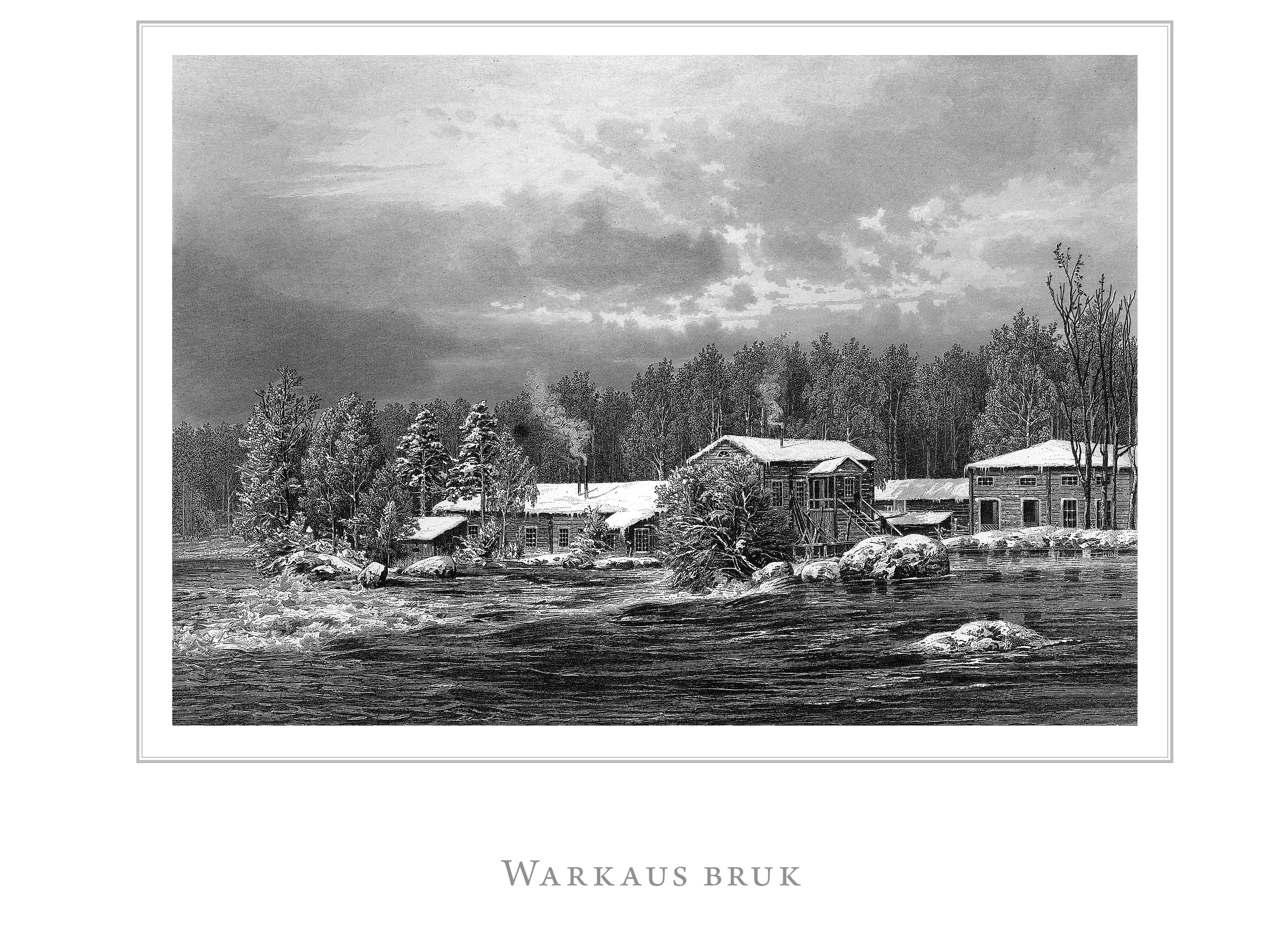
Varkaus bruk, Savonia

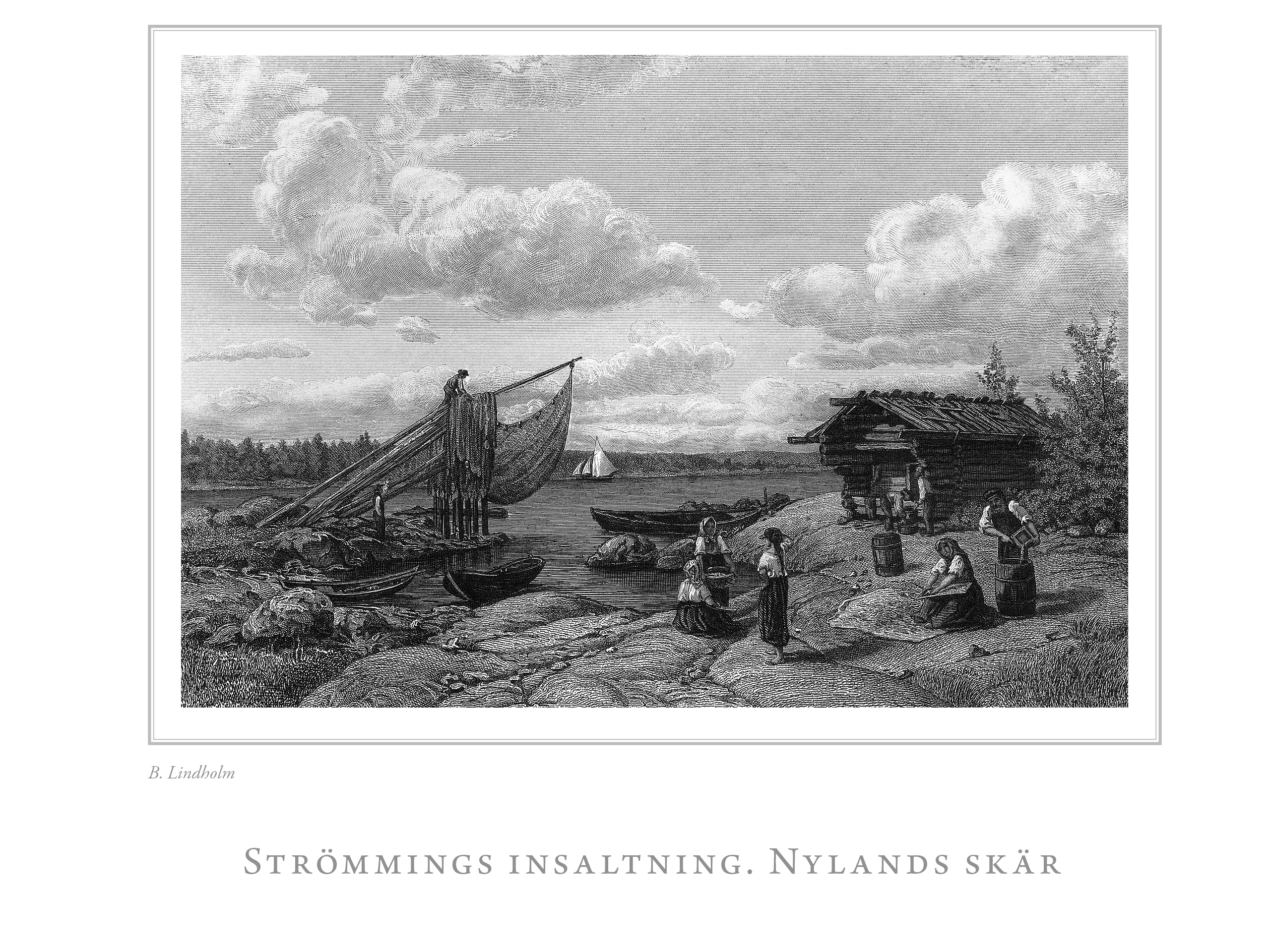
Salting herring in Uusimaa

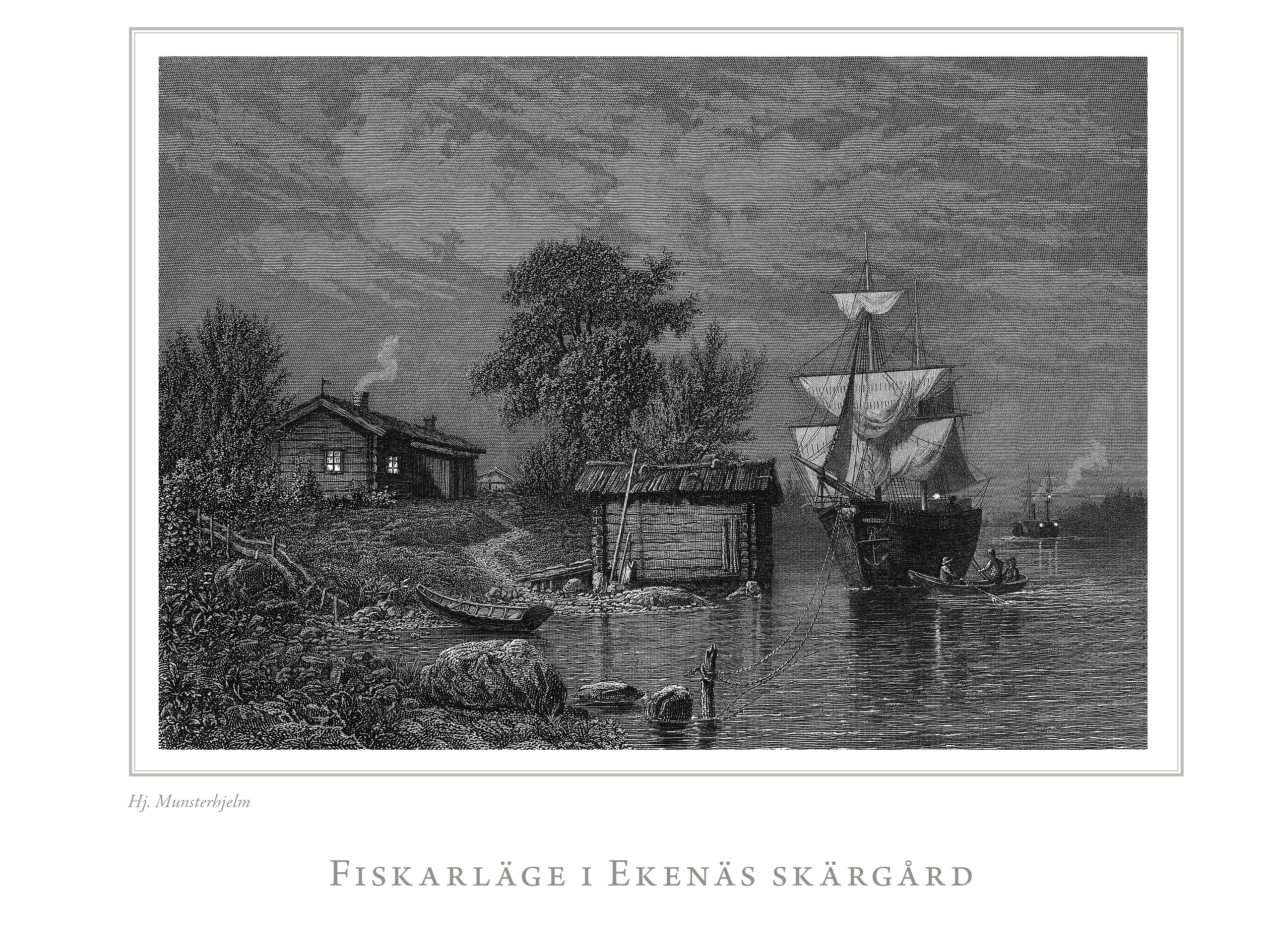
Fishing village in Ekenäs, Uusimaa

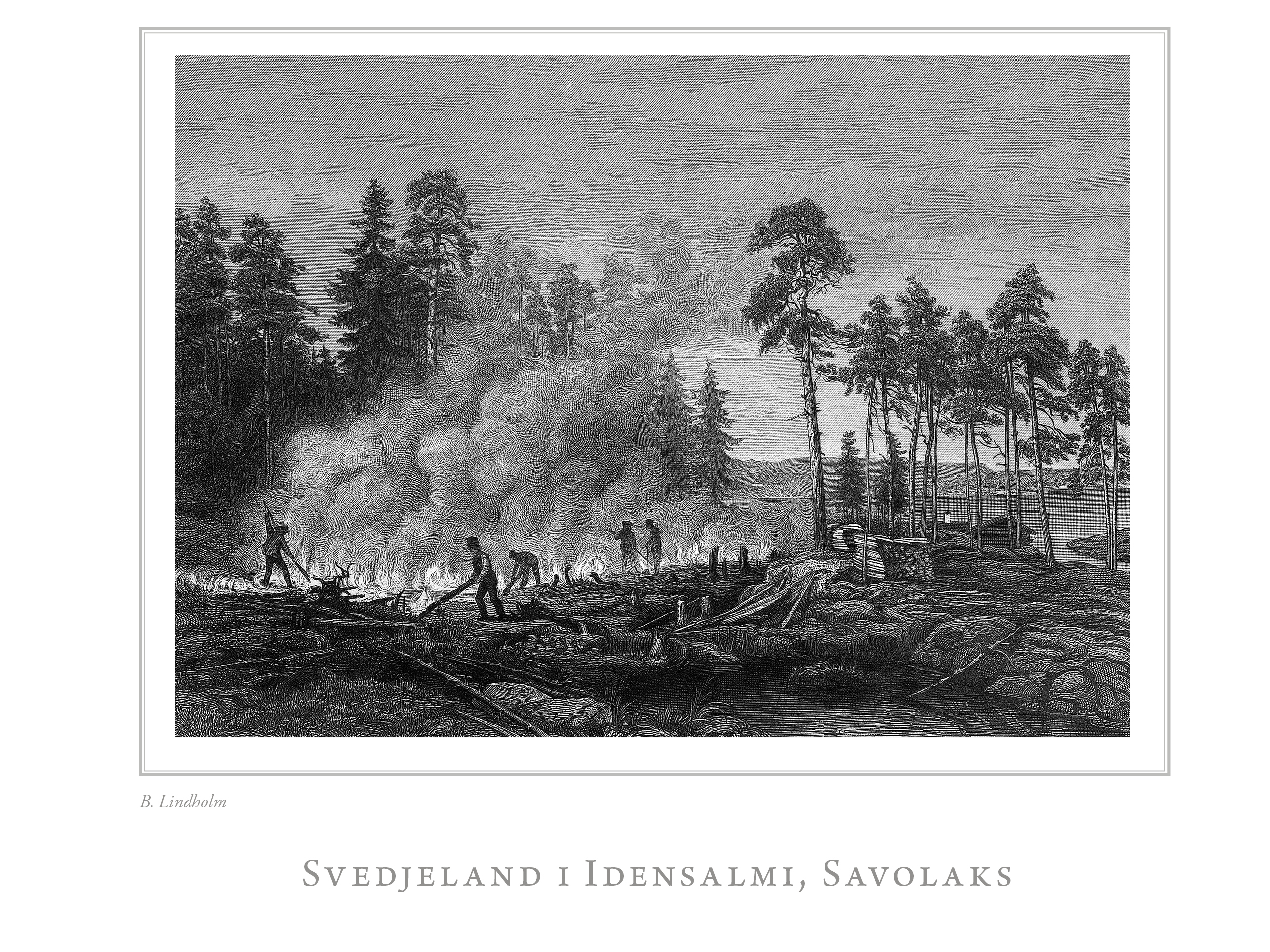
Slash and burn in Savonia

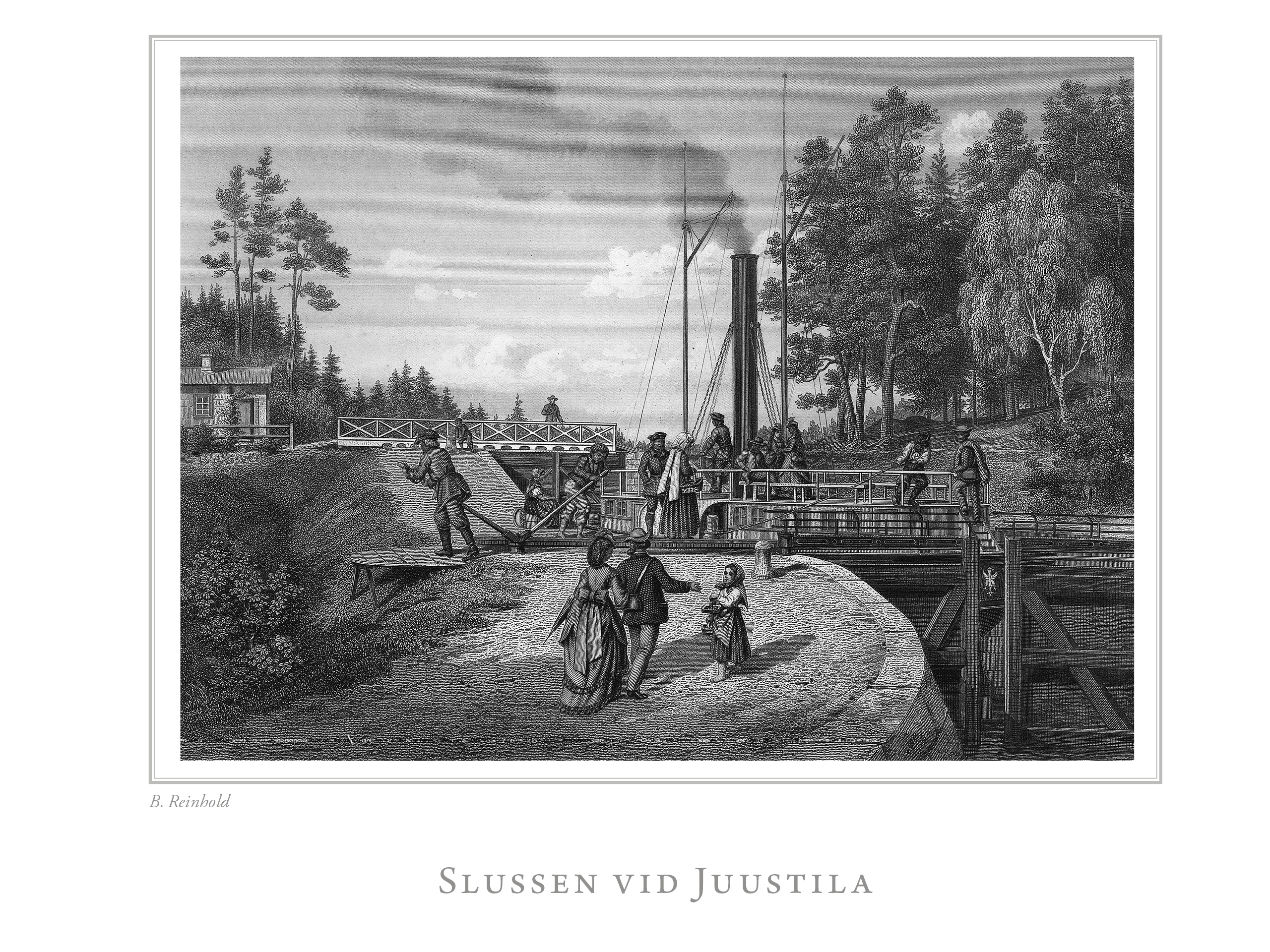
The lock at Juustila North of Vyborg in Karelia

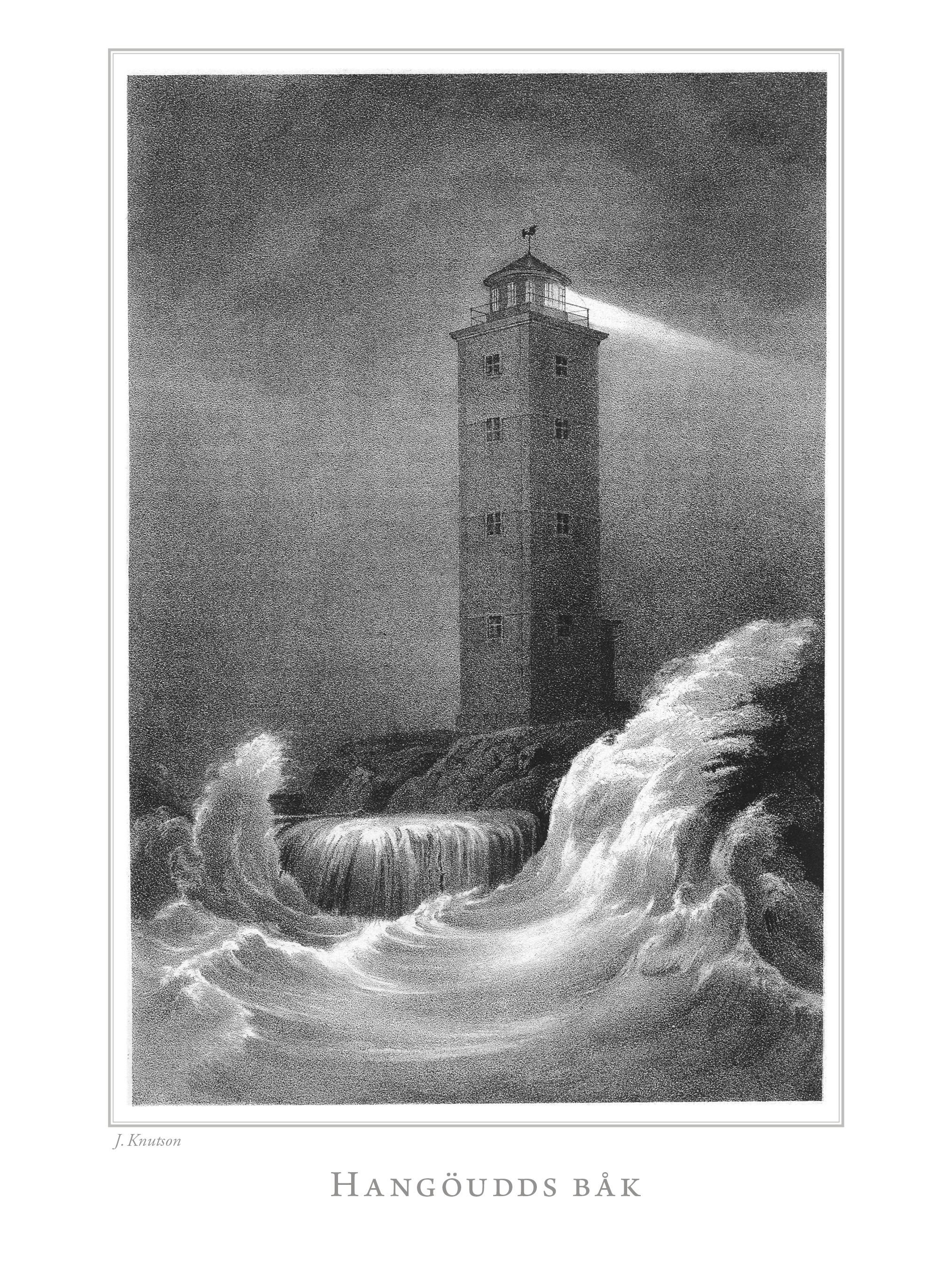
The lighthouse of Hangö, Uusimaa

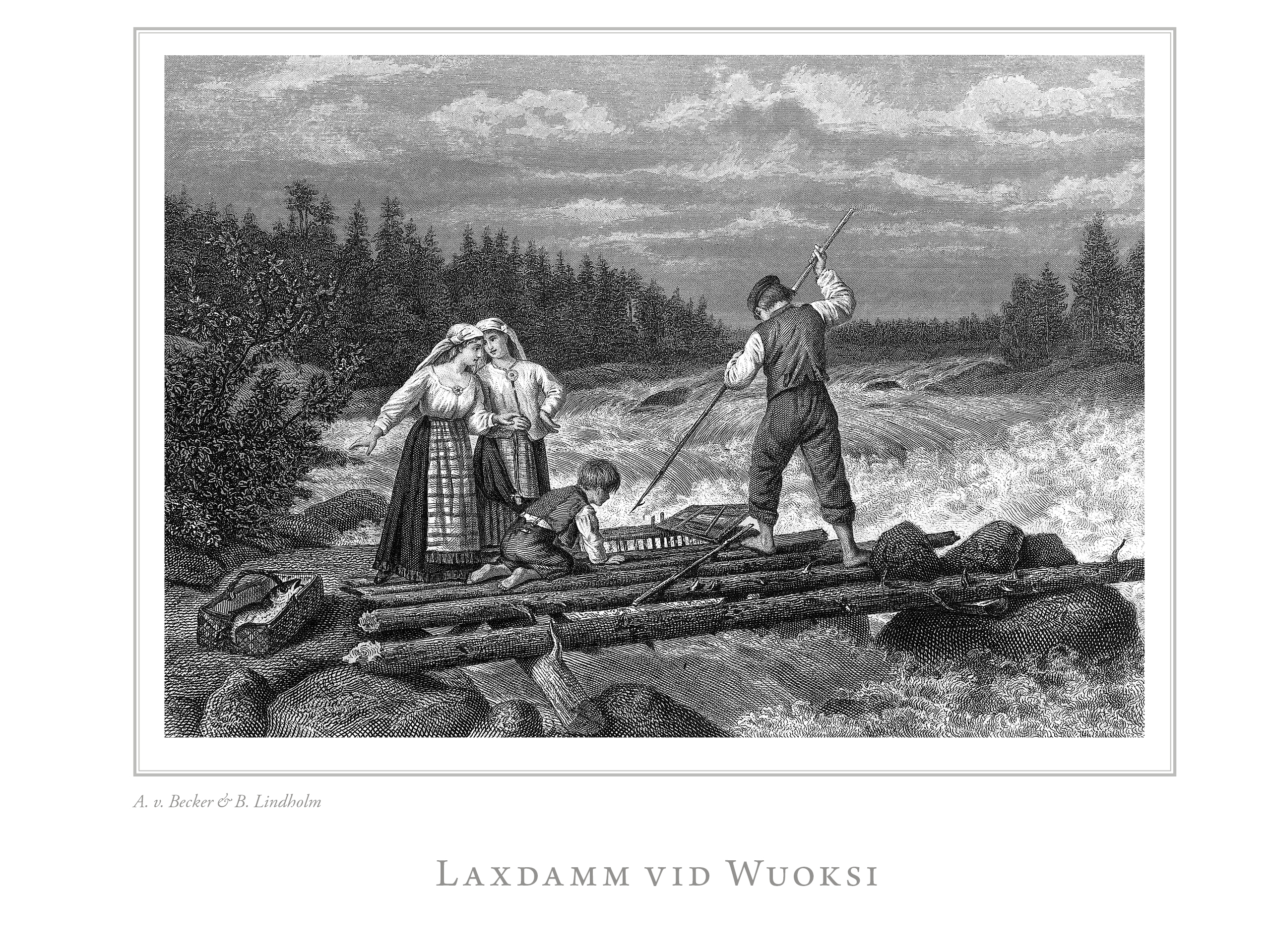
Fishing along the Vuoksi rivier in Karelia
