= Mika Kivimäki =

Finnish social epidemiologist

Mika Juhani Kivimäki is a Finnish epidemiologist holding professorial positions at both University College London and the University of Helsinki.

== Academic career ==
Kivimäki is the director of the Whitehall II Study, a long-term cohort study initiated in 1985 that investigates the social determinants of health among British civil servants. He also leads several major international multicohort collaborations, including the Individual-Participant-Data Meta-analysis in Working Populations (IPD-Work) consortium, which integrates data from 17 European cohort studies.

== Research contributions ==
Kivimäki’s research focuses on identifying modifiable risk factors for adult-onset chronic diseases. He has authored over 1,400 peer-reviewed publications, significantly advancing understanding of midlife risk and protective factors in relation to conditions such as diabetes, cardiovascular disease, dementia, and multimorbidity.

He is widely recognised for pioneering work in social epidemiology, particularly the associations between life stress, socioeconomic status, and chronic disease. His research has also explored the role of prediabetes in the development of type 2 diabetes and the impact of systemic inflammation and severe infections on depression, cognitive decline, and dementia.

In recent years, Kivimäki has contributed to the field of biological ageing by linking obesity and social disadvantage to accelerated ageing. By integrating longitudinal cohort data with proteomic biomarkers, his work has demonstrated the predictive value of organ-specific ageing signatures for future disease.

Kivimäki serves as a scientific advisor to international health organisations, including the World Health Organization, and contributes to global reports and commissions such as the Lancet Commissions. His work has been cited in several clinical guidelines on disease prevention.

== Honours and recognition ==
Kivimäki is listed as a Highly Cited Researcher by Clarivate and is ranked among the Best Medicine Scientists in the World by Research.com. He is a Fellow of the Academy of Medical Sciences and a member of the Academia Europaea.
