= Samuli Kivimäki =

Finnish ice hockey player

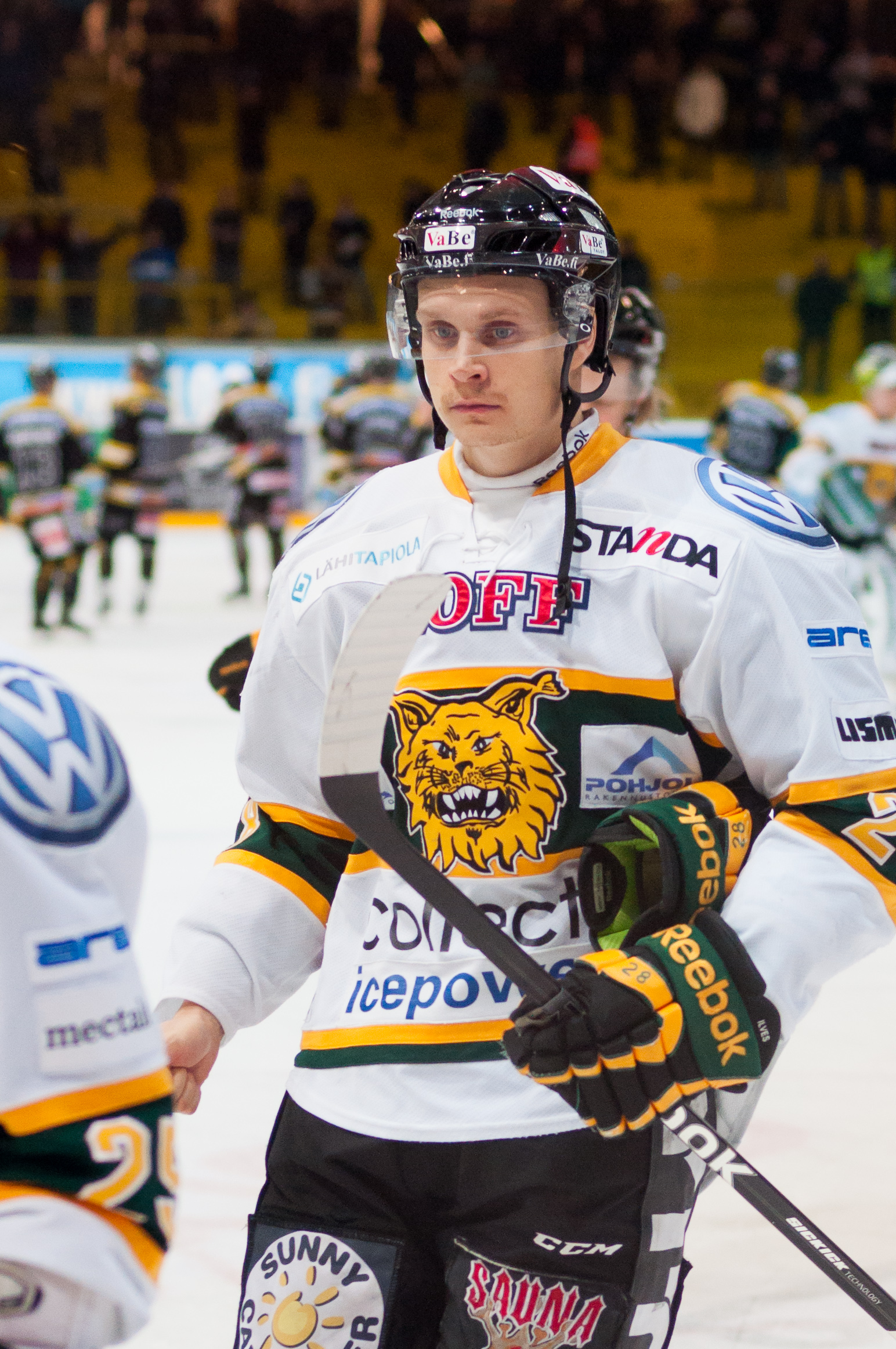
- Born: August 9, 1988 (age 36); Vaasa, FIN
- Height: 6 ft 2 in (188 cm)
- Weight: 203 lb (92 kg; 14 st 7 lb)
- Position: Right wing
- Shot: Right
- team Former teams: Free agent Lukko; Ilves; Sport
- Playing career: 2006–2022

Samuli Kivimäki (born August 9, 1988) is a Finnish professional ice hockey right winger who is a free agent.

He previously played professionally in Finland's Liiga for Lukko, Ilves and Vaasan Sport.

He last signed with Pionniers de Chamonix-Mont Blanc in the Ligue Magnus in France on June 17, 2019, but left the team four months later due to injury without ever playing for the team.

== Career statistics ==
			Regular season					Playoffs
Season	Team	League	GP	G	A	Pts	PIM	GP	G	A	Pts	PIM
2003–04	Vaasan Sport U16	U16 SM-sarja	22	12	20	32	36	—	—	—	—	—
2004–05	Vaasan Sport U18	U18 SM-sarja	19	5	8	13	26	—	—	—	—	—
2005–06	HC TPS U18	U18 SM-sarja	29	11	7	18	24	—	—	—	—	—
2005–06	HC TPS U20	U20 SM-liiga	12	0	0	0	2	—	—	—	—	—
2006–07	HC TPS U20	U20 SM-liiga	5	0	0	0	0	—	—	—	—	—
2006–07	Vaasan Sport U20	U20 I-Divisioona Q	2	3	5	8	2	—	—	—	—	—
2006–07	Vaasan Sport U20	U20 I-Divisioona	20	12	16	28	12	2	2	1	3	0
2006–07	Vaasan Sport	Mestis	2	0	0	0	0	—	—	—	—	—
2007–08	Vaasan Sport U20	U20 I-Divisioona Q	7	12	8	20	20	—	—	—	—	—
2007–08	Vaasan Sport U20	U20 I-Divisioona	21	30	25	55	14	3	3	2	5	29
2007–08	Vaasan Sport	Mestis	13	1	3	4	2	—	—	—	—	—
2008–09	Vaasan Sport U20	U20 I-Divisioona Q	3	12	4	16	0	—	—	—	—	—
2008–09	Vaasan Sport U20	U20 I-Divisioona	1	0	2	2	0	—	—	—	—	—
2008–09	Vaasan Sport	Mestis	44	13	18	31	4	12	2	1	3	20
2009–10	Lukko U20	U20 SM-liiga	1	0	1	1	0	—	—	—	—	—
2009–10	Lukko	SM-liiga	43	7	8	15	8	1	0	0	0	0
2010–11	Lukko	SM-liiga	44	5	5	10	18	13	2	0	2	2
2010–11	LeKi	Mestis	2	1	2	3	0	—	—	—	—	—
2011–12	Lukko	SM-liiga	15	0	3	3	2	—	—	—	—	—
2011–12	LeKi	Mestis	2	2	0	2	2	—	—	—	—	—
2011–12	Ilves	SM-liiga	13	3	6	9	0	—	—	—	—	—
2012–13	Ilves	SM-liiga	54	4	12	16	47	—	—	—	—	—
2012–13	LeKi	Mestis	2	1	1	2	2	—	—	—	—	—
2013–14	Vaasan Sport	Mestis	47	38	16	54	43	6	1	3	4	0
2014–15	Vaasan Sport	Liiga	7	1	1	2	0	—	—	—	—	—
2015–16	Vaasan Sport	Liiga	—	—	—	—	—	—	—	—	—	—
2017–18	Malax IF	2. Divisioona	6	15	9	24	0	—	—	—	—	—
2017–18	Asplöven HC	Hockeyettan	6	3	3	6	0	—	—	—	—	—
2017–18	Nybro Vikings IF	Hockeyettan	17	13	7	20	33	—	—	—	—	—
2018–19	Brest Albatros Hockey	France2	23	23	14	37	8	9	8	3	11	40
2021–22	KoMu HT	2. Divisioona	4	1	5	6	2	—	—	—	—	—
Liiga totals			176	20	35	55	75	14	2	0	2	2
Mestis totals			112	56	40	96	53	25	3	5	8	22
