= Vaskiluoto power stations =

Power station in Finland

Coordinates: 63.090107°N 21.552644°E

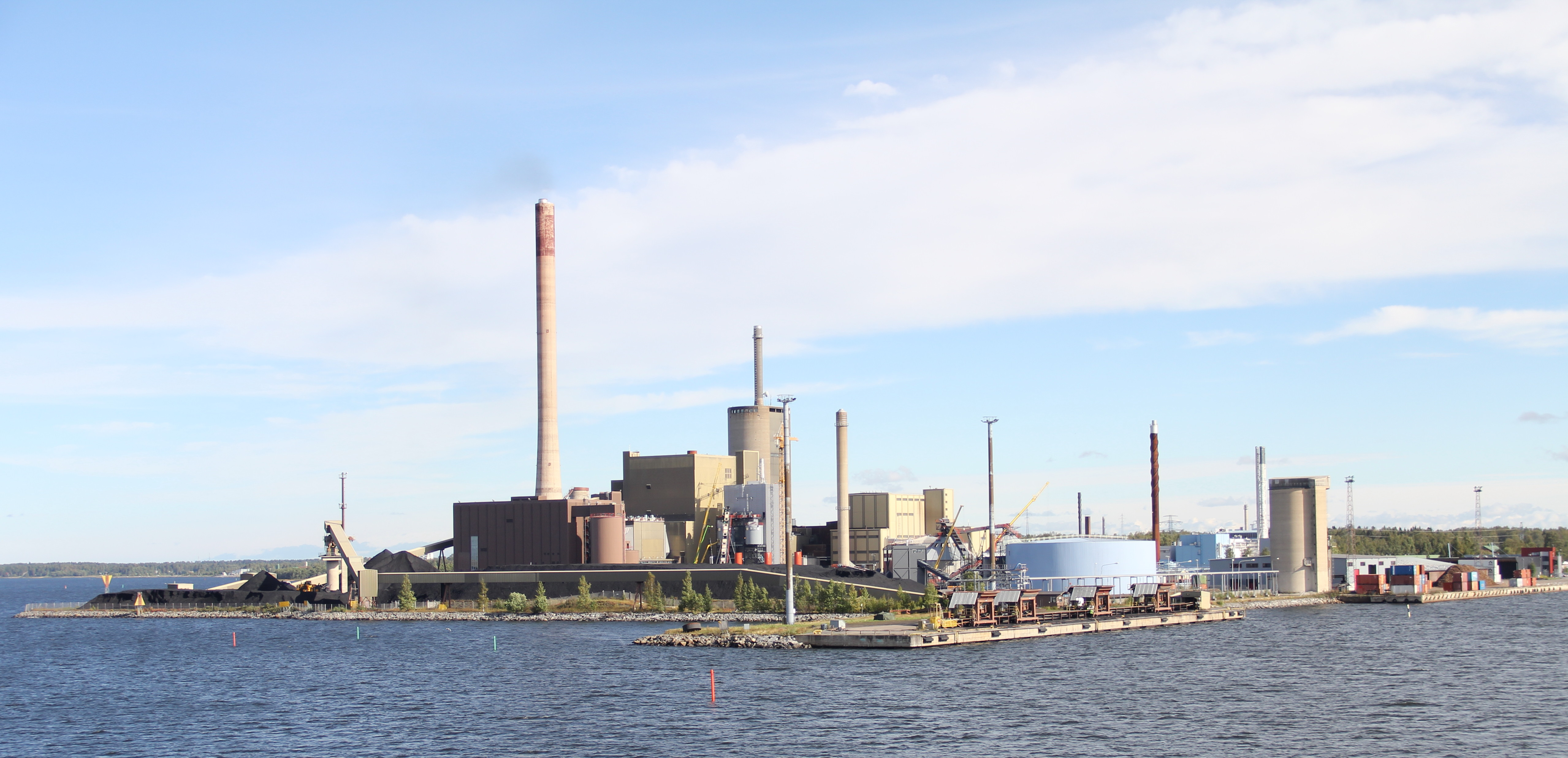
Vaskiluoto power plants viewed from the sea

The Vaskiluoto power stations complex situated on the Gulf of Bothnia island of Vaskiluoto in Vaasa, Finland, comprises three separate power stations connected to the Finnish national grid, Fingrid.

- Vaskiluoto 1, a 38 MW coal-fired power station commissioned in 1958, has been decommissioned. When built, it was the largest power plant in Finland.
- Vaskiluoto 2, commissioned in 1982, was originally built to burn coal, with generation capacity of 230 MW electricity and 175 MW district heating. In 2012 a 140 MW biomass gasification plant was added alongside, mainly burning offcuts and other by-products from the forestry and timber production industries. Both plants remain operational.
- Vaskiluoto 3, a 160 MW plant powered by fuel oil was originally commissioned in 1972, later converted to coal, and subsequently refurbished and restored to burning oil. It is mostly kept on standby, but can be activated to help meet peak power demand.

In 2020, the disused oil storage tanks, excavated into the bedrock, were converted to energy storage use. Waste heat energy from industry, as well as wind-generated energy, is stored in the water-filled tanks in the form of thermal energy, and used mainly for district heating although it can also be used to generate electricity.
