= Finland framstäldt i teckningar =

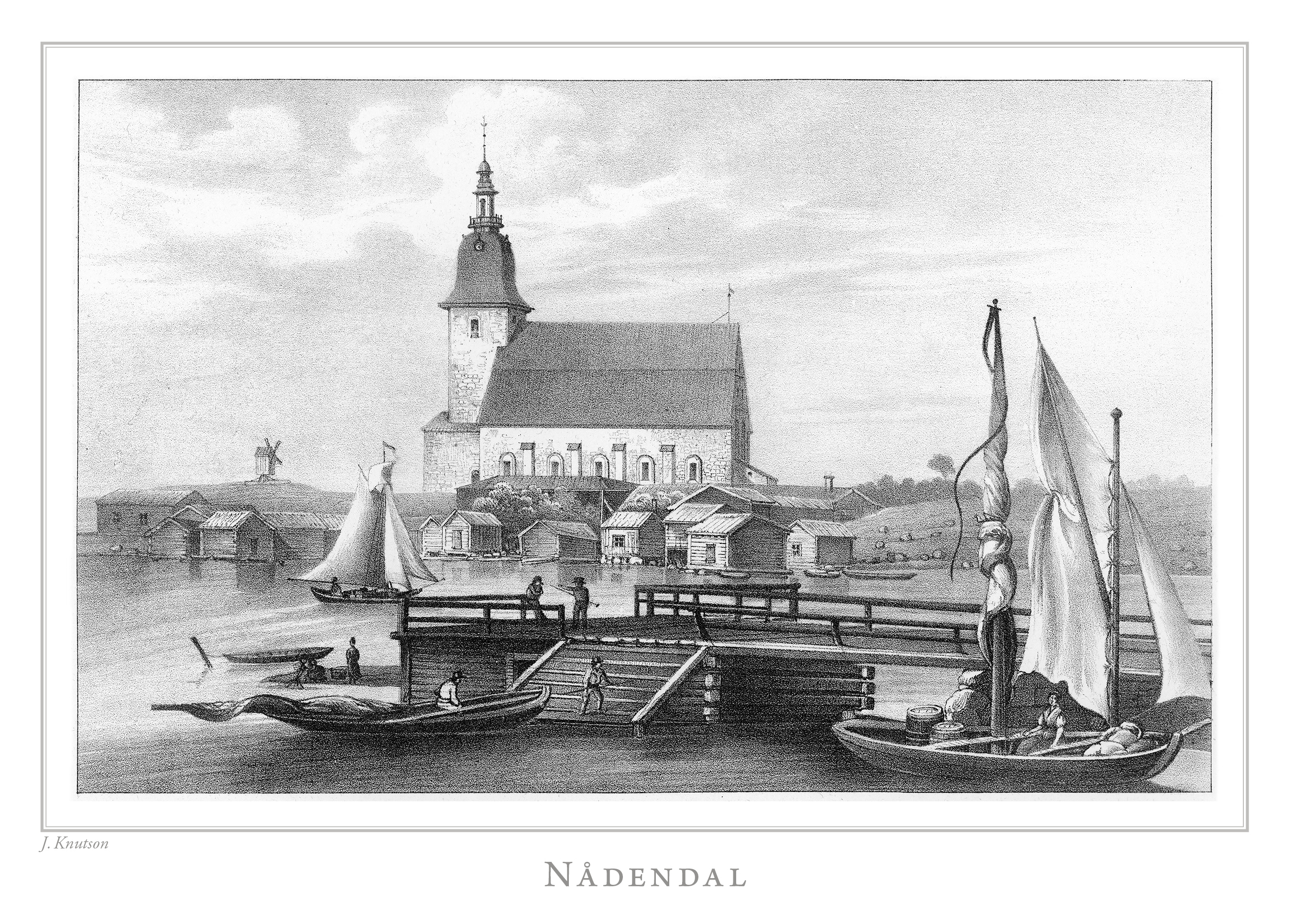
- Illustration of Nådendal by Johan Knutson
- Author: Zacharias Topelius
- Language: Swedish
- Publication date: 1845-1852, 2011
- Publication place: Finland
- Website: https://topelius.sls.fi/

Finland framstäldt i teckningar (in English Finland presented in drawings) is a series of booklets published between 1845 and 1852, containing lithographs of famous places in Finland with short descriptions, mainly edited by Zacharias Topelius. The illustrations have had a significant role in the history of Finnish art and patriotism.

The publication was republished by Society of Swedish Literature in Finland in 2011 and is freely available digitally. Topelius's similar historical-geographical works include En resa i Finland (A journey in Finland, 1872–1874) and Boken om vårt land (The book about our country, 1875).

== Artists ==
120 illustrations were published, created by the following artists:

- Johan Knutson 48 illustrations
- Pehr Adolf Kruskopf 31 illustrations
- Magnus von Wright 17 illustrations
- Lennart Forstén 14 illustrations
- Adolf Wilhelm Lindeström 5 illustrations
- Torsten Wilhelm Forstén 1 illustration
- Jacob Boström 1 illustration
- Erik Westerling 1 illustration
