= Suohpanterror =

Sámi activist art group

- Formation: 2012
- Type: Activist artist group
- Headquarters: Finland
- Award: Kritiikin Kannukset (2016)

Suohpanterror is a Finland-based Sámi art and activist group. It includes a group of anonymous artists from Finland, Norway, and Sweden, producing memes and other visual arts distributed largely via social media, posters, and performance art. Suohpanterror describes its work as "artivism" with a focus on resisting "colonization and environmental injustice in Sápmi."

== History ==
The group began its work in 2012, using Facebook as a distribution platform. Beyond social media, Suohpanterror's art has been exhibited at Littfest in Umeå, Sweden; the Siida Sámi Museum in Inari, Finland; the Helsinki City Library's Library 10 facility; the World Village Festival in Helsinki; the XXII Triennale di Milano in Italy; Saw/Gallery Nordic Lab in Ottawa; and the 2020 Biennale of Sydney in Australia. Suohpanterror was included in the SAAMELAISTA nykytaidetta = Dálá SÁMI dáidda = SÁMI Contemporary travelling exhibition of contemporary Sámi art that visited Finland, Norway, Sweden, and Germany in 2014–2015. "Suohpangiehta," the group's version of Rosie the Riveter, was used as the cover of the exhibition catalogue.

The group's artists remain anonymous in an effort to keep the focus on their message, but Jokkmokk, Sweden-based artist Jenni Laiti acts as the group's spokesperson.

The group's name, "Suohpanterror," comes from suohpan, the Northern Sámi language word for the lasso used to catch reindeer, plus the English word terror to mean "fear of the lasso." It refers in an ironic way to hostility towards Sámi asserting their identity and rights, including their sometimes being labeled terrorists.

Suohpanterror is known for its propaganda posters that draw from pop art, advertising, and popular culture. The group's primary medium is digital art, employing détournement techniques, culture jamming, and political satire. This often means taking common images and giving them a Sámi context, such remaking the Barack Obama "Hope" poster as a portrait of former Sámi Parliament president Klemetti Näkkäläjärvi.

Suohpanterror's "Suohpangiehta" (2013) poster reenvisions J. Howard Miller's "We Can Do It!" (c. 1943) to signify Sámi feminism and self-determination.

During the 2023 Finnish parliamentary election, in response to long-delayed efforts to reform the Finnish Sámi Parliament Act, Suohpanterror produced a number of posters urging people to vote for Sámi candidates.

=== "Suohpangiehta" ===
One of Suohpanterror's most widely reproduced images is "Suohpangiehta," its 2013 reenvisioning of J. Howard Miller's "We Can Do It!" poster, replacing Rosie the Riveter's factory garb with a gákti, liidni, and gahpir (traditional Northern Sámi clothing). Above her is the phrase "suohpangiehta," which translates literally from Northern Sámi as 'lasso hand' and refers to someone particularly skilled in using a lasso. The image has been described as speaking to Sámi feminism, as well as appropriating notions of American power and military might. Suohpanterror spokesperson Jenni Laiti describes the image as saying to Sámi "This is who we are and we can do it."

== Message ==
In line with the Sámi ČSV movement, Suohpanterror seeks to draw attention to the rights of the Sámi people and the grievances they have experienced with its "artivism," including discrimination and racism, exploitation of Sápmi's natural resources, and Finland's failure to ratify International Labour Organization Convention 169 on Indigenous and Tribal Peoples. Some of Suohpanterror's works are intended for internal discussion among Sámi, while others are for the majority Nordic population. The group also comments on the problems of indigenous peoples and minorities living elsewhere in the world. Suohpanterror says it encourages civil disobedience, but does not condone violence.

In 2014, the group mounted a public display of anti-mining posters in Utsjoki, Finland, to support opposition to plans for a diamond mine in the area. In 2015, Suohpanterror worked with Greenpeace and Niillas Holmberg when Holmberg scaled the equestrian statue of Marshal Mannerheim in Helsinki to unfurl banners and the Sámi flag in protest of Finland's policies towards Sámi and the Arctic. In 2016, the group designed a May Day logo for the Finnish Communist Party (SKP) with a raised Sámi fist and the Finnish–Sámi bilingual slogan "Alas porvarihallitus! — Borgárráđđehus vulos!" ('Down with the bourgeois government!'). The same year, the group send postcards depicting hanged Sámi to the Parliament of Finland to protest the Teno Fisheries Agreement. In 2018, Suohpanterror partnered with Greenpeace and Sámi youth organization Suoma Sámi Nuorat to protest plans for the Arctic Ocean Railway.

== Awards ==
Suohpanterror was awarded the 2016 Finnish Critics Association Kritiikin Kannukset Award. According to the jury, Suohpanterror was recognized for "using the language of art in a striking and artistic way," as well as for combining icons from art history and popular culture with documentary themes. Suohpanterror is the first group of anonymous artists to receive a Kritiikin Kannukset Award.

== Exhibitions ==
A partial list of solo and group exhibitions featuring Suohpanterror

- Rájágeassin/Rajanveto, Pro Artibus Gallery Sinne, Helsinki, Finland — 14 August – 6 September 2020
- 22nd Biennale of Sydney, Campbelltown Arts Centre, Campbelltown, New South Wales, Australia — 1 June – 4 October 2020
- Everyday Experiments, XXII Triennale di Milano, Finland Pavilion, Milan, Italy — 1 March – 1 September 2019
- A Toolkit for Revolution, Gallery 44 Vitrines, Ottawa, Ontario, Canada — 17 October – 1 December 2018
- Together We Rise, Yösäilö, Tampere, Finland — 23 November 2017 – 2 January 2018
- World-Ecology 2018, University of Helsinki — 15–18 August 2018
- Sanoinkuvaamattomasta faktantarkistukseen, Aine Art Museum, Tornio, Finland — 10 November 2017 – 7 January 2018
- Suohpanterror Poster Art, A38, Budapest, Hungary — 23–29 May 2017
- DeCO_{2}onizing Minds, Saariaho Järvenpää, Helsinki, Finland — 16 March – 13 April 2017
- Demonstrating Minds: Disagreements in Contemporary Art, Kiasma, Museum of Contemporary Art, Helsinki, Finland — 9 October 2015 – 20 March 2016
- A Fighting Spirit – Periksiantamaton Voima, Sámi Museum Siida, Inari, Finland — 15 August – 30 September 2015
- Suohpanterror Hirvitalolla, Hirvitalo Center of Contemporary Art Pispala, Tampere, Finland — 8–29 July 2015
- XX Mänttä Art Festival, Mänttä, Finland — 14 June – 31 August 2015
- The Last Artists Exhibition, Kunsthalle Helsinki, Helsinki, Finland — 29 November 2014 – 4 January 2015
- SAAMELAISTA nykytaidetta = Dálá SÁMI dáidda = SÁMI Contemporary travelling exhibition, 7 March 2014 – 27 September 2015
  - Rovaniemi Art Museum, Korundi, Finland — 7 March – 25 May 2014
  - Norrbottens Museum, Luleå, Sweden — 18 June – 24 August 2014
  - Sami Center for Contemporary Art, Karasjok, Norway — 14 November 2014 – 4 January 2015
  - Felleshus, Berlin, Germany — 9 July – 27 September 2015
- Terror Comes to Town, Library 10, Helsinki, Finland — 21 October – 10 November 2013
