= Jenni Laiti =

Sámi artist and activist

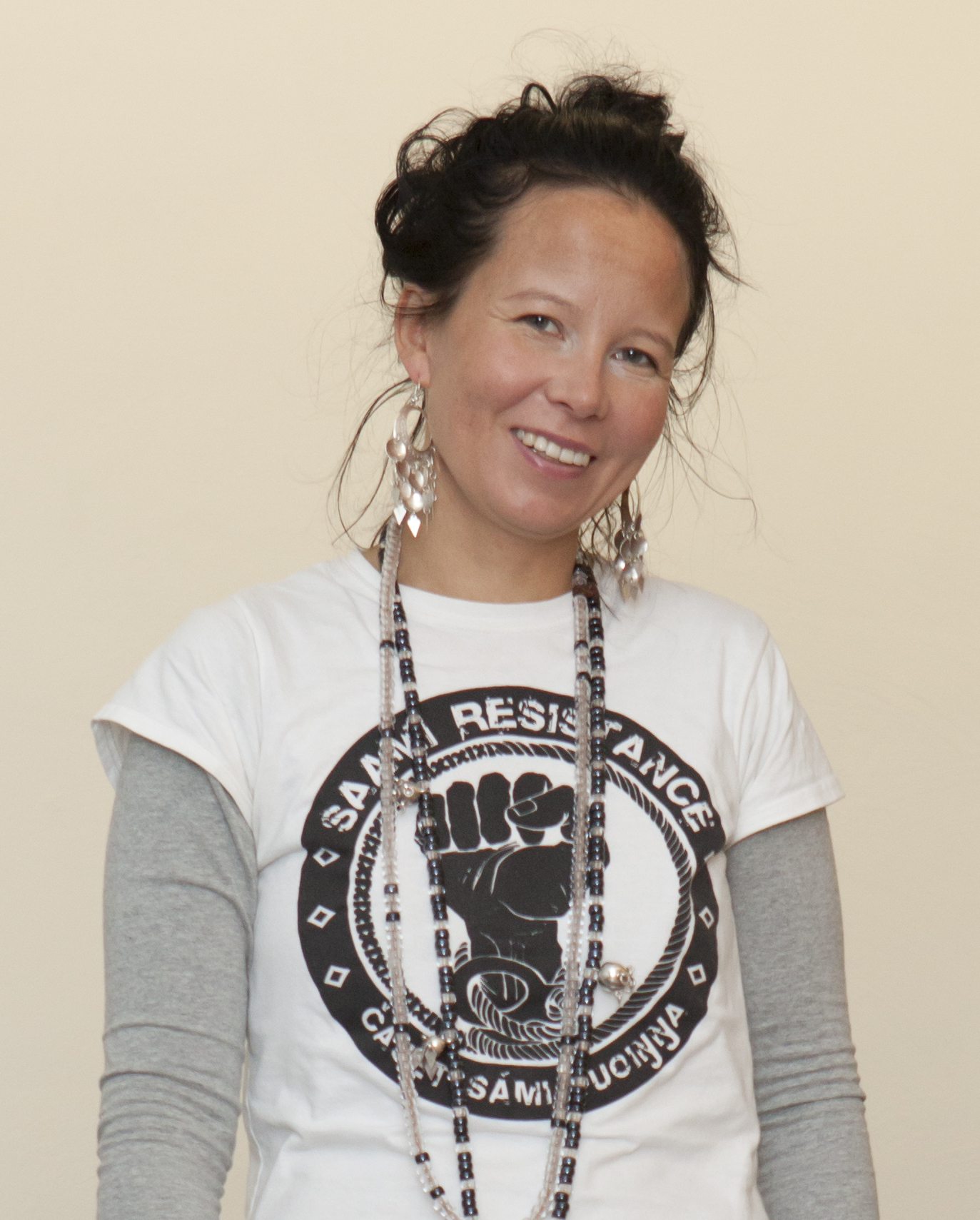
- Laiti at Kiasma in 2015
- Born: 1981 (age 44–45); Inari, Inari, Finland
- Known for: Suohpanterror spokesperson

Jenni Laiti (born 1981) is a Sámi artist and activist associated with the Suohpanterror group and the ČSV cultural movement. She is the public spokesperson for Suohpanterror, whose members otherwise remain anonymous.

Born in Inari, Finland, Laiti is based in Jokkmokk, Sweden, where she herds reindeer with her husband and two children. Her father was Sámi and her mother Finnish, but Sámi was not spoken in her childhood home; she later learned the language. Laiti studied Sámi handicrafts and culture at Umeå University.

Laiti's art includes performance art and installation pieces, which serve as a tool for her activism on climate change, decolonization, and Sámi rights. Laiti was the developer of the 2018 Red Line demonstration to protest the Arctic Ocean Railway. In the action, which was organized with Greenpeace, Sámi youth organization Suoma Sámi Nuorat, and Suohpanterror, people dressed in red clothing, many wearing traditional Sámi gákti, held red posts and banners to block the proposed railway alignment.

In 2013, she edited the sixth edition of Elisabeth Utsi Gaup's Sámi-languages children's songbook, Suga Suga Su.
