= Sámi clothing =

Traditional clothing of the Sámi people

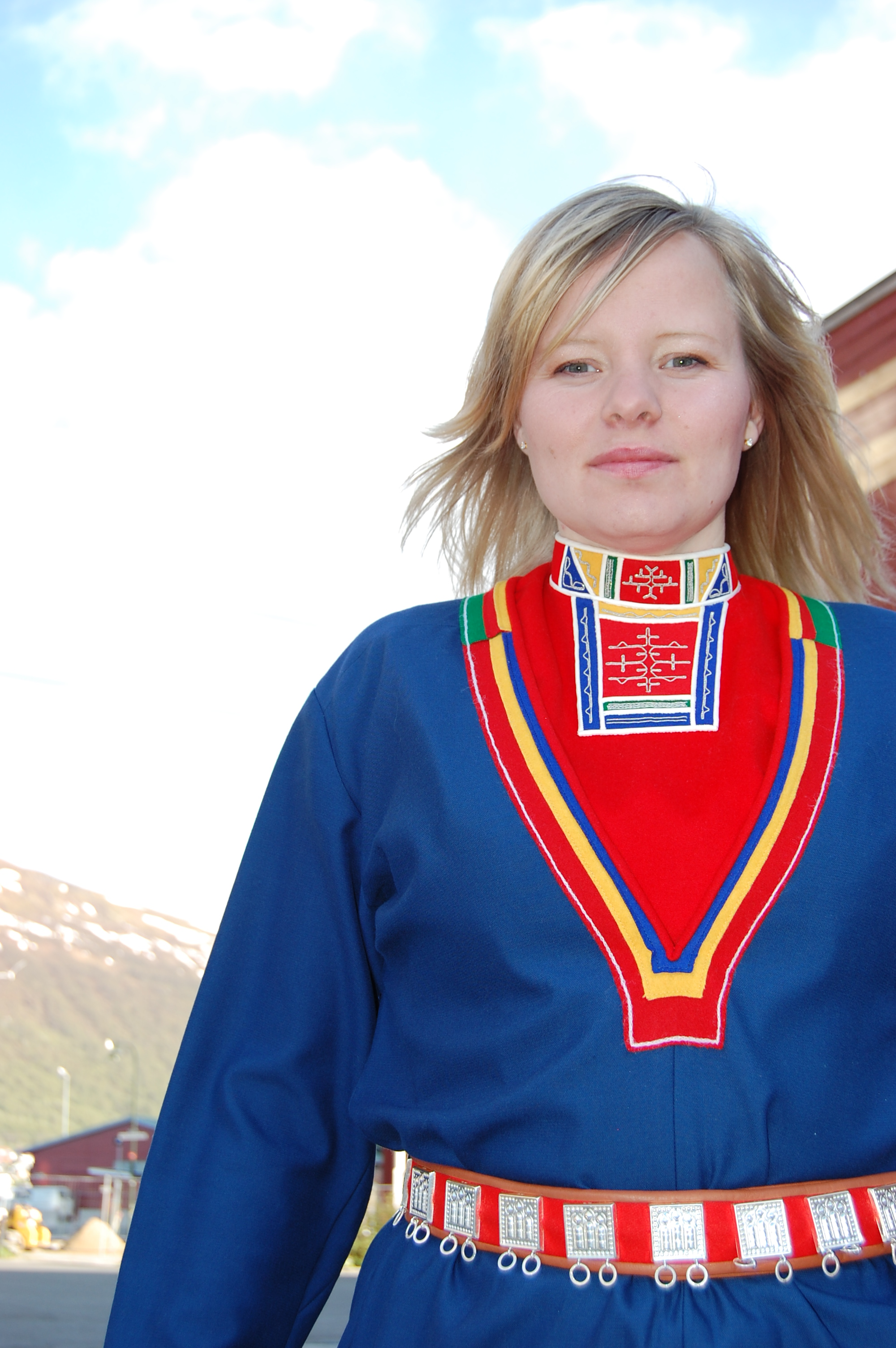
Sámi politician Kirsti Guvsám is wearing Lule Sámi clothing, not a Northern Sámi gákti and boagán.

Sámi clothing is clothing used by the Sámi. The style of clothing they use varies among regions and language groups, but there are many common or similar elements. Traditional elements are often included in modern Sámi clothing to signify Sámi identity.

Elements and outfits (using the Northern Sámi language terms) include:

- Beaska, a traditional Sámi fur coat, made of reindeer
- Boagán, belt
- Four Winds hat (šávká or čiehgahpir), a traditional Sámi headgear
- Gákti, traditional Sámi clothing
- Liidni, traditional Sámi shawl
- Ládjogahpir, a traditional Sámi women's hat with a horn-shaped top
- Luhkka, traditional Sámi winter clothing
- Nutukas, Sámi boots
- Vuotta, shoe bands
