= Máze Group =

Sámi arts collective (1978-1983)

- Mázejoavku
- Formation: 1978
- Dissolved: 1983
- Type: Arts collective
- Headquarters: Máze, Kautokeino, Norway

The Máze Group (Northern Sami: Mázejoavku, Norwegian: Masi-gruppen) was an art collective founded in 1978 in Máze, Norway, by the Sámi Dáidujoavku (Sámi Artist Group), which sought to define and carve out a space for Sámi identity and culture as part of contemporary art.

== History ==
In 1978, eight Sámi artists who'd completed their formal training made plans to return to Sápmi to form an arts collective that would explore themes of Sámi identity. The group's founding members were, in alphabetical order: Aage Gaup, Trygve Lund Guttormsen, Josef Halse, Berit Marit Hætta, Britta Marakatt-Labba, Hans Ragnar Mathisen, Rannveig Persen, and Synnøve Persen. Synnøve Persen, Gaup, and Halse began working together in the mid-1970s when they, along with Ingunn Utsi, Maja Dunfjeld, and Iver Jåks, worked together on a Arts Council Norway project to design murals for a new school in the village of Láhpoluoppal in Guovdageainnu Municipality, Norway.

The Máze Group founders were inspired by other arts collectives in Norway and internationally, which similarly sought to work collectively to make art in support of political agendas. The artists secured a house and workshop space in Máze, Norway, which would serve as headquarters for the group. At that time, Máze was a hotbed for the Alta Conflict protests against plans for a hydroelectric dam on the Alta River, and the Máze Group's house served as a base of operations for many protesters.

The Alta Conflict was a turning point in Sámi political and cultural life, and in parallel the Máze Group was at the center of the ČSV spirit of the time, building national awareness and acceptance of modern Sámi culture and art. This created an artistic and political movement for Sámi opposition to the long-practiced Norwegianization assimilation policies.

Because of the high profile of the Máze Group artists and their political activity, Norwegian police surveilled the group and its members under the pretext of monitoring "extreme political activity".

Soon after establishing the group, the artists began looking across Sápmi, making contact with Sámi artists in Sweden and Finland. A meeting of Sámi artists from across the Nordic region hosted by the Máze Group made clear the need for cooperation and support for Sámi artists, leading to the development of the Sami Artists' Union (SDS) in 1979, and the group also played a central role in identifying and acquiring contemporary Sámi art for the Sámi Museum, part of the RiddoDuottarMuseat museum in Kárášjohka.

The Máze Group disbanded in 1983 due to a lack of funding to maintain the house and continue its activities. However, in 2017 with the support of the Sámi Parliament of Norway, an effort to establish a foundation at the Máze Group house and studios, creating a center for indigenous artists.

== Philosophy ==
The Máze Group identified the way Sámi art was traditionally viewed from an ethnographic perspective instead of from an artistic perspective, leaving Sámi artists excluded from modernism and art history. The artists of the Máze Group were determined to subvert this traditional perception of Sámi identity. They rebelled against cultural stereotypes and folk art and instead used contemporary art styles and techniques to explore themes of Sáminess.

== Literature ==
- Hætta, Susanne. Mázejoavku. Indigenous Collectivity and Art (2020) Dat
