= Synnøve Persen =

Norwegian Sámi artist, author and activist

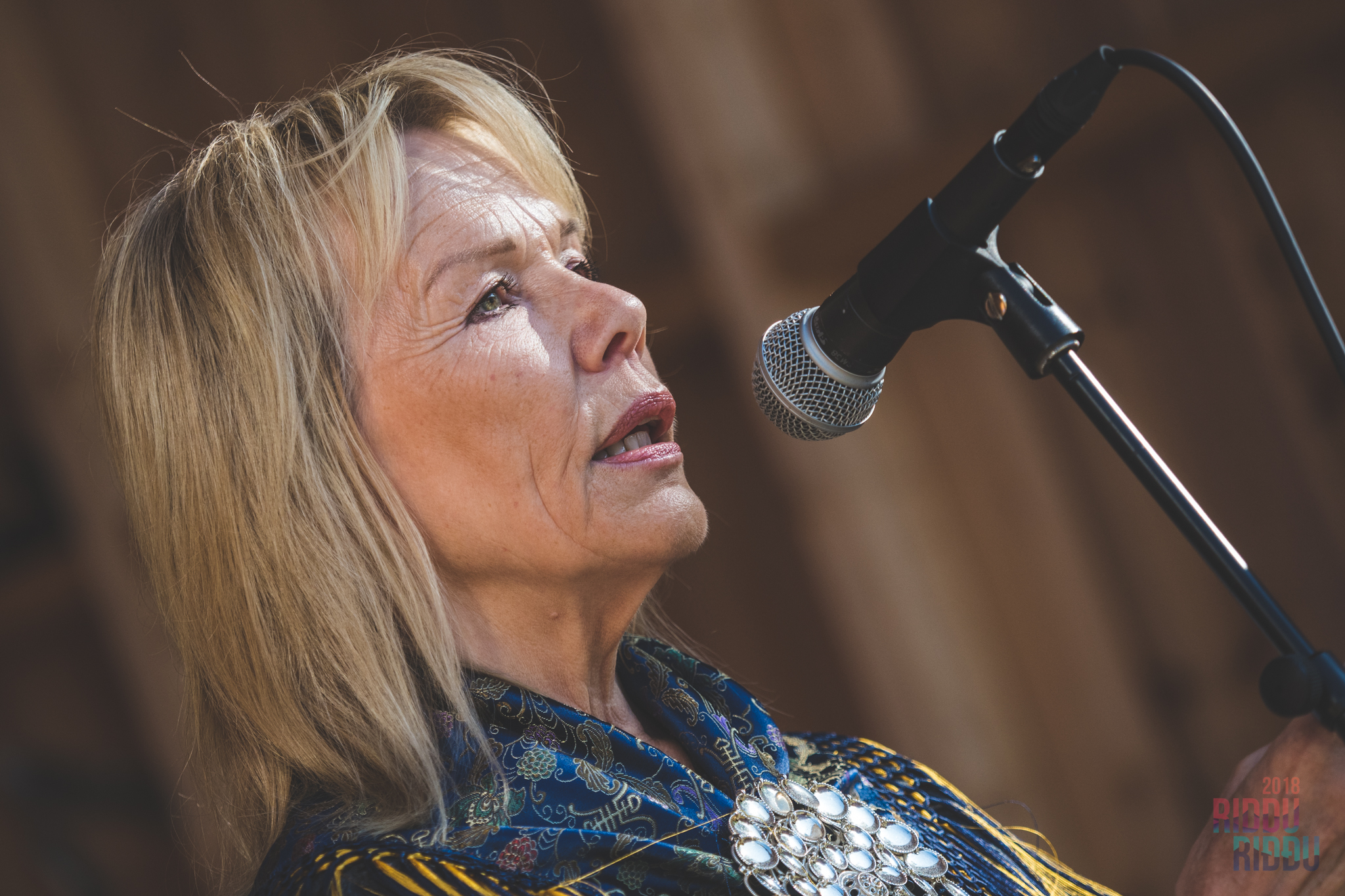
- Born: 22 February 1950 (age 76); Beavgohpis, Porsáŋggu Municipality, Norway
- Website: synnovepersen.no

Synnøve Persen (born 22 February 1950) is a Norwegian Sámi artist, author, and activist who has played an influential role in bringing Sámi identity to contemporary art. She has been twice nominated for the Nordic Council Literature Prize for the Sami language area for her poetry.

== Early life and student activism ==
Persen was born in Beavgohpis in Porsáŋggu Municipality in Finnmark county, Norway. She finished gymnasium in Atla, before moving to Oslo for university. Persen began her arts education in the 1970s, first at the Einar Granum Drawing and Painting School in Oslo, before heading to the Trondheim Academy of Fine Art and graduating in 1978 from the Norwegian National Academy of Fine Arts in Oslo.

As a student, Persen was involved in growing Sámi activism during the Alta conflict and participated in the 1979 hunger strike at the Storting and was a voice of the ČSV political-artistic movement. As student project, Persen drafted in 1977 a flag to represent the Sámi people across Scandinavia. It was quickly adopted as a symbol by protesters across Norway, becoming the first, albeit unofficial, Sámi flag.

The first, unofficial Sámi flag

== Promotion of Sámi art ==
Throughout her life, Persen has worked to strengthen Sámi identity and contemporary Sámi art. In 1978, she was one of the eight founding members of the Máze Group (Mázejoavku), also known as the Sámi Dáidujoavku (Sámi Artist Group), which sought to define and carve out a space for Sámi identity and culture as part of contemporary art.

After the Máze Group disbanded in 1983, Persen worked as a consultant helping to identify and purchase Sámi art for the Sámiid Vuorká-Dávvirat Sámi museum in Kárášjohka, the Nordnorsk Kunstmuseum art museum in Tromsø, the Sijti Jarnge Sámi cultural center in Aarborte, and the Sámi Art Collection held by the RiddoDuottarMuseat. During the same period, she led development of the arts curricula for the Sami Arts and Crafts College.

From 1997–2001, Persen was a member of the Arts Council Norway, and she has served on various committees and councils, including the Sami Olympic Committee. Persen was central to the development of the Sámi Artists Association, which was founded by the Mázejoavku, and the Sámi Dáiddaguovddáš arts center.

== Artist and poet ==
As a painter and a poet, Pedersen uses the Sápmi landscape of northern Norway as a metaphor to represent her native culture. She has said the natural landscape inspires her to tell her story. Her work has been displayed in numerous group and solo exhibitions across Norway and abroad. Public art pieces have been commissioned for several schools and public buildings, including the University of Tromsø and NRK Sápmi.

In 1993, her poetry collection Biekkakeahtes Bálggis (Windless Path) was nominated for the Nordic Council Literature Prize for the Sámi language area. She earned a second nomination in 2008 for Meahci Šuvas Bohciidit Ságat (Tales Spring up from Nature's Rush), another collection of poems, which previously won the Saami Council Literature Prize in 2006.

In 2000, she won the Biret Elle Memorial Prize and in 2018 was named a Commander in the Order of St. Olaf.

In November 2020, her exposition "Bassibáikkit" (Sacred Sites) opened at the Sámi Center for Contemporary Art, running until February 2021.

=== Poetry collections ===
- Alit Lottit Girdilit (Blue Birds Fly), 1981 in Northern Sámi
- Biekkakeahtes Bálggis (Windless Path), 1992 in Northern Sámi
- Vindløs Sti (Windless Path), 1992 in Norwegian (translation by author)
- Ábiid Eadni (The Ocean's Mother), 1994 in Northern Sámi
- Havets Mor (The Ocean's Mother), 1994 in Norwegian (translation by author)
- Meahci Šuvas Bohciidit Ságat (Tales Spring up from Nature's Rush), 2005 in Northern Sámi
- Av Skogens sus Spirer Nytt (Tales Spring up from Nature's Rush), 2006 in Norwegian (translation by author)
- Arktisk Lys/Artic Light, 2007 with Alf Nilsen Børsskog, Almar Paulsen, and Anstein Mikkelsen
- Ruoná Rieggá Vuol Váccašit/Under Grønn Ring Vandre (Under Green Ring Wandering), 2017 with Erling Kittelsen

Persen also published in 2000 Muora ii galgga sojahit eambbo go gierdá (ISBN 9788276010466), a biography of Sámi artist Jon Ole Andersen, co-written with Bente Geving.

== Awards and recognitions ==
Persen was awarded Arts Council Norway Honorary Award 2018.

Awards
Preceded by Miloud Guiderk	Recipient of the Arts Council Norway Honorary Award; 2018	Succeeded by Therese Bjørneboe
