= Britta Marakatt-Labba =

Swedish Sámi textile artist, painter and graphic artist

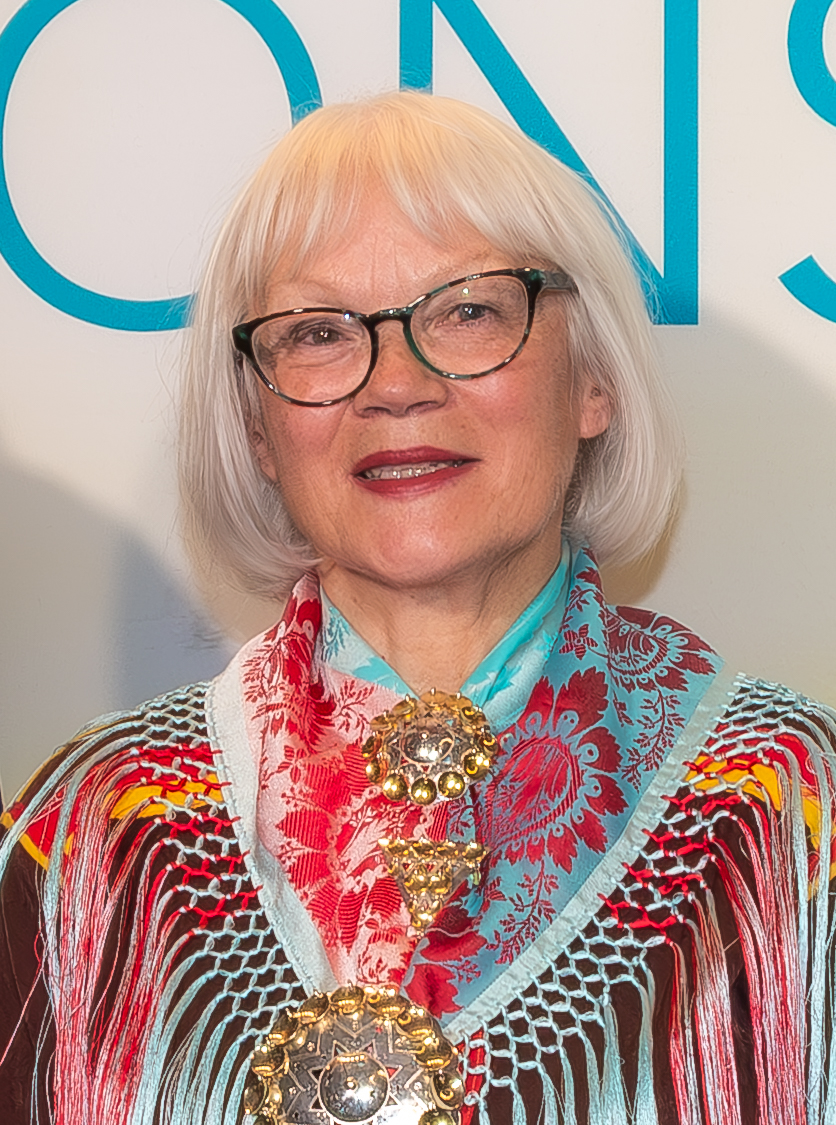
- Britta Marakatt-Labba in 2019
- Born: 18 September 1951 (age 74); Idivuoma, Karesuando, Sweden
- Known for: textile artist; painter; graphic artist
- Website: brittamarakattlabba.com

Britta Margareta Marakatt-Labba (born 18 September 1951 in Idivuoma, Karesuando, Sweden) is a Swedish Sámi textile artist, painter, graphic artist, and a member of the Máze Group.

== Early life and education ==
Marakatt-Labba is one of nine children born into a reindeer-herding family. When she was five, her father Johannes Marakatt died, leaving her mother Anna Maria Nutti to raise nine children by herself. She studied at Sunderby Folk High School (Swedish: Sunderby folkhögskola) from 1971 to 1973. From 1974 to 1978, Marakatt-Labba studied at the Art Industrial School (Swedish: Konstindustriskolan) in Gothenburg, Sweden from which she graduated with a Bachelor's Degree in Textile Art. From 1999 to 2002, she studied at the Sámi University of Applied Sciences in Kautokeino, Norway.

In 2014, she received an honorary doctorate from the Faculty of Arts at Umeå University.

== Career ==
While Marakatt-Labba works with numerous types of media, it is primarily her narrative embroidery using motifs from the Sámi culture and mythology that she is known for around the world. In addition to textiles, she works with watercolors and lithographs. She has also illustrated numerous books and designed costumes and sets for plays.

In connection with the Álta conflict in the 1970s, Marakatt-Labba created the embroidered narrative Garjját (The Crows), which depicted crows landing downhill from Sámi protestors sitting outside of their goahti and turning into black-clad policemen as they marched up the hill to the protestors. She joined the Máze Group: the Sámi Artists' Group in 1978 and was involved in creating the Sami Artists' Union founded a year later in 1979.

From 2003 to 2007, Marakatt-Labba created a piece entitled Historjá that tells the history and mythology of the Sámi people. This epic 23.5 m long textile artwork is normally displayed in the Non-Experimental Sciences building at the University of Tromsø, although it has also been exhibited as part of documenta 14 in Kassel, Germany in 2017.

== Awards ==
- 1993 – The Anna Nordlander Prize
- 2000 – The Rubus arcticus Award
- 2011 – The Asa Kitok Scholarship
- 2012 – The Kauppi Scholarship
- 2015 – The Per Gannevik Award
- 2017 – The John Savio Award
- 2017 – Illis Quorum
- 2018 – The Västerbottens-Kuriren's cultural award
- 2019 – Stig Dagerman Prize
- 2020 – Prince Eugen Medal

== Bibliography ==
- Jan-Erik Lundström (ed.): Broderade berättelser. Britta Marakatt-Labba, Koncentrat, Kiruna 2010, ISBN 978-91-633-7248-3
