= Library 10 =

Former public library in Helsinki, Finland

- Kirjasto 10; Bibliotek 10
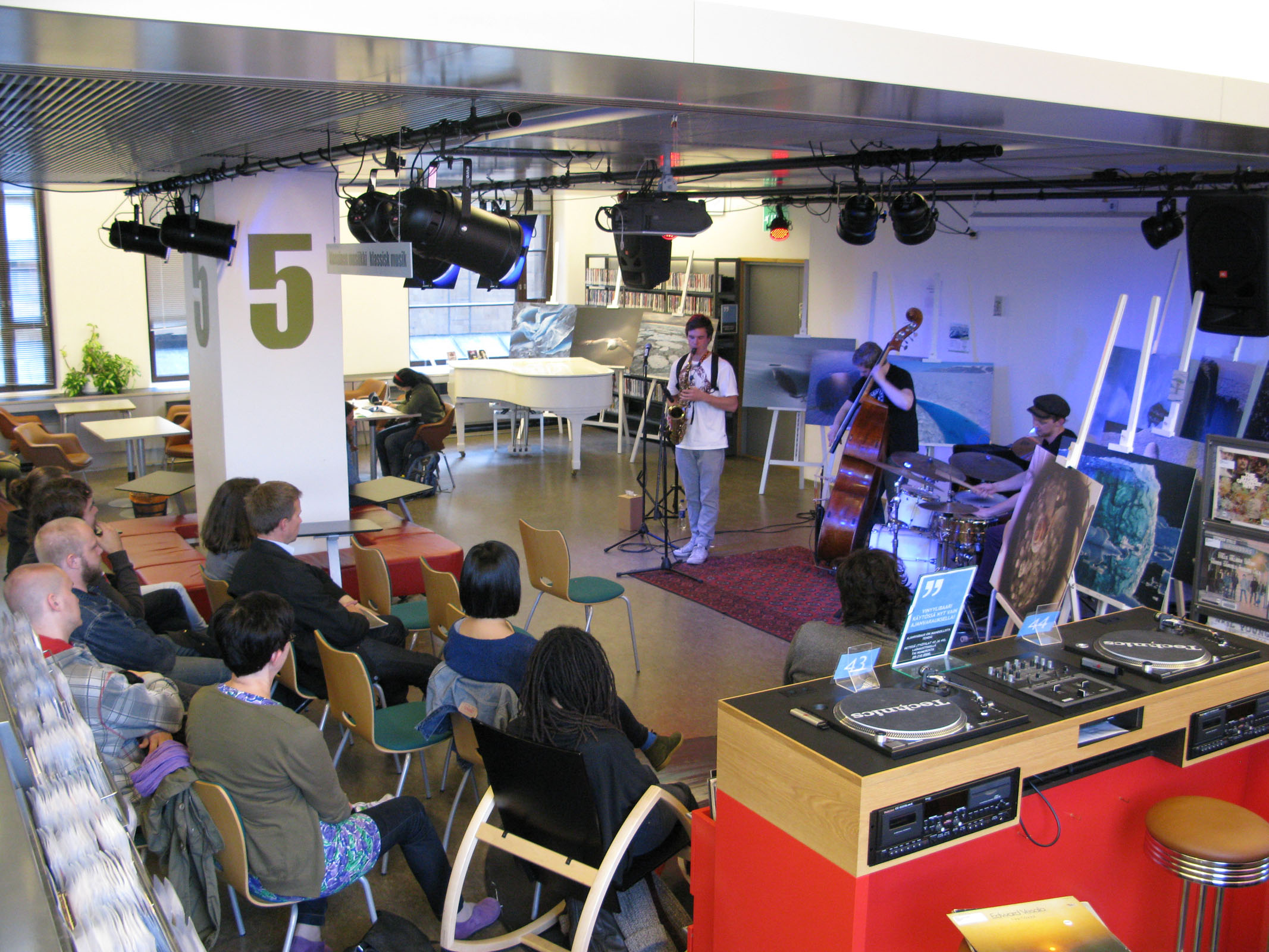
- The band Filunki performing at Library 10 in 2012
- 60°10′17.98″N 24°56′17.34″E
- Location: Helsinki, Finland
- Type: Public library
- Scope: Media and technology
- Established: 1 April 2005
- Dissolved: 30 September 2018
- Branch of: Helsinki City Library

Other information
- Affiliation: HelMet

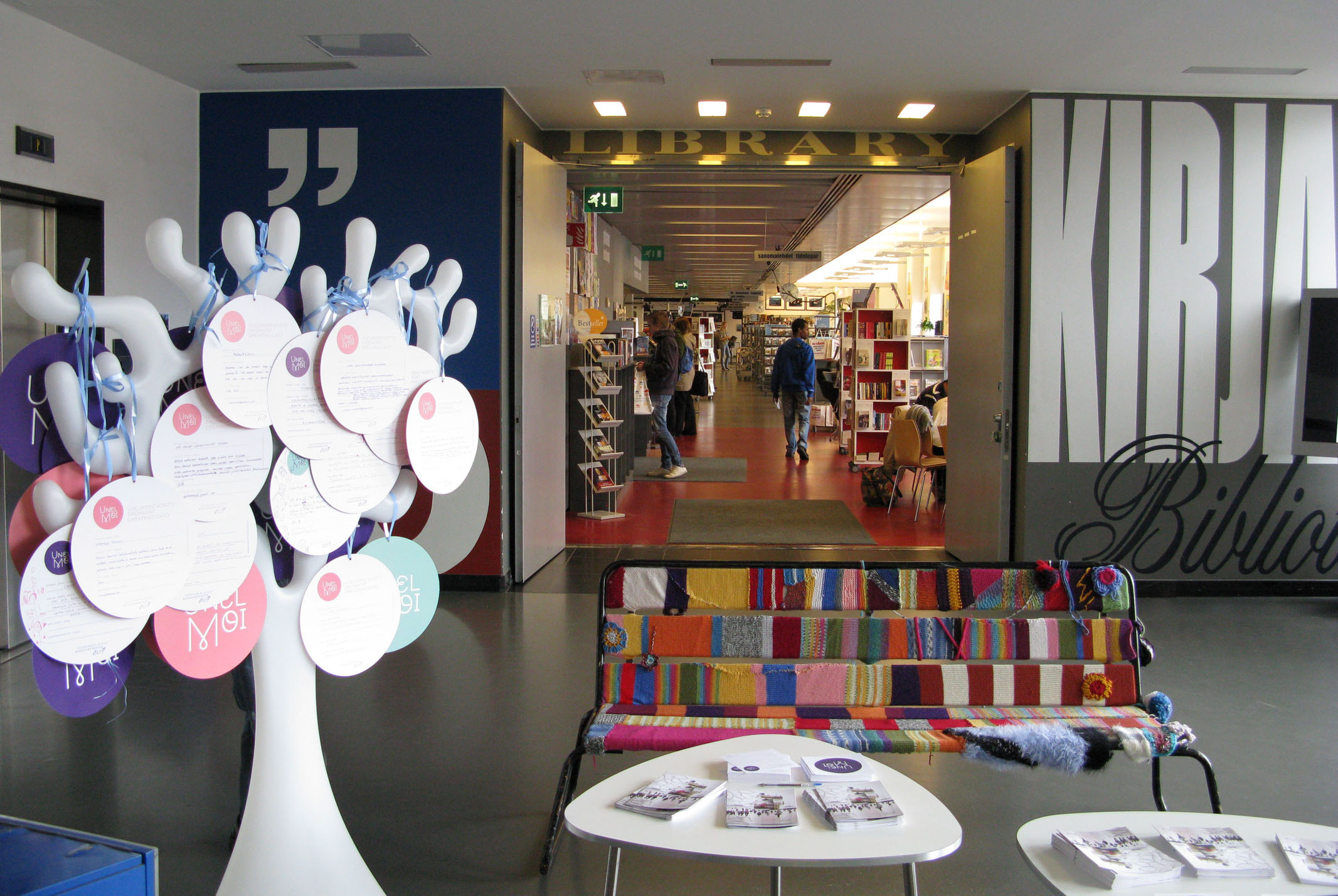
Library 10 entrance

Library 10 (Finnish: Kirjasto 10; Swedish: Bibliotek 10) was a music and information technology space for the Helsinki City Library system from 2005 to 2018 in the Postitalo building in the center of Helsinki. When it closed on 30 September 2018, Library 10's services were transferred to the new Helsinki Central Library Oodi, which opened on 5 December 2018.

Library 10 had the largest collection of music in the Helsinki City Library system, including recordings, sheet music and books inherited from the Music Station (Finnish: Musiikkiasemalta), which previously had been maintained at the main City Library in Pasila. Its IT functions, as well as the collections of comics, film books, and travel guides, were inherited from the library's Kirjakaapeli experimental office.

In 2008, Library 10 had some 600,000 visitors, mostly male and mostly between the ages of 19 and 35. About 20 percent of Library 10's 800 m^{2} (8,600 ft^{2}) of floor space was devoted to physical collections versus 80 percent to people. Of this area, 56 m^{2} (600 ft^{2}) was devoted to 12 m^{2} (130 ft^{2}) suites for audio editing, video editing, recording, and listening, along with a 20 m^{2} (220 ft^{2}) meeting room. An additional 25 m^{2} (270 ft^{2}) stage/performance space was also available, doubling as reading space with chairs and tables when events were not occurring. Beyond its public space, Library 10 had an additional 170 m^{2} (1,800 ft^{2}) of administrative and storage space.

The library regularly hosted events, such as exhibitions, concerts, panels, and presentations. Library 10 was also known for its other innovative projects, including a public 3D printer. Operating as a makerspace, Library 10 included not just recording equipment and 3D printers, but also classes training people to use them.

== See also ==
- List of libraries in Finland
