= Per Flatberg =

Norwegian environmentalist and pharmacist (1937–2022)

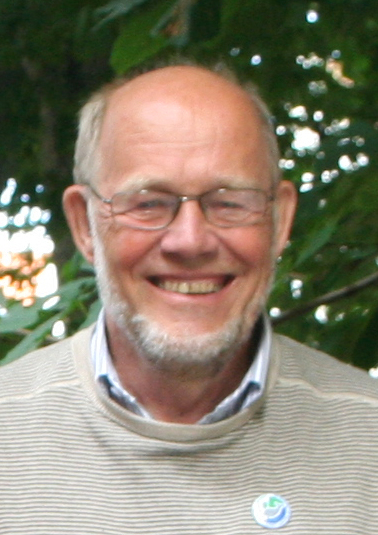
- Born: 18 September 1937; Haltdalen, Trøndelag, Norway
- Died: 11 November 2022 (aged 85)
- Occupation: Pharmacist

Per Flatberg (18 September 1937 – 11 November 2022) was a Norwegian environmentalist and pharmacist. Flatberg took the pharmaceutical degree at the University of Oslo in 1961 and started working at both the university and at a pharmacy. From 1981 he ran the pharmacy in Lørenskog Municipality and from 1990 the pharmacy in Levanger Municipality. In the 1970s, Flatberg was one of the main people organizing opposition to the construction of a hydroelectric plant and dam on the Alta River in Finnmark, in what became known as the Alta controversy, and was given a large fine afterwards. Flatberg held a number of prominent positions within environmentalism and pharmacy, including being information secretary of Folkeaksjonen mot utbygging av Alta-Kautokeinovassdraget (that opposed the Alta Dam), general secretary of the Norwegian Society for the Conservation of Nature and leader of both the Norwegian association of Pharmacy Proprietors (1995–1999) and the Norwegian Pharmaceutical Union (1974–1978) and as such was the leader of both the employer association and the employee union.

Flatberg died on 11 November 2022, at the age of 85.
