= Beaska =

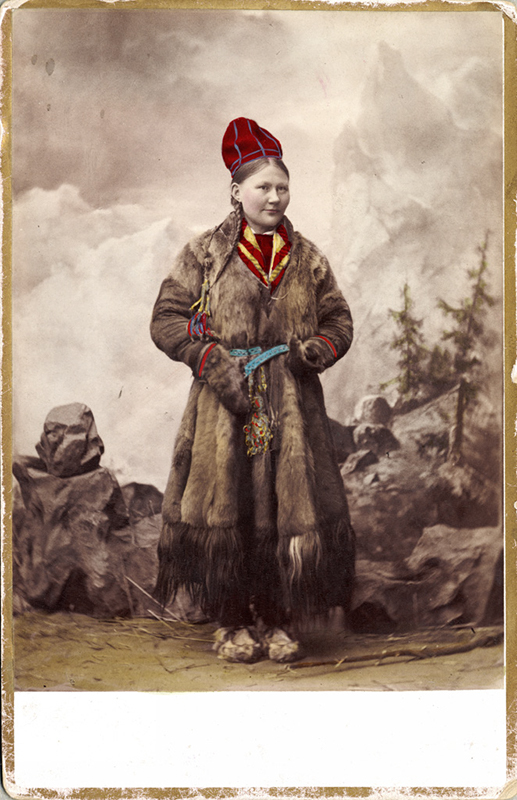
A Sami woman in Beaska

Beaska is a coat made of reindeer fur used by the Sami people. In Gällivare beaska means thicker fur and is mainly used by the richer people. In the Northern Sami language, it could also mean newer fur as it was of young reindeer calves, which are themselves called peschki in some dialects. The Norwegian word for beaska is pesk. The Sami people also use the word muoddá (In Swedish: mudd).

== See also ==
- Four Winds hat
- Luhkka
- Gákti
