= Helsinki City Library =

Municipal library system in Helsinki, Finland

- Helsingin kaupunginkirjasto Helsingfors stadsbibliotek
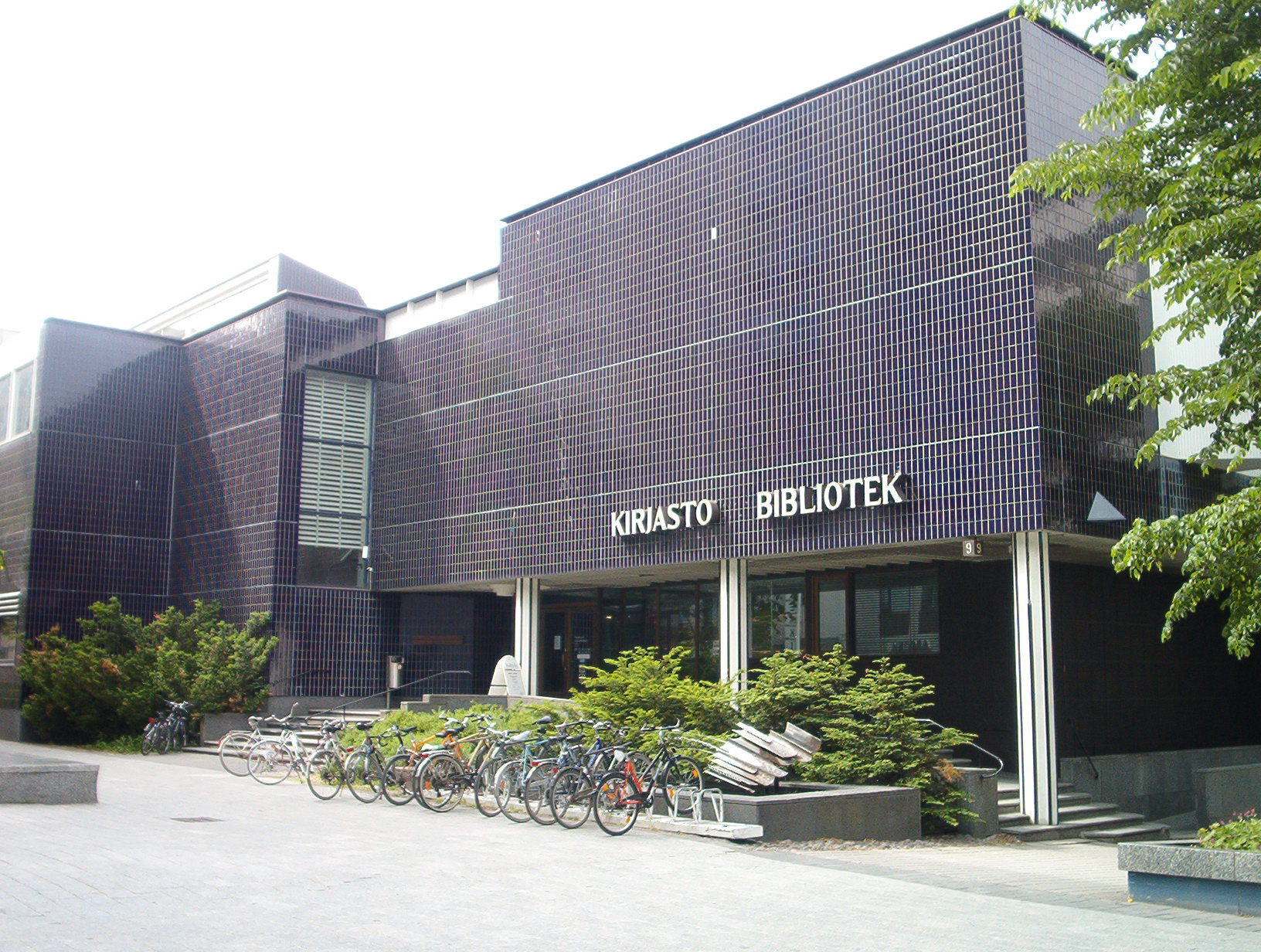
- Pasila Library, the main library in the Helsinki City Library system
- 60°12′2.99″N 24°56′8.88″E (Pasila Library)
- Location: Finland
- Type: Public library
- Established: 7 October 1860
- Branches: 37 + 2 bookmobiles

Collection
- Size: 1.81 million (1.57 million books)

Access and use
- Circulation: 7.28 million (2020)

Other information
- Budget: €39,362,374 (2020)
- Director: Katri Vänttinen (2017 – )
- Employees: 457
- Affiliation: HelMet
- Website: www.helmet.fi/en-US
- References: "Suomen yleisten kirjastojen tilastot" [Finnish Public Library Statistics] (in Finnish). 2020.

Helsinki City Library (Finnish: Helsingin Kaupunginkirjasto, until 1910 Helsinki People's Library) is the largest public library in Finland. Owned by the City of Helsinki, the library has 37 branches and a collection of about 1.56 million books. The City Library is part of the Helsinki Metropolitan Area Libraries network.

== History ==
=== Helsinki People's Library (1860–1876) ===
On 7 October 1860, the Helsinki People's Library (Finnish: Helsingin kansankirjasto) opened at Hallituskatu 11, the current location of the University of Helsinki's Porthania building. Funding for the library was raised by the Helsinki Women's Association with the goal of educating Helsinki's residents and provide them with constructive leisure activities. The effort was led by teacher Helene Simelius, author Zacharias Topelius, and Bishop Frans Ludvig Schauman.

In its first year of operation, the library held about 400 to 500 books (primarily in Swedish) and circulated about 1,700 loans. Borrowing books was free, which allowed the library to enjoy many patrons, but at the same time it caused financial problems. The library had to move from one rented location to another every couple of years, and the volunteer librarians also changed frequently. Due to its lack of funding, the library began charging patrons in 1867, and in 1871 it began to receive an annual subsidy from the City of Helsinki. Thanks to the city's support, the library's finances stabilized, and it could hire a professional staff.

Five years later, the library's board offered to transfer the library to the city. On 28 March 1876, the City Council of Helsinki formally agreed to take over operation of the library. As the library already operated with city funding, there were no major changes in operations. At the time of the transfer to the city, the People's Library's annual circulation was about 15,000 loans and its collections included more than 2,000 books.

=== From People's Library to City Library (1876–1945) ===
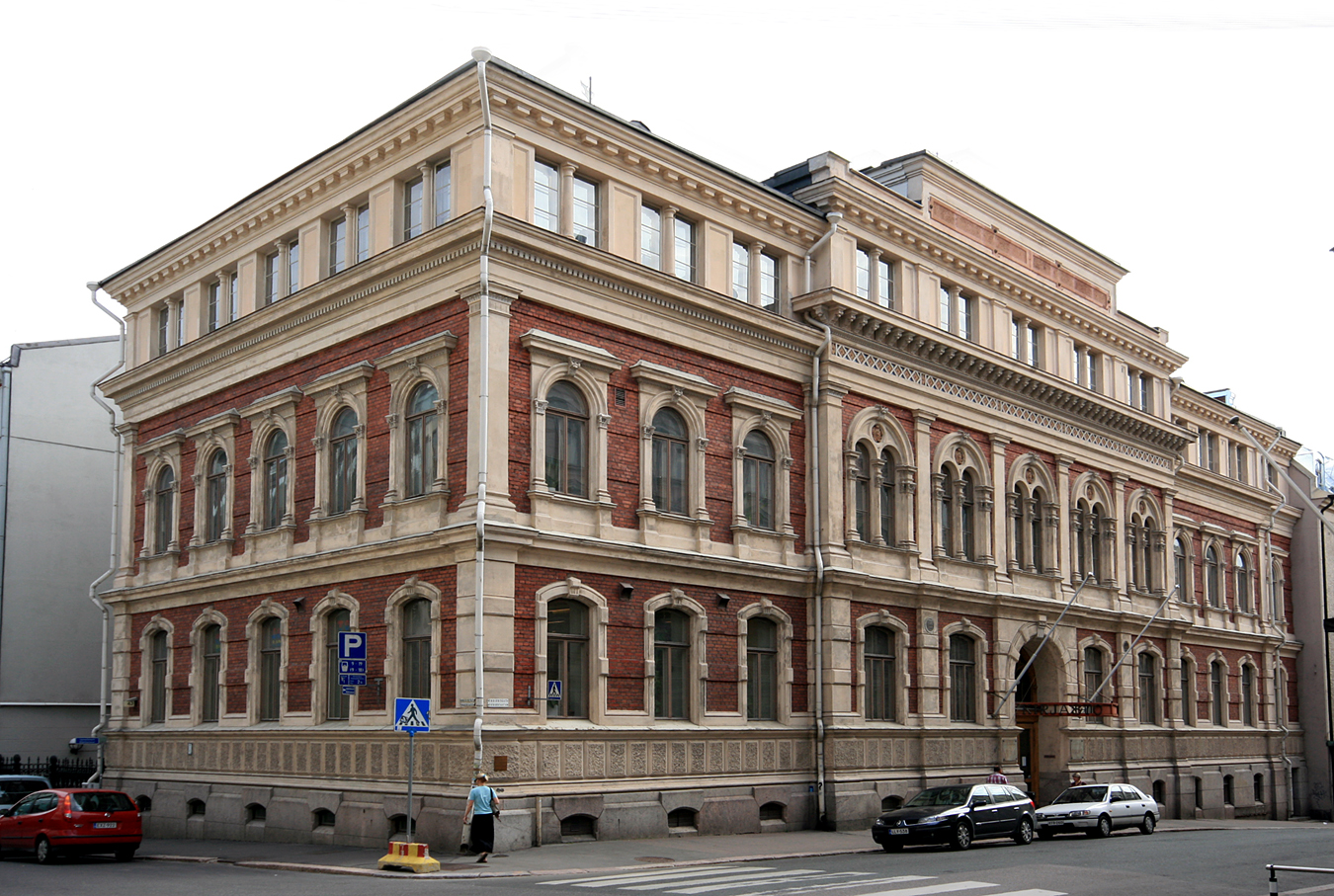
Rikhardinkatu Library

With the city now in control of the library, it began planning for a dedicated building. In 1877, Helsingin Anniskeluyhtiö (Helsinki Liquor Co.), which held a monopoly on alcohol sales in the city on the condition it devoted its profits to benefiting city workers, donated 61,405.29 Finnish markka (€368,659.34 in 2020) for the library to secure its own building. A plot of land was acquired on the corner of Rikhardinkatu and Korkeavuorenkatu in the Kaartinkaupunki district, and architect Theodor Höijer was contracted to design the building. The library moved to its new home in autumn 1882.

With the Rikhardinkatu Library complete, the city began developing branch libraries. In 1898–1899, branch libraries were established in Töölö and Punavuori, and the private Sörnäinen People's Library was taken over by the city. Additional branches opened in Vallila in 1908 and Käpylä in 1926. Most of these branches operated from rented locations, except for the Kallio Library, which received a Karl Hård af Segerstad-building in 1912.

In 1910, the library adopted a new charter as the "Helsinki City Library." As the People's Library, the focus was on the needs of working populace, but the City Library was required to serve all residents regardless of social class.

At the turn of the 19th and 20th centuries, the library's annual circulation volume exceeded 200,000 loans. In 1912, there was a shift to free borrowing and the circulation rate quickly rose to 500,000. In 1930, the library achieved 1 million loans for the first time. To handle the library's growing collection and activity, the Rikhardinkatu Library was expanded in 1922, and through the 1930s the city sought to build a new main library; however, the outbreak of World War II in 1939 mooted those efforts.

=== Growing with Helsinki (1945–) ===
After World War II, the establishment of the Grand Regional Association of Helsinki brought a great expansion to the City Library. It absorbed the libraries of the former municipalities of Haaga, Huopalahti, Oulunkylä, and Kulosaari, along with libraries in the Helsinki Rural District. In total a dozen additional libraries were added to City Library's five branches and one main location. In 1953, it opened a music library and in 1966 it began operating a bookmobile. In 1986, the library finally completed construction of a new main library in Eastern Pasila. In 2019, the Helsinki City Library registered more than 9 million visitors to its branches.

In 1981, the Helsinki City Library began serving as the national central library for Finnish public libraries, and in 2018 it gained responsibility for overseeing development of libraries nationwide under the 2016 Public Libraries Act.

== About the City Library ==
As of 2020, the Helsinki Library has 36 branches and one main location. It also operates two bookmobiles and four "patient libraries" (potilaskirjasto) in medical facilities.

=== Special collections ===
The most significant collection in the Helsinki City Library is the Helsinki Collection of material related to the growth of the city. The Kallio Library has a Detective Library donated by the Finnish Whodunnit Society. The Rikhardinkatu Library has a British Collection of English-language literature and an artist's book collection. Branch libraries also contain material about their local area.

=== Locations ===
Library branch name	Address	Coordinates	Image	Web link
Arabianranta Library	Hämeentie 135 A, 00560 Helsinki	60.2089°N 24.9767°E		Arabianrannan kirjasto
Etelä-Haaga Library	Isonnevantie 16 B, 00320 Helsinki	60.21392°N 24.89174°E		Etelä-Haagan kirjasto
Helsinki Central Library Oodi	Töölönlahdenkatu 4, 00100 Helsinki	60.17363°N 24.93808°E		Helsingin keskustakirjasto Oodi
Herttoniemi Library	Linnanrakentajantie 2, 00880 Helsinki	60.19515°N 25.03352°E		Herttoniemen kirjasto
Itäkeskus Library	Turunlinnantie 1, 00900 Helsinki	60.2120°N 25.0801°E		Itäkeskuksen kirjasto
Jakomäki Library	Jakomäenpolku 3, 00770 Helsinki	60.26051°N 25.07629°E		Jakomäen kirjasto
Jätkäsaari Library and Information Center	Tyynenmerenkatu 1, 00220 Helsinki	60.15993°N 24.92087°E		Jätkäsaaren kirjasto ja infokeskus
Kallio Library	Viides linja 11, 00530 Helsinki	60.18361°N 24.95362°E		Kallion kirjasto
Kannelmäki Library	Klaneettitie 5, 00420 Helsinki	60.23876°N 24.87609°E		Kannelmäen kirjasto
Käpylä Library	Väinölänkatu 5, 00610 Helsinki	60.21083°N 24.94712°E		Käpylän kirjasto
Kontula Library	Ostostie 4, 00940 Helsinki	60.23767°N 25.08528°E		Kontulan kirjasto
Laajasalo Library	Yliskylän puistokatu 4, 00840 Helsinki	60.17928°N 25.05162°E		Laajasalon kirjasto
Lauttasaari Library	Pajalahdentie 10a, 00200 Helsinki	60.15857°N 24.88337°E		Lauttasaaren kirjasto
Malmi Library	Ala-Malmin tori 1, 00700 Helsinki	60.2504°N 25.0148°E		Malmin kirjasto
Malminkartano Library	Puustellintie 6, 00410 Helsinki	60.24641°N 24.86033°E		Malminkartanon kirjasto
Maunula Library	Metsäpurontie 4, 00630 Helsinki	60.23129°N 24.93324°E		Maunulan kirjasto
Munkkiniemi Library	Riihitie 22, 00330 Helsinki	60.19685°N 24.87577°E		Munkkiniemen kirjasto
Myllypuro Media Library	Kiviparintie 2, 00920 Helsinki	60.22414°N 25.07322°E		Myllypuron mediakirjasto
Oulunkylä Library	Kylänvanhimmantie 27, 00640 Helsinki	60.22807°N 24.96266°E		Oulunkylän kirjasto
Paloheinä Library	Paloheinäntie 22, 00670 Helsinki	60.24930°N 24.94136°E		Paloheinän kirjasto
Pasila Library (main)	Kellosilta 9, 00520 Helsinki	60.20083°N 24.93580°E		Pasilan kirjasto
Pikku Huopalahti Children's Library	Tilkankatu 19, 00300 Helsinki	60.2019°N 24.8952°E		Pikku Huopalahden lastenkirjasto
Pitäjänmäki Library	Jousipolku 1, 00370 Helsinki	60.22614°N 24.86050°E		Pitäjänmäen kirjasto
Pohjois-Haaga Library	Kaupintie 4, 00440 Helsinki	60.23249°N 24.88739°E		Pohjois-Haagan kirjasto
Puistola Library	Nurkkatie 2, 00760 Helsinki	60.27121°N 25.05882°E		Puistolan kirjasto
Pukinmäki Library	Kenttäkuja 12, 00720 Helsinki	60.2499°N 24.9912°E		Pukinmäen kirjasto
Rikhardinkatu Library	Rikhardinkatu 3, 00130 Helsinki	60.16623°N 24.94639°E		Rikhardinkadun kirjasto
Roihuvuori Library	Roihuvuorentie 2, 00820 Helsinki	60.19460°N 25.05275°E		Roihuvuoren kirjasto
Sakarinmäki Children's Library	Knutersintie 924, 00890 Helsinki	60.2618°N 25.2113°E		Sakarinmäen lastenkirjasto
Skidi and Stoori Bookmobiles	Rautatieläisenkatu 8, 00520 Helsinki			Helsinki Bookmobile; Stoori; Skidi and Stoori Timetables
Suomenlinna Library	Suomenlinna C 31, 00190 Helsinki	60.14666°N 24.98673°E		Suomenlinnan kirjasto
Suutarila Library	Seulastentie 11, 00740 Helsinki	60.2755°N 24.9975°E		Suutarilan kirjasto
Tapanila Library	Hiidenkiventie 21, 00730 Helsinki	60.26556°N 25.01884°E		Tapanilan kirjasto
Tapulikaupunki Library	Ajurinaukio 5, 00750 Helsinki	60.27437°N 25.03378°E		Tapulikaupungin kirjasto
Töölö Library	Topeliuksenkatu 6, 00250 Helsinki	60.18336°N 24.91747°E		Töölön kirjasto
Vallila Library	Päijänteentie 5, 00550 Helsinki	60.19218°N 24.96239°E		Vallilan kirjasto
Viikki Library	Viikinkaari 11 B, 00790 Helsinki	60.22767°N 25.01272°E		Viikin kirjasto
Vuosaari Library	Mosaiikkitori 2, 00980 Helsinki	60.20873°N 25.14340°E		Vuosaaren kirjasto

=== Closed branches ===
Library name	Year closed	Address	Coordinates	Image
Library 10	2018	Elielinaukio 2G, 00100 Helsinki	60.17166°N 24.93815°E	
Kirjakaapeli	2005	Lasipalatsi, Mannerheimintie 22–24, 00100 Helsinki	60.17035°N 24.93699°E	
Kulosaari Library	2009	Kyösti Kallion tie 1, 00570 Helsinki	60.18569°N 25.00913°E	
Punavuori Library	2004	Bulevardi 42, 00120 Helsinki	60.16236°N 24.93195°E	
Ruoholahti Children's Library	2015	Santakatu 6, 00180 Helsinki	60.16259°N 24.91934°E	

== See also ==
- List of libraries in Finland
