= Helsinki Metropolitan Area Libraries =

- Location: Helsinki metropolitan area, Finland
- Established: 1976
- Branches: 66 libraries, one reading room (journals), six bookmobiles

Collection
- Size: 3.4 million items

Access and use
- Circulation: more than 17 million
- Population served: annual visits approx. 17 million, of which more than 5 million are online library visitors

Other information
- Director: Espoo: Ritva Nyberg Helsinki: Katri Vänttinen; Kauniainen: Piritta Numminen Vantaa: Leena Toivonen
- Employees: 900 library and media professionals
- Website: www.helmet.fi/en-US

Helsinki Metropolitan Area Libraries (Helmet) is a library network in Finland. It consists of the city libraries of Helsinki, Espoo, Kauniainen, and Vantaa.

== Network and operation ==
All libraries in Helmet have common operating rules, procedures, and services. The same library card can be used at any library in the network. Patrons can request material from any library in the network. They can also return and renew materials at any library in the network.

The Helmet network consists of 66 locations and six bookmobiles. The regional book storage facility is located at the Helsinki City Library in Pasila, Helsinki. The 844 m^{2} (9,080 ft^{2}) storage facility's collection includes more than 200,000 books and over 900 magazine annual volumes. Music related materials are stored at the Tikkurila Library in Tikkurila, Vantaa.

== History ==
The libraries of the Helsinki Metropolitan Area have been working together since 1976. At the time, they purchased their first common computer-based circulation system. In the 1980s, customers were given regionally common library cards.

In 2002, the third joint library data management system was taken into use, with the most recent version being implemented in 2013. Experiences from using the system and its capabilities inspired closer cooperation within the library network. This led to the creation of a common collection, which is now in constant use by the whole population of the Capital Region.

According to a study conducted by Taloustutkimus, Helmet was Finland's second most valued online brand in 2012, bested only by Google.

== See also ==
- List of libraries in Finland
