= Arctic Railway =

Planned railway connection from Northern Finland to the Arctic Ocean

- Proposed rail routes into Lapland. Existing or disused routes are shown as grey dotted lines.

Overview
- Locale: Lapland, Finland; Finnmark, Norway
- Termini: Rovaniemi; Kirkenes

Service
- Services: Rovaniemi - Vuojärvi - Sodankylä - Petkula - Vuotso - Saariselkä - Nellim - Rayakoski - Nikel - Kirkenes

Technical
- Line length: 526 km (327 mi)
- Number of tracks: Double track
- Track gauge: 1,524 mm (5 ft)
- Electrification: 25 kV 50 Hz AC overhead lines

The Arctic Railway (also Arctic Ocean Railway) is a planned railway line linking the Norwegian Arctic port of Kirkenes with the Finnish railway network.

== Background ==
Proposals for a rail link between Lapland and northern Norway began serious consideration in 2017, with the aim of linking the Finnish railway network to Arctic shipping routes. In light of global warming making an ice-free Northeast Passage a possibility within the 21st century. Russia has also been re-investing into its fleet of nuclear icebreakers, replacing older ships which had plied the Arctic sea routes since Soviet times with newer models. There are widespread expectations that the Arctic ports of Murmansk, Kirkenes and Narvik will grow in importance in the coming decades, thus necessitating better hinterland infrastructure. Railroads are widely regarded as the most efficient way to transport goods to and from ports, and railroad access is often seen as an advantage in the competition between ports. Furthermore, improving links between Russia and Norway would allow goods travelling by land along the Eurasian Land Bridge to get from China to Norway via only one transit country, Russia, and with – depending on the gauge chosen for the Arctic Railway and the final destination in Norway – only one or two breaks of gauge. Thus problems with additional transit countries such as Iran (southern route) or Belarus/Ukraine (Central route) could be avoided.

Route options under consideration included starting at Rovaniemi or Kemijärvi in Finland to either Kirkenes in Norway or Murmansk in Russia, or from Kolari or Tornio in Finland to Narvik (via Sweden) or Tromsø in Norway. The Rovaniemi to Kirkenes route has been determined to be the most feasible, with an estimated cost of €2.9 billion. €2 billion would be covered by the Finnish government, with the remaining €900 million covered by the Norwegian government.

In early 2019, a Finnish-Norwegian working group assembled by Finland's Ministry of Transport and Communications stated that the volume of cargo was too small to justify the project's costs. After plans for the railway stalled, entrepreneur Peter Vesterbacka announced an alternative plan for the project in May 2019, claiming the railway could be built through private investments from China and the European Union, and with an underground route. As of March 2020, Vesterbacka and Chinese investors are aiming to build an undersea railway tunnel with a route between Helsinki and Tallinn.

In november 2024, Transport and Communications Minister Lulu Ranne says that a giant project is being launched in Lapland due to the threat from Russia. The purpose is to build a train connection from the ports of Oulu and Kemi to Tornio and across the border river to Haparanda on the Swedish side and from there to the mining town of Kiruna and to the port of Narvik in Norway.

== Controversies ==
Environmental and cultural sensitivities exist which affect these plans, with concerns from the indigenous Sámi people that the proposed line would pass through reindeer grazing lands. Indigenous reindeer herders have criticized the plans, arguing that a railway would cut off reindeer migration paths and cause accidents, killing herds. Tiina Sanila-Aikio, the former president of the Sámi Parliament of Finland, has stated that section 17 of the Finnish constitution legally prohibits the approval of the railway, since it "assures the Sami's right to maintain and develop their own culture", which she states includes "reindeer herding, fishing and hunting in the area". In 2018, Greenpeace, Sámi youth organization Suoma Sámi Nuorat, and Sámi activist and arts group Suohpanterror staged protests to block the railway's path.

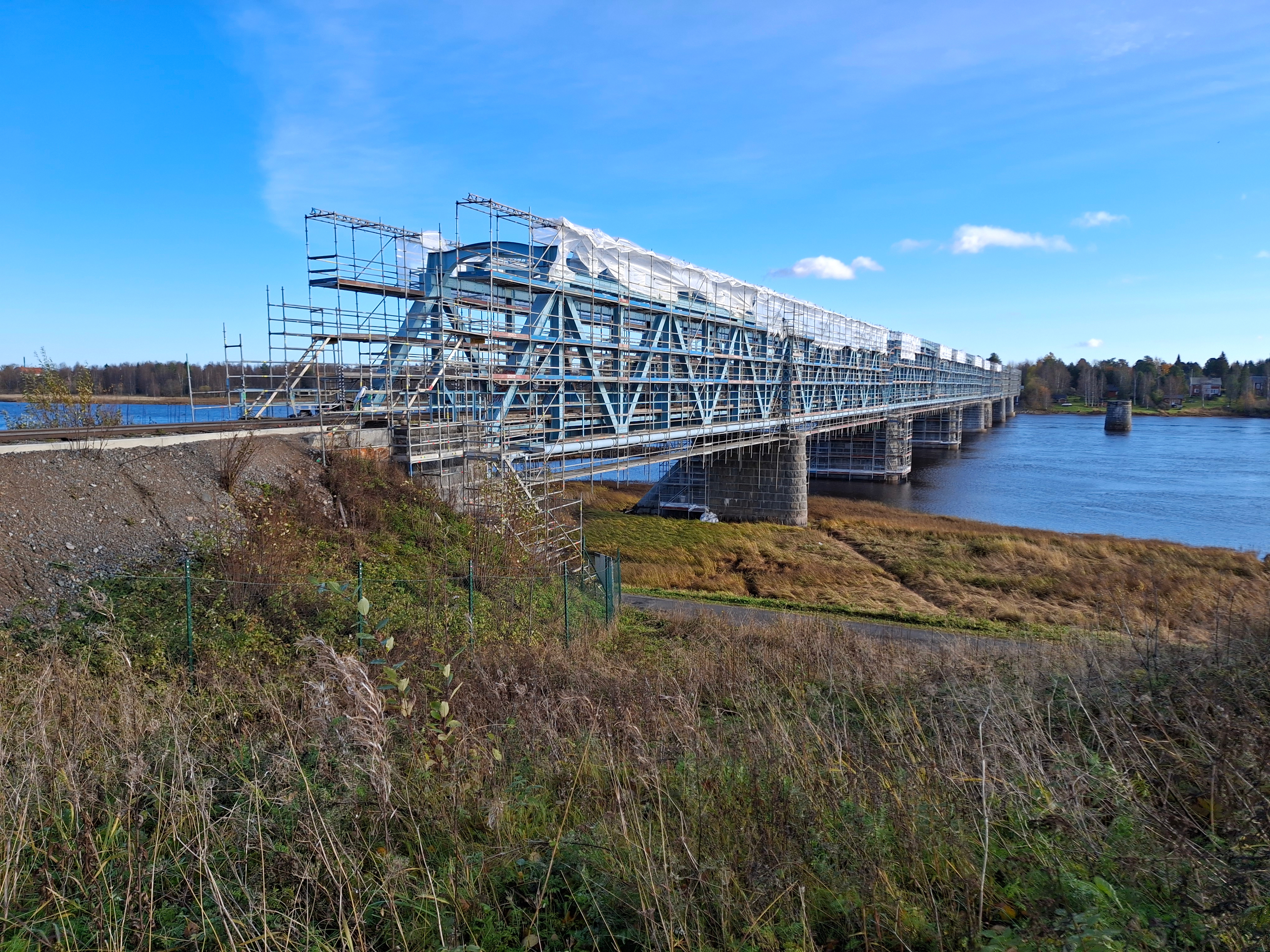
Torne River Railway Bridge between Haparanda and Tornio. Bridge was under renovation in summer of 2024

== See also ==
- Rail transport in Finland
- Rail transport in Norway
