= Luhkka =

Winter clothing worn by the Sámi people

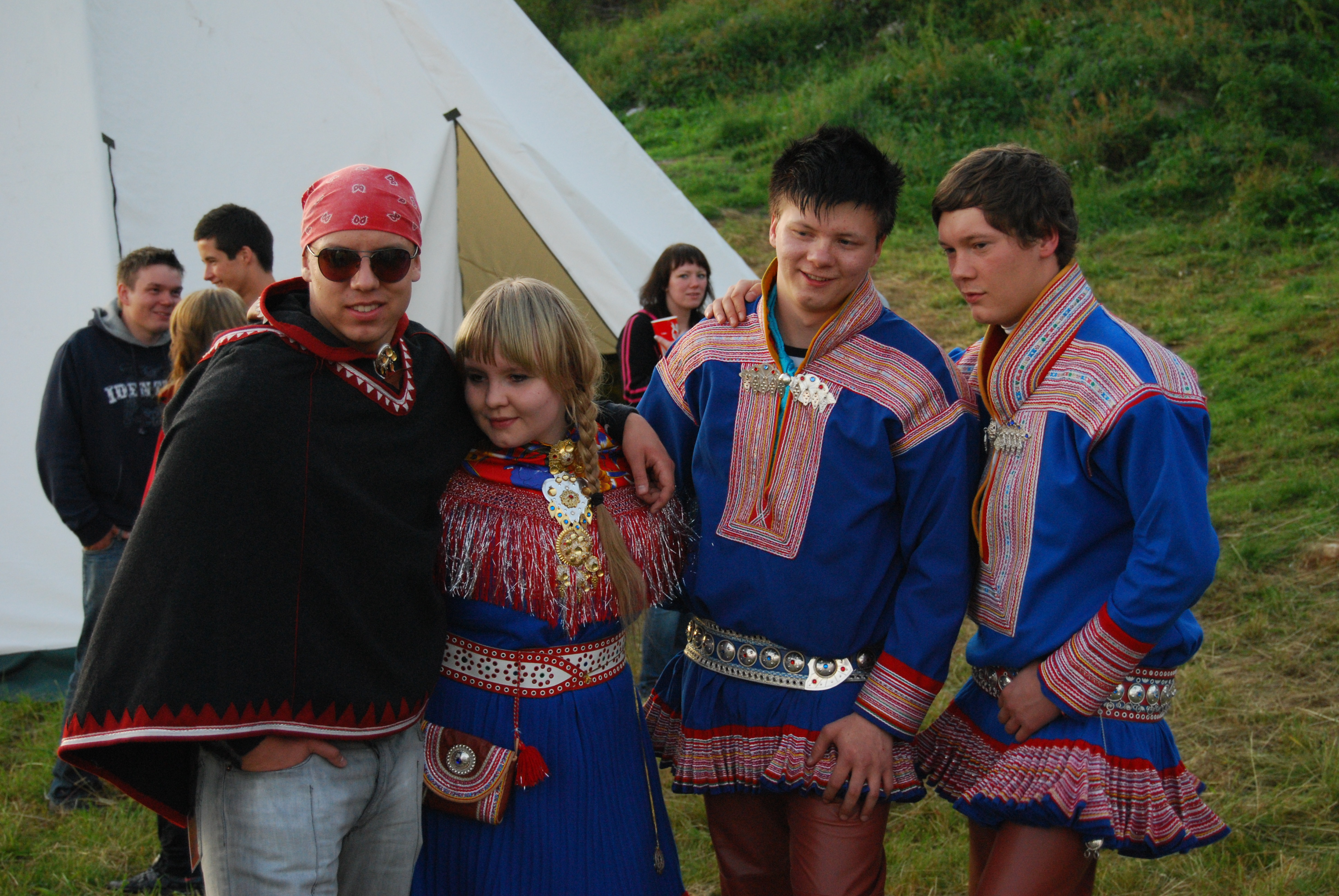
The musical group Duolva Duottar in traditional Sami dress. The man on the left, Fred Buljo, is wearing a luhkka. The woman and the other two men are wearing gákti.

The luhkka (North Sami luhkka) is an article of winter clothing that covers the top half of a person's body. It is a poncho-like hooded cape with the hem coming down to the wearer's elbow or wrist. Luhkka are made from thick wadmal. It is used by the Sami of northern Scandinavia and Finland and is traditionally worn on top of the Sami gákti or fur coat (beaska).

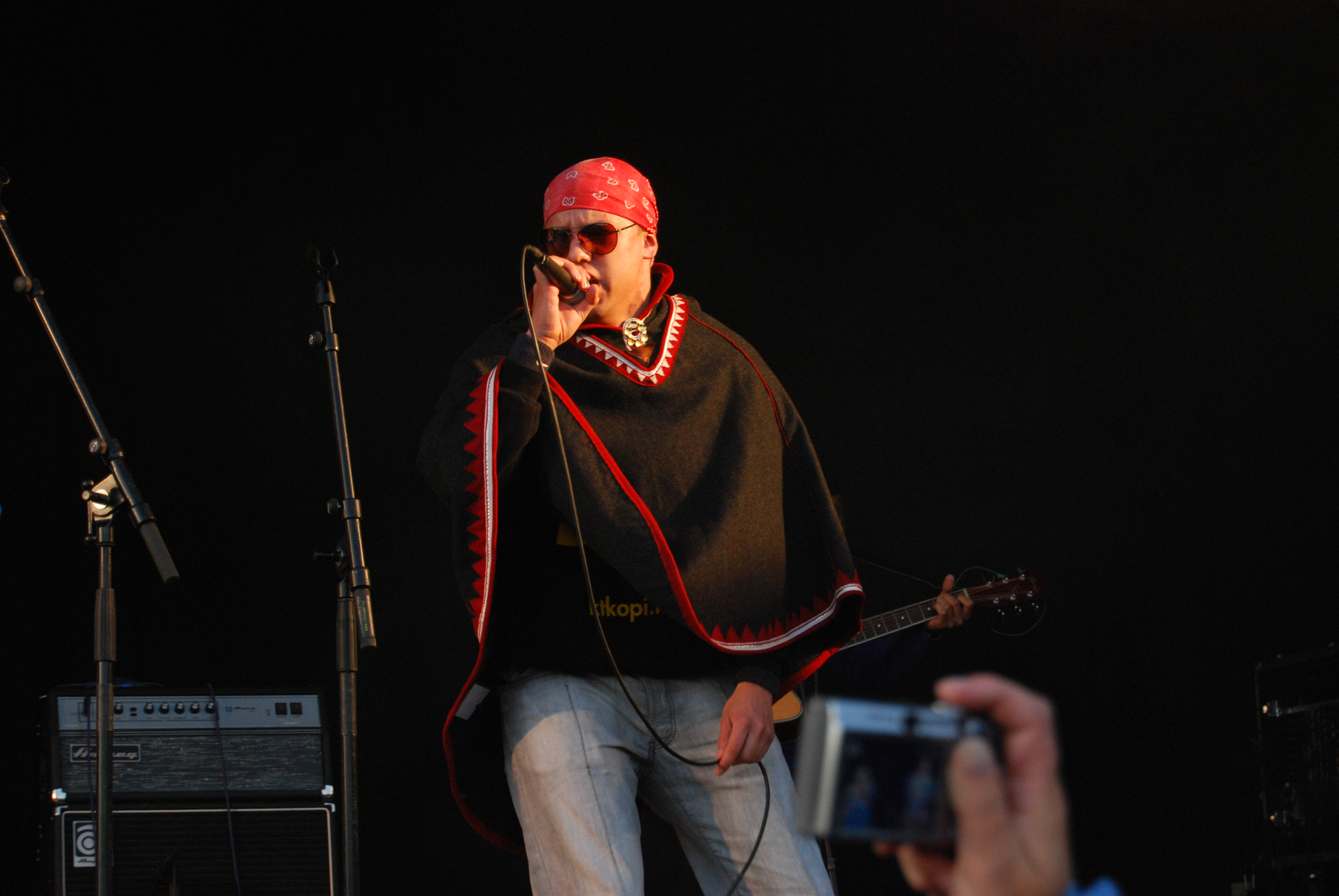
Fred Buljo wearing the traditional Sami luhkka

== Sources ==
- Desiree Koslin (2010), "Sámi", Berg Encyclopedia of World Dress and Fashion, vol. 8 – West Europe. Part 7: Nordic Countries, pp. 345–349, doi:10.2752/BEWDF/EDch8057, ISBN 978-1-84788-857-0
- Luhkka, Maritex Gávpi, archived from the original on 2010-08-23
