= Alta controversy =

Protests in Finnmark, Norway

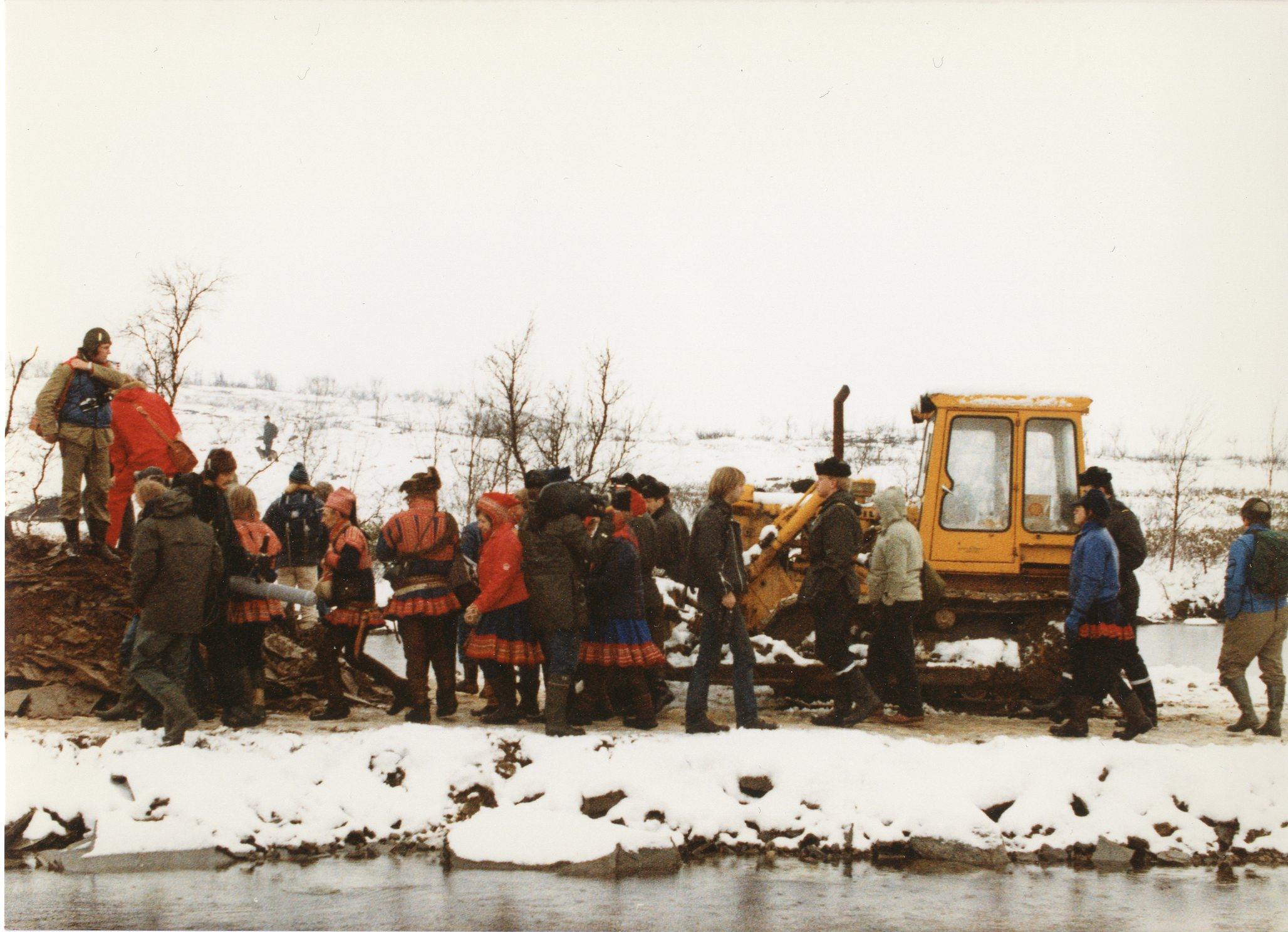
- Blockade against Alta hydroelectric project on traditional Sámi territories. The project was completed in 1987.
- Date: 1970 – 1982
- Location: Alta, Finnmark, Norway (hunger strikes held in Oslo and Stockholm)
- Caused by: Damming of the Alta River; Environmental and ecological damage of traditional Sámi territories
- Methods: Protests, civil disobedience, blockade, hunger strike
- Result: Alta Power Station is constructed: Some protesters arrested and fined; "Folkeaksjonen -" disassembled; Issues related to the Sámi's indigenous rights became a more important political agenda

Parties
Folkeaksjonen mot utbygging av Alta-Kautokeinovassdraget: 10 000 Protesters	Norwegian Government: Law enforcement

Arrests and fines
- Arrested: Alfred Nilsen; Tore Bongo; Svein Suhr; Per Flatberg
- Fined: kr 10,000–20,000

The Alta conflict or Alta controversy was a series of protests in Norway in the late 1970s and early 1980s against the construction of a hydroelectric power plant on the Alta River in Finnmark, Northern Norway.

== Timeline ==
- Inhabitants of the village of Máze rallied and formed Aksjonskomiteen mot neddemming av Masi (Action Committee Against the Damming of Masi) on 15 August 1970.
- Starting in 1973, the Altautvalget for bevaring av Alta-Kautokeino-vassdraget (Alta Committee for the Conservation of the Alta-Kautokeino River Basin) documented the detrimental effects of the project on salmon and "the nature" of the Alta river basin. The group is credited, in large part, for influencing the municipal council of Alta's opposition to the construction project.
- On 12 July 1978, about 80 protestors form Folkeaksjonen mot utbygging av Alta-Kautokeinovassdraget (People's Action Against the Development of the Alta-Kautokeino River Basin) assembled at Alta gymnas, the local high school.
- The Detsika Camp was established in the summer of 1979. It received 6,500 visitors from 20 nations; a number of the visitors were demonstrators.
- Later in 1979, the Stilla Camp was established and the Detsika Camp (which was a cultural gathering and a political workshop) was disestablished.
- Folkeaksjonen held an election at an ekstaordinær annual meeting in Alta on 24 January 1982, which concluded that the organization was to be disassembled. One of the reasons for disassembling the organization, was to avoid being blamed for sabotage and criminal acts, such as the arson that had taken place, in the previous Christmas holidays, against mobile constructions belonging to NVE.
- Folkeaksjonen held its last national conference in May 1982.
- Court proceedings against Alfred Nilsen (d. 2025), Tore Bongo, Svein Suhr and Per Flatberg began on 1 March 1983. They were later sentenced to fines of kr 10,000–20,000 each and suspended prison sentences of 60–90 days.

== History ==
The background for the controversy was a published plan by the Norwegian Water Resources and Energy Directorate (NVE) that called for the construction of a dam and hydroelectric power plant that would create an artificial lake and inundate the Sámi village of Máze. After the initial plan met political resistance, a less ambitious project was proposed that would cause less displacement of Sámi residents and less disruption for reindeer migration and wild salmon fishing.

On 12 July 1978, Folkeaksjonen mot utbygging av Alta-Kautokeinovassdraget (People's Action Against the Development of the Alta-Kautokeino River Basin) was founded, creating an organizational platform for first opposing and then resisting construction work. This group and others filed for an injunction in Norwegian courts against the Norwegian government to prevent construction from beginning.

On 1 May 1979, environmental minister Gro Harlem Brundtland wore a Sámi costume in inner Finnmark; "the opponents" of the construction of the dam in Alta viewed the performance as being tasteless for an environmental minister that had not been listening to Sámi interests.

In the fall of 1979, as construction was ready to start, protesters performed two acts of civil disobedience: at the construction site itself at Stilla, activists sat down on the ground and blocked the machines, and at the same time, Sámi activists began a hunger strike outside the Norwegian parliament.

Documents that have since been declassified show that the government planned to use military forces as logistical support for police authorities in their efforts to stop the protests.

The prime minister at the time, Odvar Nordli, pre-empted such an escalation by promising a review of the parliament's decision, but the Norwegian parliament subsequently confirmed its decision to dam the river. More than one thousand protesters chained themselves to the site when the work started again in January 1981. The police responded with large forces; at one point 10% of all Norwegian police officers were stationed in Alta (during which time they were quartered in a cruise ship). The protesters were forcibly removed by police.

For the first time since World War II, Norwegians were arrested and charged with violating laws against rioting. The central organizations for the Sámi people discontinued all cooperation with the Norwegian government. Two Sámi women travelled to Rome to petition the Pope.

The Supreme Court ruled in favor of the government in early 1982, at which point organized opposition to the power plant ceased, and construction of the Alta Hydroelectric Power Station was completed by 1987.

== Legacy ==
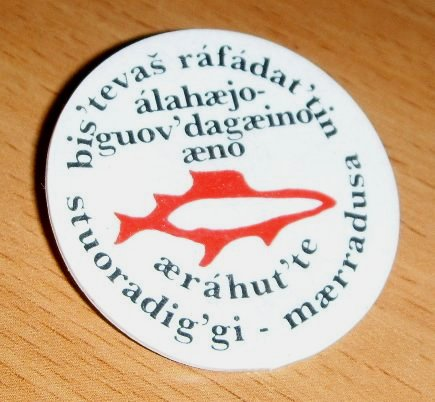
Sámi language button (campaign against development of the Alta)

As the first serious political upheaval since the debate about Norwegian EC membership in 1972, the Alta controversy was important in several ways:

- It put the rights of the Sámi as an indigenous people with distinct rights over the lands in Northern Norway onto the national political agenda. This process reached a key milestone in 2005, when the Finnmark Act was passed. It is considered that though the Sámi lost the battle over this particular issue, they made important long-term gains.
- It unified formerly disparate environmental groups with respect to a common cause.
- It revived Sámi interest in their culture and rolled back efforts of the Norwegian government's Norwegianization policy.

The NGO organised the opposition against the construction in the Alta controversy, and had at the most 20,000 members. Of these, 10,000 actively participated in demonstrations, including the Stilla March. The organisation functioned as a cooperation between environmentalists and Sámi activists, and not only succeeded in putting focus on environmental issues but also on Sámi rights.

After their acts of civil disobedience, the four leaders, Alfred Nilsen, Tore Bongo, Svein Suhr and Per Flatberg (information leader), were sentenced for encouraging illegal acts.

== Popular media ==
La elva leve! (Let the River Flow) was a 1980 Norwegian docudrama inspired by the events of the Alta protests. A 2023 film, Let the River Flow by Ole Giæver, is a newer rendition of this story.

In 2014, in "one scene of the Donald Duck Christmas story, mining activists—clad in gákti—and a chain gang show up. Associations to the Alta conflict of the 1970s and '80s, where there was great resistance to the building of a dam on the Alta River, are clear", according to NRK. A documentary film Tidsvitne: Alta-kampen ("The Alta Struggle" episode of the series Tidsvitne) was produced by NRK.

A subplot in the 2019 animated musical film Frozen II where a dam built on tribal land by King Runeard, Elsa and Anna's grandfather, alludes to the Alta controversy. In the film, Runeard had the dam built ostensibly as a gift to the Northuldra—a fictional tribe inspired by the Sámi people—but was actually a means to further subjugate the tribe whom the king distrusted for their reliance on magic–in an allusion to efforts to supplant Sámi shamanism.

== See also ==
- Environmental racism in Europe

== Literature ==
- Norwegian Ministry of Foreign Affairs The Sámi in Norway
- Bård Berg: 25 år i skyttergravene? Fra kampen om Alta/Kautokeino-vassdraget til Bondevik-regjeringens forslag til Finnmarkslov (in Norwegian)
