= ČSV =

Sámi political slogan

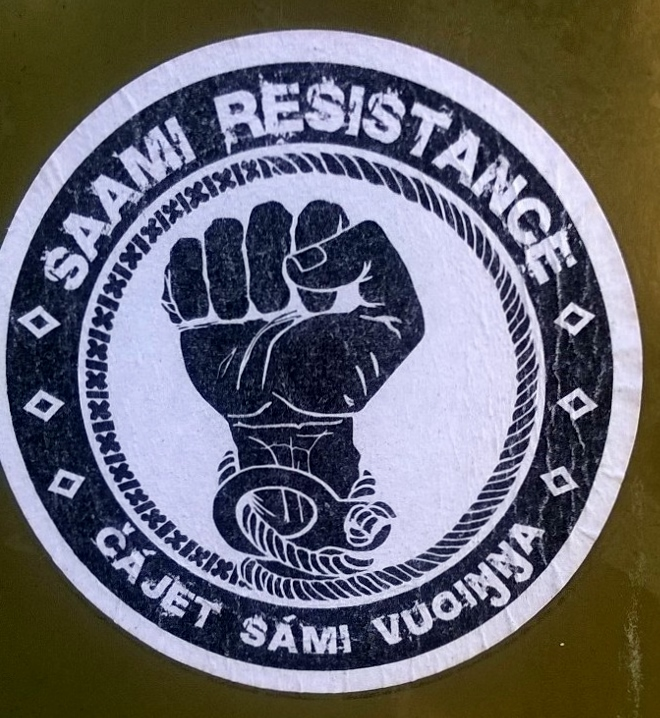
A ČSV badge

ČSV is an initialism used to promote Sámi identity and activism. The three letters are the most commonly used in Sámi languages. The combination of the three letters is explained as a play with word, meaning that it can stand for a variety of meanings. ČSV is commonly associated with meanings such as Čájet Sámi Vuoiŋŋa! (Show Sámi Spirit), Čiegus sámi veahka! (Secret Sámi Helper or Hidden Sámi Strength), Čohkkejehket sámiid vuitui! (Gather for Victory) and Čielga Sámi Varra! (Pure Sámi Blood).

== History ==
In the early 1970s, Sámi activists adopted ČSV as a watchword similar to how the American Indian Movement and the Black Panthers used the phrases "Red Power" and "Black Power" respectively. ČSV did not represent a group, but more of an idea that minority groups should take a more confrontational stance in demanding change.

Johan Jernsletten is credited with coming up with the purposefully vague acronym during the protests in Máze, Norway in 1970, saying that it stood for Čiegus Sámi Viehka. Although the phrase originated among the Northern Sámi community in Finnmark, Norway, it soon spread across Sápmi and to other Sámi language groups.

In general, someone who works actively to support the Sámi community has been referred to a ČSV. As an ethnocultural movement, ČSV has been associated with a certain style, including wearing gáktis, nutukas, tin-thread embroidery, and the Sami colors, as one of the goals of ČSV is to make Sámi culture and identity visible.

== Artists ==
While the origin of ČSV was political, it soon became a cultural identifier drawing the attention of authors and artists. In 1972, participants at a Sirma, Norway, cultural seminar to promote Sámi literature were tasked with writing what ČSV meant for them as part of an exercise to encourage Sámi to write about Sámi experiences. The literary anthology Čállagat launched out of this seminar, publishing 16 issues and featuring many first-time Sámi authors. A number of issues of Čállagat featured poems with words containing the letters ČSV.

In 2013, Kildin Sámi photographer Sergey Gavrilov asked Sámi youth to repeat the ČSV exercise for an exhibition at the Sami Center for Contemporary Art in Kárášjohka, Norway. In 2014, the play ČSV-Republihkka explored the idea of a unified, independent Sápmi and how different Sámi communities and languages might engage with one another and the world.

== Interpretation ==
Expressing the meaning of ČSV for many is an exercise in creativity, demonstrating the adaptability of the Sámi people and languages. Common meanings include:

- Čájet Sámi Vuoiŋŋa! (Show Sámi Spirit!)
- Čohkke Sámiid Vuitui! (Sámi Unite for Victory!)
- Čállet Sámi Verddet! (Write, Sámi friends!)
- Čielga Sámi Varra! (Clear Sámi Blood)
