= Four Winds hat =

Traditional hat of the Sámi people

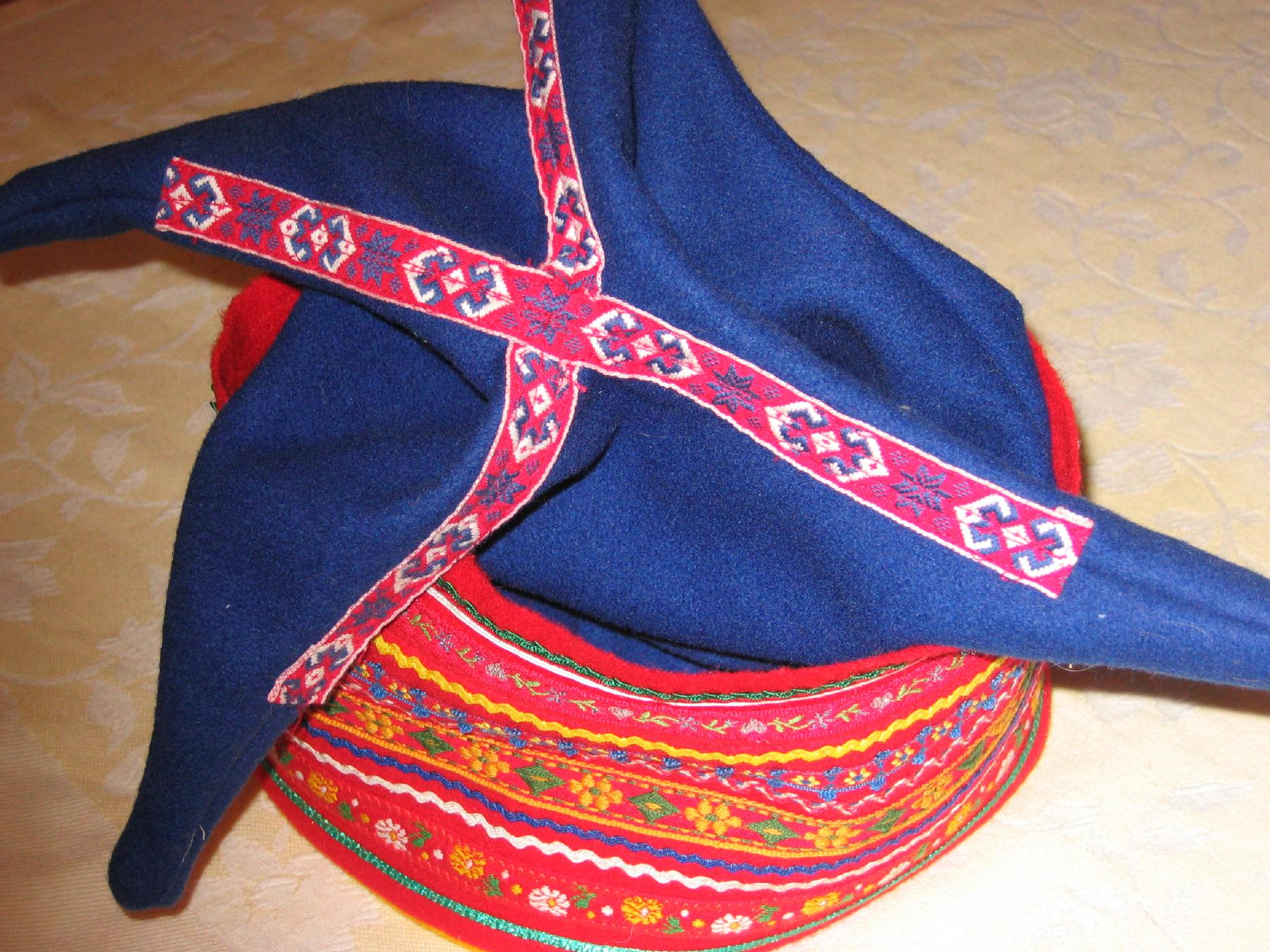
Four Winds hat

The Four Winds hat (Northern Sámi: čiehgahpir) is one version of traditional man's hat of the Sámi. The basis is a simple blue cylinder, decorated with a band with braid patterns, but the top is a large, four-cornered star, colored bright blue with parts bright red and yellow. The decoration in an actual Sámi hat is, like the rest of the Sami garb, indicative of the person's place of origin or even his clan or marital status, a little like the Scottish tartan.

== Description ==
The hat is four-cornered to represent the four corners of the earth, which the early Sámi believed to be square. Traditionally, the hat was blue to represent the sky and had white, yellow, or red trim. The corners were stuffed with down for warmth and to allow the hat to keep its shape. Small items could also be stored in the corners of the hat.

== History ==
The top of the Sámi hat was a bit exaggerated and the hat decorated with the traditional bright-colored embroidery to produce the Four Winds hat.

Today, the hat is a common souvenir for visitor to the Laplands, which scholar Maaria Niskala cites as an example of how Sáminess is 'othered' in promotional tourism materials.

== See also ==
- List of hat styles
