= Gákti =

Piece of traditional Sámi clothing

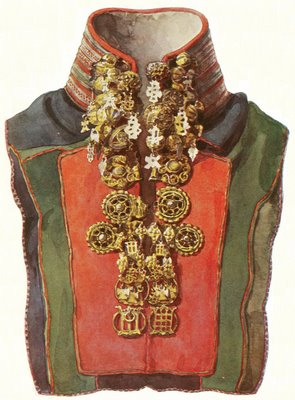
A goldwork collar of a traditional Sámi woman's gákti. This gákti has a metal embroidery collar with pewter or silver thread and traditional Sámi silver buckles.

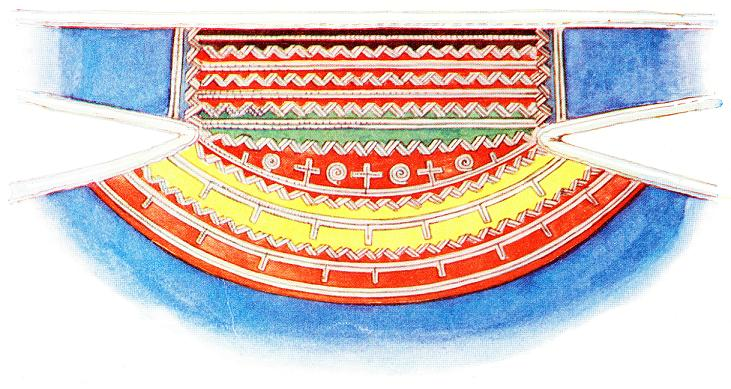
A pattern of a metal embroidered collar for a traditional male Sámi gákti from Åsele, Västerbotten, Sweden. The metal thread most commonly used for the embroidery is Pewter.

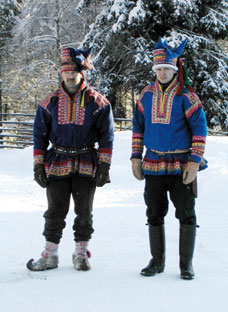
Non-traditional imitation gákti in Rovaniemi.

Gákti is a Northern Sámi term for a type of coat worn by the Sámi in northern areas of Norway, Sweden, Finland and the Kola Peninsula in Russia. The gákti is worn both in ceremonial contexts and while working, particularly when herding reindeer. The traditional Sami outfit is characterized by a dominant color adorned with bands of contrasting colours, plaits, pewter embroidery, tin art, and often a high collar.

== Characteristics ==
The colours, patterns and decorations of the costume can signify a person's marital status and geographical origin. There are different gákti for women and men; men's gáktis are shorter at the hem than women's. Traditionally the gákti was made from reindeer skin, but in modern times, wool, cotton or silk are more common. The gákti can be worn with a belt (pleated, quilted or with silver buttons), silver jewellery, traditional leather footwear and a silk scarf. Traditionally, if the buttons on the belt are square, it shows the wearer is married. If they are round, the person is unmarried.

== In other Sámi languages ==
"Gákti" is the Northern Sámi term for the clothing. The following terms in other Sami languages do not refer to the Northern Sami gákti, but to their own clothing:

- South Sámi: gaeptie/gapta/gåptoe
- Ume Sámi: gápttie
- Pite Sámi: gáppte, gåppto
- Lule Sámi: gáppte/gábdde
- Inari Sámi: mááccuh
- Skolt Sámi: määccaǩ
- Kildin Sámi: ма̄цэх/юххьп/юппа
- Ter Sámi: mā͕ᵈtsa͕ᵍ

== Imitation gákti ==
Non-traditional imitation gákti can be found in the European Arctic and elsewhere as a form of cultural appropriation. The tourist industry of Rovaniemi, Finland, a popular Arctic destination with an overwhelmingly ethnically Finnish population, has faced particular criticism for this practice. In 2008, hundreds of Sámi activists and sympathisers gathered to protest imitation gákti and other appropriations of Sámi culture in Rovaniemi.

== See also ==
- Four winds hat
- Luhkka
- Beaska
