= Sámi politics =

Politics concerning the Sámi ethnic group

Sámi politics refers to politics that concern the Sámi ethnic group in Norway, Sweden, Finland and Russia. In a more narrow sense, it has come to indicate the government of Sámi affairs by Sámi political institutions. This article deals with Sámi political structures, with an emphasis on the contemporary institutions.

== Pre-parliamentarian Sámi politics ==
=== Nomadic times ===
Originally, the Sámi were semi-nomadic – moving between fixed settlements as the seasons passed. Several groups would often join up in the winter, making winter settlements (Northern Sami: dálvvadis) larger and more diverse than the spring, summer and autumn settlements (the báiki). In several dálvvadis, such as Jåhkamåhkke, large winter markets were established and towns grew up.

==== The "Finnekonger" ====
Norse sources from the 12th century and onwards, such as Heimskringla and Volundarkvida, talk about finnekonger ("Sámi kings"), which in contemporary history writing are interpreted as particularly wealthy Sámi, who were perhaps also chieftains. Archeological findings do indeed confirm that a certain degree of class society arose among the Sámi, due to the fur trade, in the early Middle Ages. Little is known about the formal status of the finnekonger, however. The name is in any case misleading, as nobility has never been a part of Sámi culture.

==== The Siida system ====
From old, the term siida refers to a unit of people who travel together and/or share a seasonal settlement. Väinö Tanner's early 20th-century account of the workings in this polity refer to it as "primitive communism", as there was an extensive sharing of goods and land – though certain parts of the land was private, and not common to the siida's members. Norraz, a meeting of all households' leaders, served as parliament, government and court.

Other sources speak of siida-isids, people who were primus inter pares in the union of households. This person may be simply the head of the wealthiest or otherwise most successful household, a natural leader or even elected by the council of families. They are sometimes referred to simply as "village elders".

Elements of the siida system have survived among the Sámi who turned to reindeer herding and have remained semi-nomadic to this day. Most Sámi, though, gradually settled down in villages from the middle of the 16th century. Reindeer herding and settlement in villages were different strategies aimed at countering the same problem: the extinction of undomesticated reindeer, which had been a key source of income for the nomadic groups.

=== The Division of Sápmi (13th century – 1945s) ===
The Nordic states and the state of Novgorod soon began expanding northwards, dividing Sámi lands into spheres of interest. A system of joint taxation was established for parts of the Sámi area, so that, for example, the Sámi between the Lyngen Alps and the White Sea needed to pay taxes to both Norway/Denmark–Norway and Novgorod/Grand Duchy of Moscow/Tsardom of Russia. After the Time of Troubles and Kalmar War the borders became more concrete. In some areas, the Sámi still had to pay double taxes, though. The 18th century saw a further division of Sámi lands between Denmark–Norway and Sweden. The final agreement led to the creation of the Lapp Codicil of 1751 which admitted some rights to the indigenous people. Following the Napoleonic Wars, Norway was transferred from Denmark to Sweden, while Finland went from Sweden to Russia. This meant a transfer of most of the Sámi population from one sovereign to another. In 1826 the land border between Sweden–Norway and the Russian Empire in the northeast was finalized. While originally the siidas that were cut in two were to keep their rights on both sides of the border; this only lasted until Finland became sovereign and in 1920 got the Soviet Union's border regions with Norway. Norway then made an agreement with Finland, causing the split siidas to lose their now 'Norwegian' lands. Following World War II, Finland lost the territories between Norway and the Soviet Union, leaving the borders as they are presently.

=== Early modern Sámi political organizing (c. 19th century – 1950) ===
==== Russian Empire ====
In the mid-19th century, Tsar Alexander II of Russia initiated wide-ranging reforms in a democratic direction. During these reforms an assembly for the Sámi population was established on the Russian side of Sápmi in 1868, the Kola Sobbar. This assembly met annually in Kola to debate and even decide certain issues of relevance to the indigenous people. It is unknown when the Kola Sobbar stopped functioning, but it did not survive the Russian Revolution.

==== Nordic countries ====
In the late 19th and early 20th centuries, a movement started in Norway's Finnmark and Troms counties to save Sámi culture and language. Central people in these attempts were Per Fokstad and Isak Saba, both Coast Sámi. They were both activists in the Labour Party, which was one of the movements in Norway most positive to the Sámi cause at the time. Saba became the first Sámi elected to a national parliament in 1907. His poem Sámi soga lávlla" would later be set to music and declared the official 'Song of the Sámi people'. In 1917, the first international Sámi conference took place in Trondheim, gathering North and South Sámi from Norway and Sweden. Two of the most important leaders in this movement were Elsa Laula Renberg and Daniel Mortensson, both South Sámi. This meeting to a large degree debated the problems of reindeer herding, and was important for the further development of the reindeer herding Sámi's organizing. It also holds great symbolic value for the Sámi per se, and the official 'Sámi People's Day' was set to February 6, the date when the meeting began, to commemorate the occasion.

=== The Sámi Council and grass roots struggle (1950s–1980s) ===
The Sámi Council was founded during the 2nd Sámi Conference held in Karasjok, Norway on August 18, 1956, as the Nordic Saami Council.

== The Parliamentary structures ==
Modern Sámi politics are mainly based on the Sámi Parliaments (Northern Sami: Sámediggi, Lule Sami: Sámedigge, Southern Sami: Saemiedigkie, Kildin Sami: Са̄мь Соббар, Skolt Sami: Sää´mte´ǧǧ, Inari Sami: Sämitigge). These are representative bodies for peoples of Sámi heritage in Finland, Sweden and Norway, and effort to establish a recognized Sámi Parliament in Russia is ongoing. The Sámi Parliaments also have a common political framework, the Sámi Parliamentary Council, whose members are appointed by the Saami Council, a pan-Sápmi NGO.

=== Finland ===
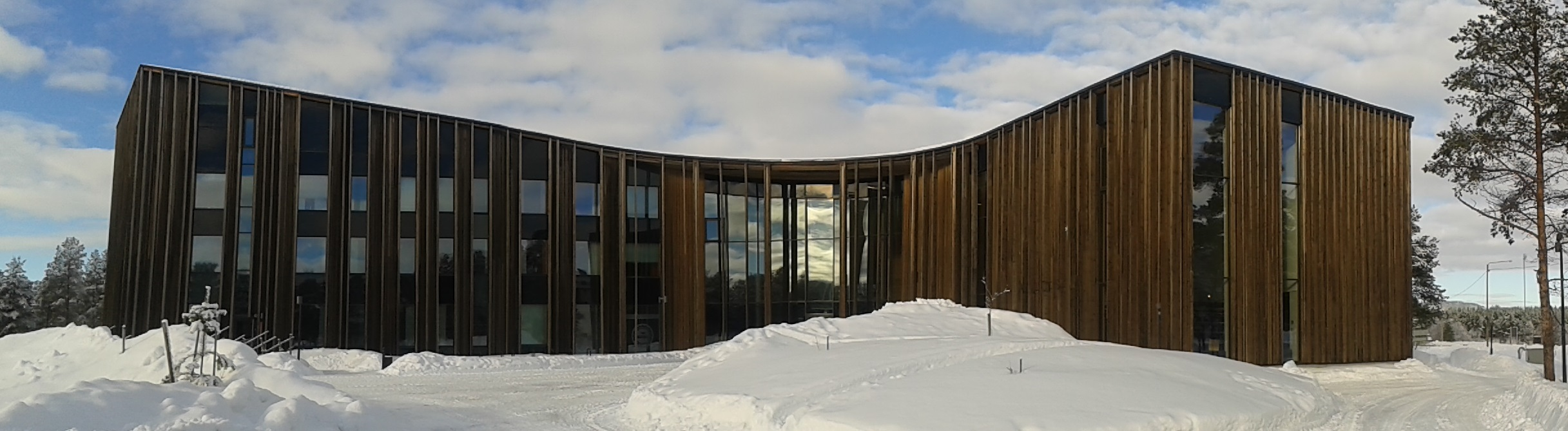
Sajos Sámi cultural and administrative centre in Inari, Finland

The Sámi Parliament of Finland was established on 2 March 1996; however, it was based on an elected "Sámi delegation" that preceded all the other Sámi parliaments and inspired their creation. The parliament is situated in Aanaar (Inari). It currently has 21 representatives, who are elected every four years by direct vote from the municipalities in the Sami Domicile Area.

=== Norway ===
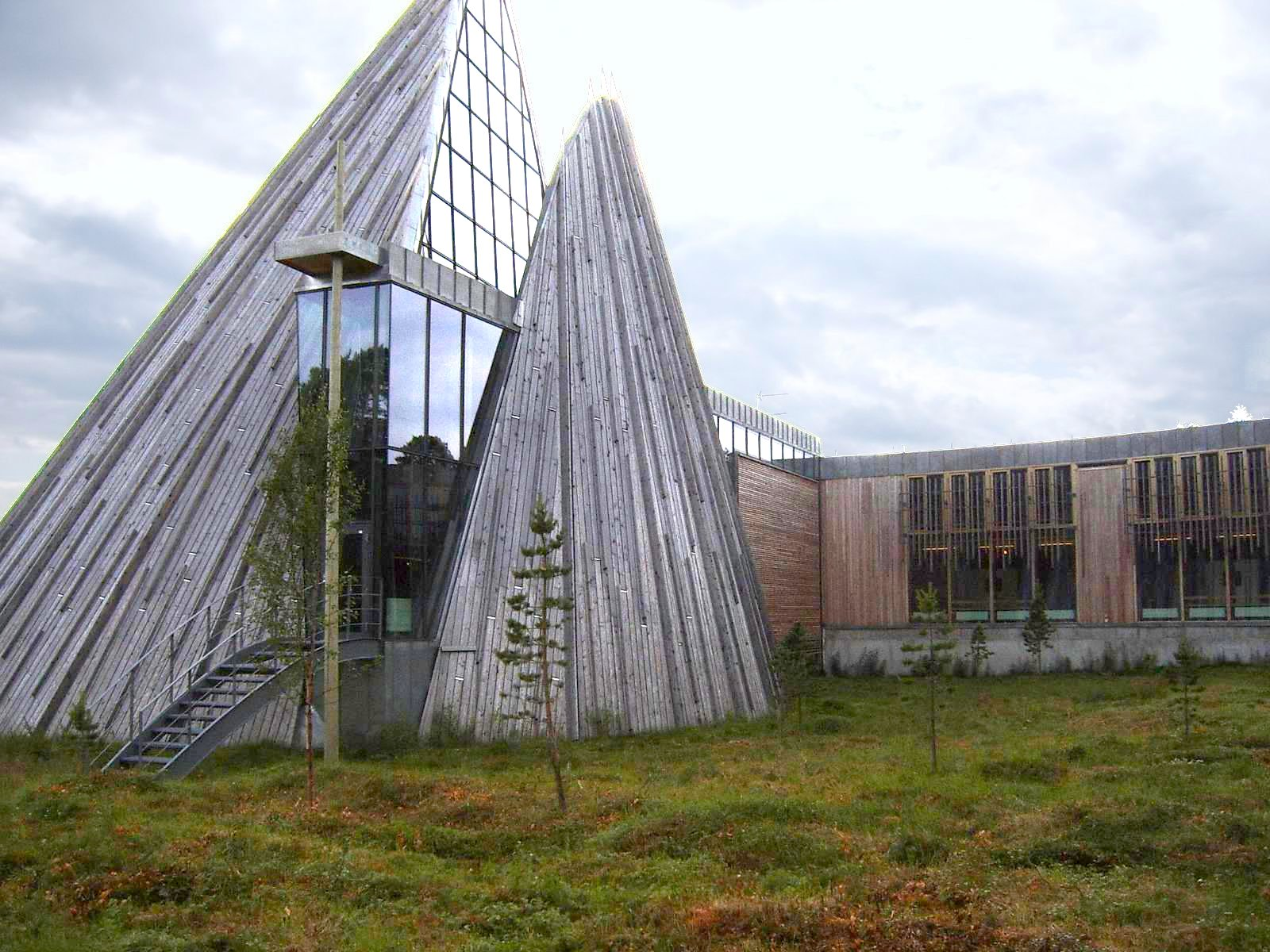
Sámi Parliament of Norway

The Sámi Parliament of Norway was established on 9 October 1989 in Kárášjohka (Karasjok). It currently has 39 representatives, who are elected every four years by direct vote from seven constituencies: Nuortaguovlu (Eastern region), Ávjovarri (Steep Mountain), Davveguovlu (North region), Gáiseguovlu (Mountainous region), Viestarmearra (Western Sea), Åarjiel-Saepmie (South Sápmi) and Lulli-Norga (South Norway). Unlike in Finland, the constituencies cover all of Norway — the Lulli-Norga district encompasses all of Norway outside of Sápmi.

=== Sweden ===
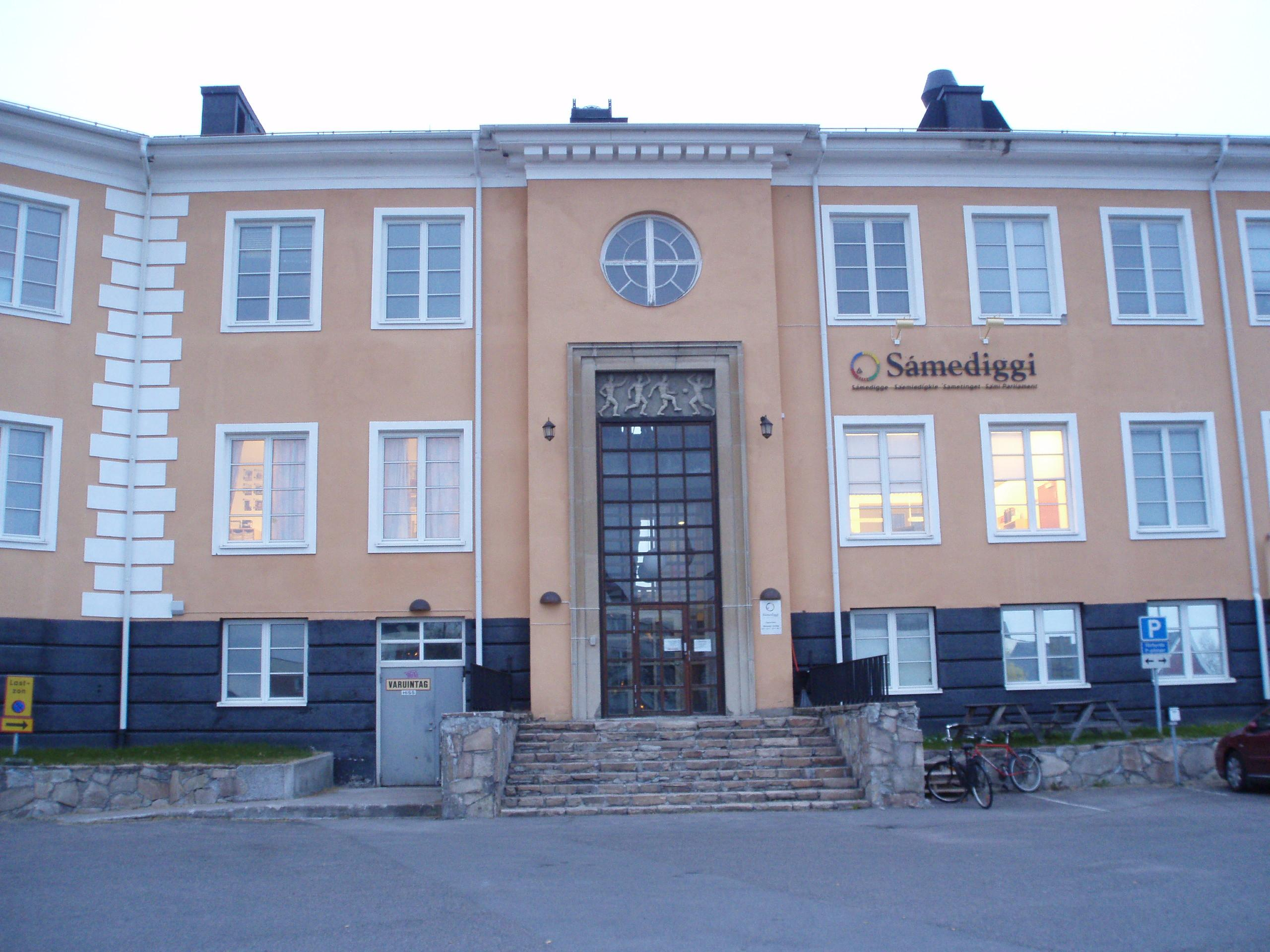
Sami Parliament of Sweden

The Sami Parliament of Sweden was established on 26 August 1993 in Giron (Kiruna). It has 31 representatives, elected every four years by general vote. The parliament is run by the Swedish Riksdag, therefore its actions must comply with decisions of the Riksdag, which sometimes go against the elected Sámi Parliament's members' party programs.

=== Russia ===
The Kola Sámi Assembly was established on 12 December 2010 in Murmansk. In 2012, representatives from Russian Sámi organizations visited the Norwegian Sámi Parliament in Kárášjohka to learn more about its structure and operations. As of 2017, the Kola Sámi Assembly was not recognised as a legislative body ("parliament") by the Russian federal nor local Murmansk Oblast governments under the pretext of "combatting separatism" and remains a purely representative organ with unclear relations with the government.

There is a parallel structure, a public organization, Kola Sámi Association, within the Russian Association of Indigenous Peoples of the North (RAIPON) and, together with the Association of Sámi in Murmansk Oblast, a member association of the Saami Council.

=== The Sámi Parliamentary Conference and Council ===
Since 2005, the parliaments have been united through the Conference of Sámi Parliamentarians. In this triennial meeting, a plenary of Sámi parliamentarians from Finland, Norway, Sweden, and Russia meet to discuss issues facing Sámi throughout Sápmi regardless of national borders. Between sessions, the Sámi Parliamentary Council, with members appointed by the Saami Council, operates.

== The Presidents ==
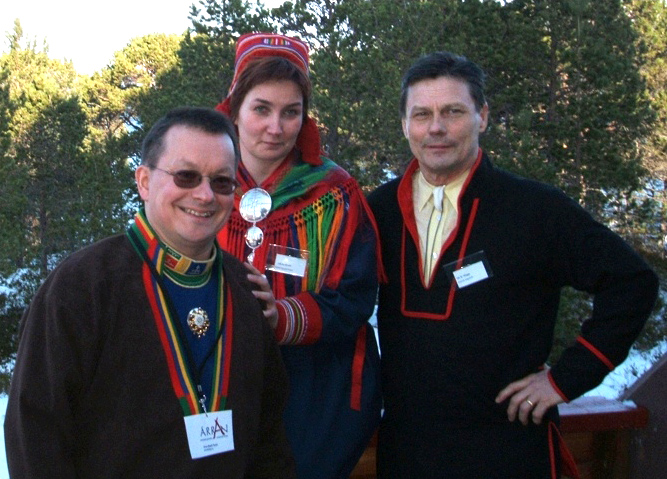
The three first Sámi Presidents of Norway

The contemporary leaders of the Sámi people are the Sámi presidents. Each Sámi Parliament elects a President among their own numbers, so the Sámi political system today could be considered a cooperation between parliamentary democracies which are part of three sovereign states.

The Sámi Presidents cooperate through annual meetings, where the ministers responsible for Sámi affairs in Finland, Norway and Sweden also take part. These meetings are organized through the Nordic Council of Ministers. The formal leadership of the Sámi Parliamentary Council rotates between the Presidents.

=== The Finnish side ===
Current president on the Finnish side of Sápmi is Tuomas Aslak Juuso.

=== The Norwegian side ===
Current President in Norway is Silje Karine Muotka, who took office in October 2021. She represents the Norwegian Sami Association.

=== The Swedish side ===
The chairman of the Board is also called the President of the Sami parliament. The current president is Per Olof Nutti.

=== The Russian side ===
The committee to establish a Sámi Parliament in Russia, the Council of Plenipotentiary Representatives is headed by Kildin Sámi Valentina Sovkina from the Kola Sámi Association. There is also a parallel committee of Sami people elected by the regional authorities, headed by Kildin Sámi Lyubov' Vatonena.

== See also ==
- Swedish Assembly of Finland
- ČSV
