= Saami Council =

Non-governmental organization of the Saami people

Coordinates: 69°53′45″N 27°00′52″E

- Saamelaisneuvosto (Finnish); Sämirääđi (Inari Sami); Са̄мь Соббар (Kildin Sami); Sámeráde (Lule Sami); Sámiráđđi (Northern Sami); Samerådet (Norwegian); Союз саамов (Russian); Sámerárre (Pite Sami); Sääʹmsuåvtõs (Skolt Sami); Saemienraerie (Southern Sami); Samerådet (Swedish)
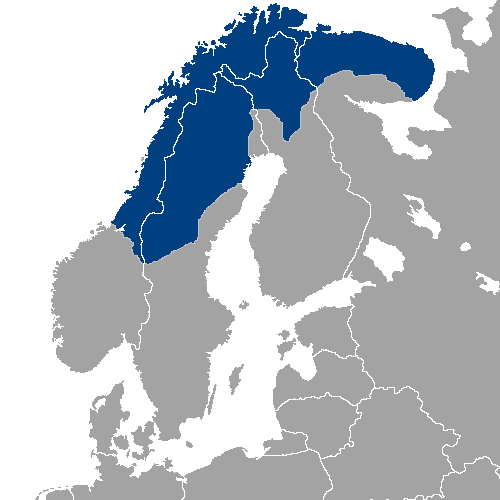
- Formation: 1956
- Type: NGO
- Location: Kárášjohka, Norway
- Region served: Sápmi
- Fields: Indigenous rights
- Members: 9 organizations
- Main organ: Saami Conference
- Affiliations: Arctic Council
- Website: saamicouncil.net
- Formerly called: Nordic Saami Council

The Saami Council is a voluntary, non-governmental organization of the Sámi people made up of nine Sámi member organizations from Finland, Norway, Russia, and Sweden. Since the founding of the Nordic Saami Council in 1956, among the first indigenous peoples' organizations, the Saami Council has actively dealt with Sámi public policy tasks. In 1992, when Russian Sámi groups joined the council, "Nordic" was removed from the council's name. The secretary was previously sited in both Helsinki and Utsjoki, Finland, but is now in Kárášjohka, Norway. The Saami Council is funded by a range of grants, and its engagements are based on decisions, statements, declarations, and political programs from the Saami Conference held every four years.

== Purpose ==
The purposes of the Saami Council are to:

- promote and safeguard Sámi rights and interest;
- consolidate the feeling of affinity among the Sámi people;
- attain recognition for the Sámi as one people and an indigenous people;
- maintain the cultural, political, economic and social rights of the Sámi in the legislation of the four states and in agreements between states and Sámi representative organizations

The Saami Council actively works to promote Sámi cultural, political, economic, civil, social and spiritual rights and interests by providing statements and proposals regarding Sámi in the four nations. Beyond this, they exercise influence on behalf of Sámi by participating in international processes related to indigenous peoples around the world, human rights, Arctic and environmental issues and it holds status as permanent participant to the Arctic Council. Further, the organization is represented in the Arctic Council Indigenous Peoples Secretariat (IPS) and the Lásságámmi Foundation, and it holds observer status at the Barents Euro-Arctic Council Working Group of Indigenous Peoples (WGIP) and the United Nations Economic and Social Council (ECOSOC). As there is no state-recognized Sámi Parliament in Russia at present, the Russian association members of the Saami Council are given a seat in the Saami Parliamentary Council (SPR), which is basically a cooperating forum for the Sámi parliaments.

The Saami Council emphasizes international collaboration among indigenous peoples' organizations around the world, and holds a particularly close relationship to the Inuit Circumpolar Council (ICC), which represents the Inuit, Yupik, and Chukchi of Alaska, Canada, Greenland, and Chukotka (Russia).

The Saami Council is engaging in issues related to the Arctic and the environment with the goal of supporting sustainable management to ensure both the environment and natural resources, as well as Saami livelihoods, for the future. They state that healthy and productive ecosystems are preconditions for the culture and identity of the Sámi.

== Organization ==
The Saami Conference is the highest organ of the Saami Council. It consists of 72 delegates, all of them representing one of the nine member organizations in Finland, Norway, Sweden, and Russia. The conference is held every fourth year and some of the tasks are to confirm the Saami Council's business report and accounting for the previous period, as well as processing resolutions for new issues and a new declaration for the Saami Council.

At the first Saami Conference, which was held in Jokkmokk, Sweden, in 1953, was appointed a working committee supposed to prepare the establishment of the Saami Council. This establishment found place during the second conference in Kárášjohka in 1956. Other decision made at the Saami Conferences are the Sámi flag, "Sámi soga lávlla" the Sámi anthem, and the Sámi National Day.

The Saami Council consists of 15 members from the member organizations. The members are appointed by the Saami Conference. The Saami Council usually gathers twice a year and is chaired by a president selected for a period of two years.

The Saami Council's and Conference's work have been of significant importance for the Sámi peoples' status and organization, and also poses an important platform for communication and cooperation in Sámi society. The Saami Council has gained a position in international forums.

The Executive Board is formed by the president in addition to one vice president from each country. Their job is to lead the organization and perform the tasks given by the Saami Council.

The Cultural Committee consists of five members, of which four are proposed from Sámi arts and culture organizations and one from the Saami Council. The members are supposed to pose a wide representation of the range of arts and culture branches. The aim for their function is to promote a comprehensive Sámi cultural politic and to preserve, challenge and promote Sámi society and culture initiatives. The Saami Council is working on strengthening traditional and modern Sámi culture, in particular through providing a funding scheme funded by the Nordic Council of Ministers. The Culture Committee is responsible for this scheme. Culture projects working in a pan-Sápmi perspective are prioritized in accordance to the Saami Council's purpose of unifying the Sámi people.

The administration consists of a secretariat chaired by a general secretary appointed by the Saami Council, and of following units:

- The Cultural Unit
- The Human Rights Unit
- The Arctic and Environmental Unit
- The EU Unit

== Saami Conferences ==
21 Saami Conferences are held since the establishment in 1953, and for each one is made a new declaration for the Saami Council. The year and location of the conferences were:

1. Jokkmokk, 1953
2. Kárášjohka, 1956
3. Inari, 1959
4. Kiruna, 1962
5. Tana bru, 1965
6. Hetta, 1968
7. Gällivare, 1971
8. Snåsa, 1974
9. Inari, 1976
10. Arjeplog, 1978
11. Tromsø, 1980
12. Utsjoki, 1983
13. Åre, 1986
14. Lakselv, 1989
15. Helsinki, 1992
16. Murmansk, 1996 (Murmanskdeklarasjonen)
17. Kiruna, 2000 (Kirunadeklarasjonen)
18. Honningsvåg, 2004 (Honningsvågdeklarasjonen)
19. Rovaniemi, 2008 (Rovaniemideklarasjonen)
20. Murmansk, 2013
21. Trondheim, 2017 (Tråantedeklarasjonen)
22. Gällivare, 2022

== Member organizations ==
In order to become a member organization, the organization has to join the purpose of the Saami Council's existence. As of 2020, nine organizations are members of the Saami Council:

- Reindeer Herders Association of Sweden (BEO)
- Kola Sámi Association (AKS)
- Association of Sámi in Murmansk Oblast (OOSMO)
- Sami Reindeer Herders' Association of Norway (NBL)
- Norwegian Sámi Association (NSR)
- National Association Same Ätnam (RSÄ)
- People's Federation of the Saami (SFF)
- National Union of the Swedish Sámi People (SSR)
- Sámi Central Association (SSG)

== Prizes and awards ==
The Saami Council's Honorary Award is given to a person, organization, association or institution that is considered to have contributed to the strengthening of the Sámi peoples togetherness and fellowship, and to helping Sámi safeguard their traditions, livelihoods, mindsets, languages and other non-materialistic traditions. Among others, the prize has been awarded to Áillohaš, Ole Henrik Magga, and Mari Boine.

The Saami Council Literature Prize is awarded every second year and is the only one of its kind. The purpose of the prize is to motivate Sámi writers to produce Sámi literature through giving them recognition and rise the attention for their book releases. The prize is awarded to books with Sámi as the main language, sometimes also to books translated to into minority Sámi languages. Among others, it has been awarded to Iraida Vinogradova, Stig Gælok, and Siri Broch Johansen.

== See also ==
- Sámi Parliament of Norway
- Sámi Parliament of Finland
- Sámi Parliament of Sweden
- Arctic cooperation and politics
- Climate change in the Arctic
