= Sámi flag =

Ethnic flag

Sami flag
- Use: Civil flag and ensign
- Proportion: 75:101
- Adopted: 15 August 1986
- Designed by: Astrid Båhl

The Sámi flag (Note: Inari Sami: Säämi lippu; Northern Sami: Sámi leavga; Lule Sami: Sáme slávggá; Skolt Sami: Sääʹm lipp; Southern Sami: Saemien saevege; Kildin Sami: Са̄мь флаг) is the flag of Sápmi and the Sámi people, one of the Indigenous peoples of the Nordic countries and the Kola Peninsula of the Russian Federation.

== First Sámi flag ==
The first, unofficial Sámi flag

The first, unofficial Sámi flag was designed by Sami politician and activist Marit Stueng from Kárašjohka in 1962, using a blue, red, and yellow color pattern commonly used on gákti, the traditional Sámi garb. The design was used locally in Kárašjohka as a flag, as well as in publications such as Kátalåga 1971. Kátalåga 1971 was published in 1972 by the Karasjok Library for Sámi Literature, and the cover was designed by Nils Viktor Aslaksen. With the growth of Sámi activism and the ČSV movement, several proposals for a Sámi flag were developed, although none gained prominence until the Alta controversy.

In 1977, as the protests in Alta Municipality over a dam on the river Altaelva grew, Sámi artist Synnøve Persen from Porsáŋggu Municipality made the artworks "Forslag til Samisk flagg" (Blueprint for a Sámi Flag) and "Sámiland for Sámi", both of which used a design similar to Stueng's flag. Persen credited other Nordic flags and traditional Sámi designs for her proposal. Despite the earlier origin of Stueng's flag, Persen's work gained notice and became a symbol of the Alta protests. Persen's artworks were acquired by the National Museum in 2018, after being featured locally and internationally in multiple media and exhibitions; it is usually introduced as "the first Sámi flag" without reference to Marit Stueng.

== Second Sámi flag ==
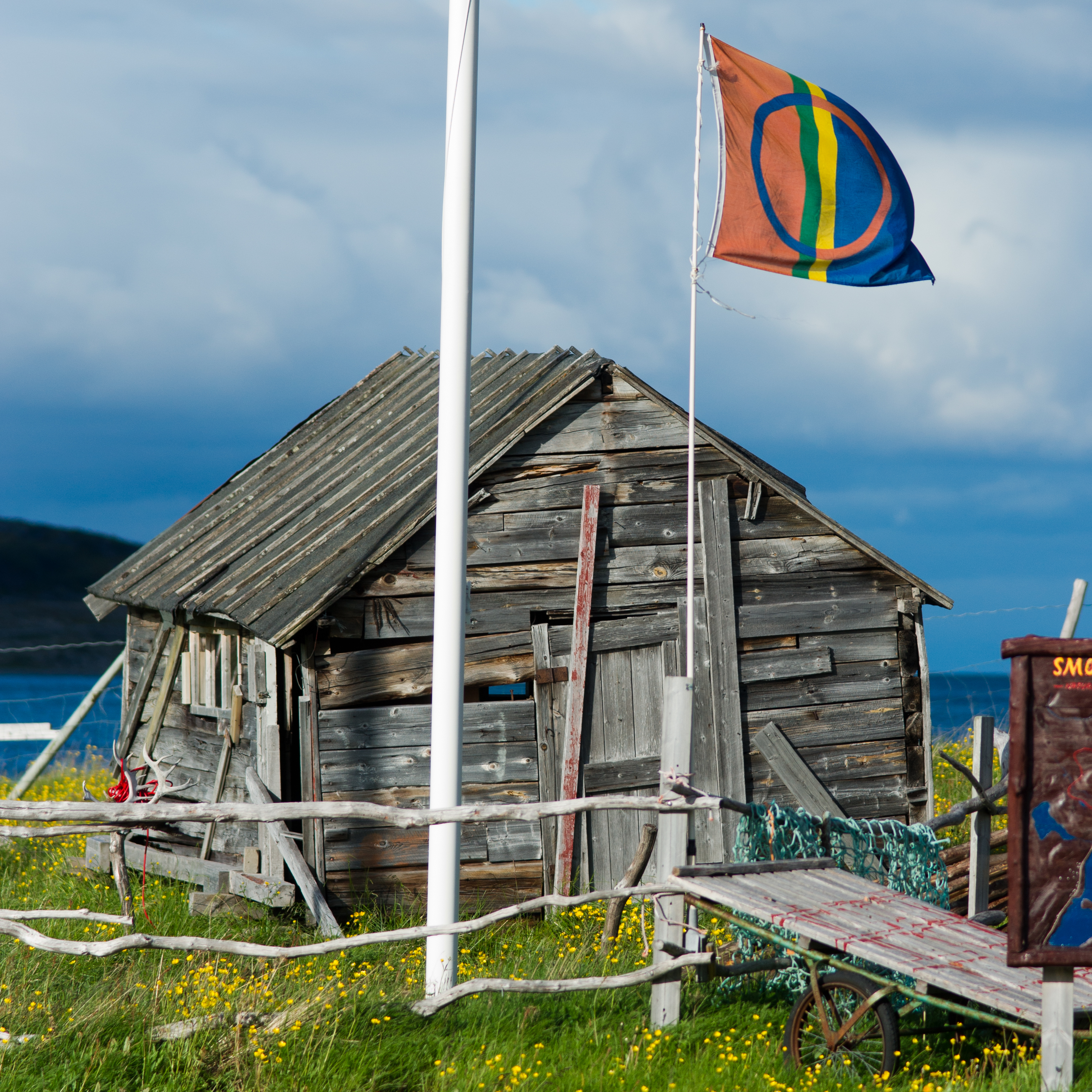
The Sami flag flying outside a cabin

The first official Sámi flag was recognized and inaugurated on 15 August 1986 by the 13th Nordic Sami Conference in Åre, Sweden. The flag was the result of a competition sponsored by the newspaper Sámi Áigi for which more than seventy suggestions were entered. In the end, one new design was considered against the existing, unofficial flag - and came out winning. The design was submitted by the Coast Sámi artist Astrid Båhl from Ivgobahta/Skibotn, in Romsa/Troms county, Norway.

The basic structure of the first Sámi flag was retained, but Båhl added the colour green, which is popular on many South Sámi gáktis. These four colours have been known since then as "the Sámi (national) colours". She also added a motif derived from a sun/moon symbol appearing on many shaman's drums. While the drawings on shaman's drums were only made in red (using an extract of the sacred alder tree), the motif on the flag uses both blue and red—the first representing the moon, the latter representing the sun. The Pantone colour formula used is: red 485C, green 356C, yellow 116C and blue 286C.

=== Children of the Sun ===
Sámi drum with sun-moon symbol (upper left)

The motif was chosen with the poem "Päiven Pārne'" ("Sons of the Sun") in mind. The poem was written down by the South Sámi Protestant priest Anders Fjellner in the mid-1800s from a joik rich with elements of Sámi shamanism. The poem describes the Sámi as "sons and daughters of the sun", through the union between a female "giant" (an unidentified mythological entity) who lives in a "House of Death" far in the North, and the Sun's male offspring with whom she elopes. The Sámi are also referred to as "offspring of the Sons of the Sun" in "Sami soga lavlla," the Sámi anthem.

== Official status ==
Seventeen years after its adoption by the Sámi Council, in 2003, the Sámi flag received official status in Norway, the country with the largest Sámi population. It is now compulsory for municipalities in Norway to fly the flag on 6 February, the Sámi National Day. The flag is also flown in parts of Finland and Sweden (especially Lapland) on the same day.

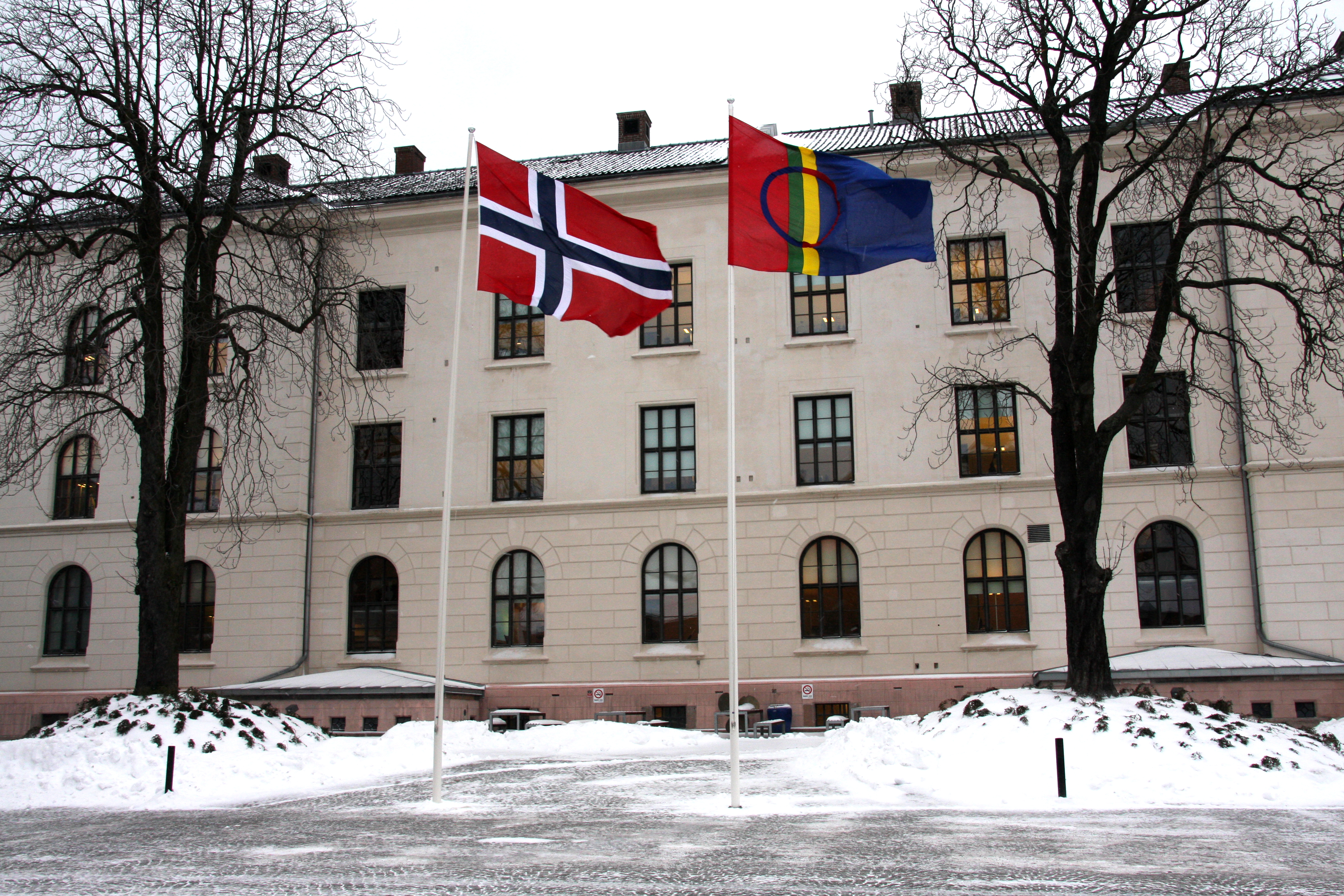
Sami and Norwegian flags flying in Akershus Fortress

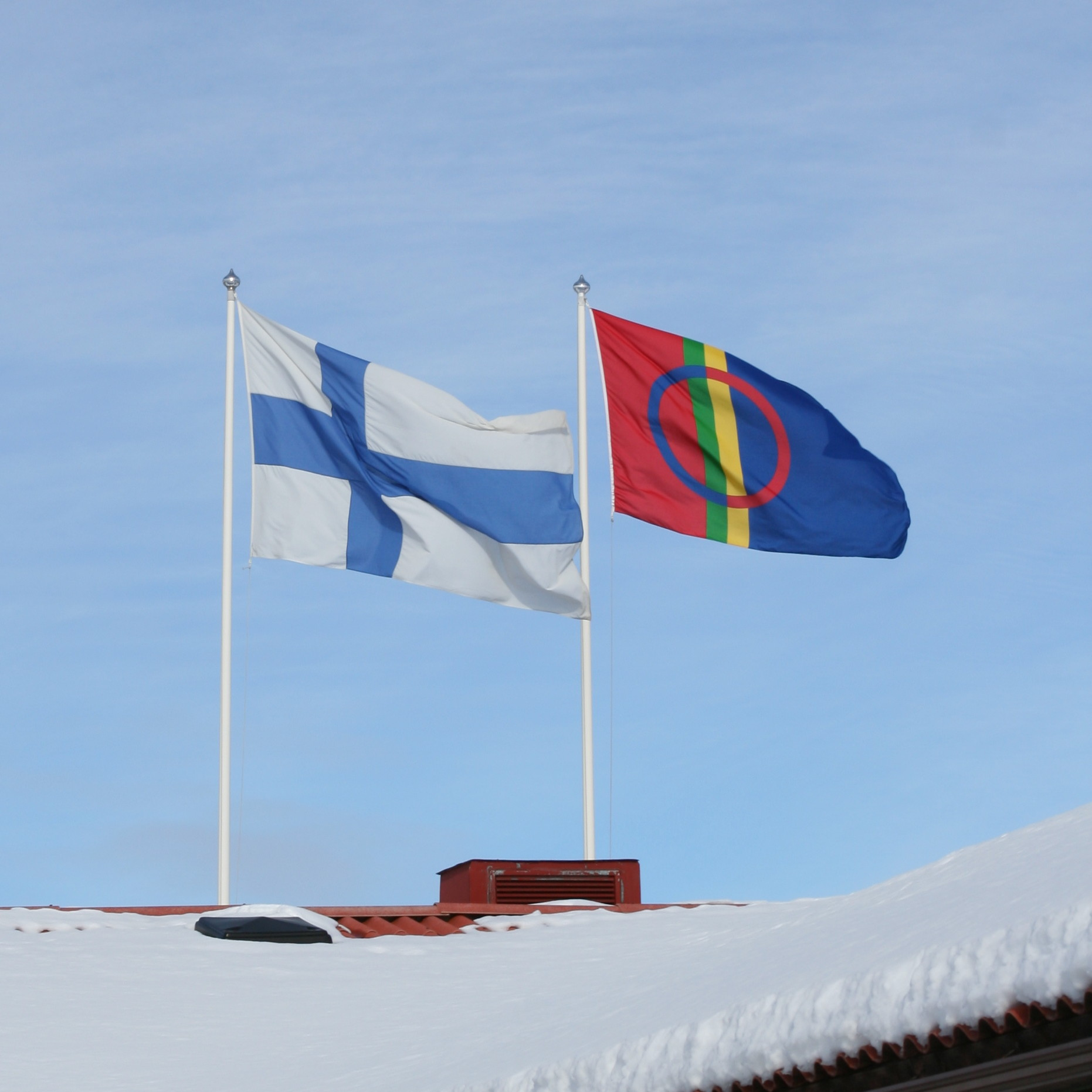
Sami and Finnish flags flying in Hetta

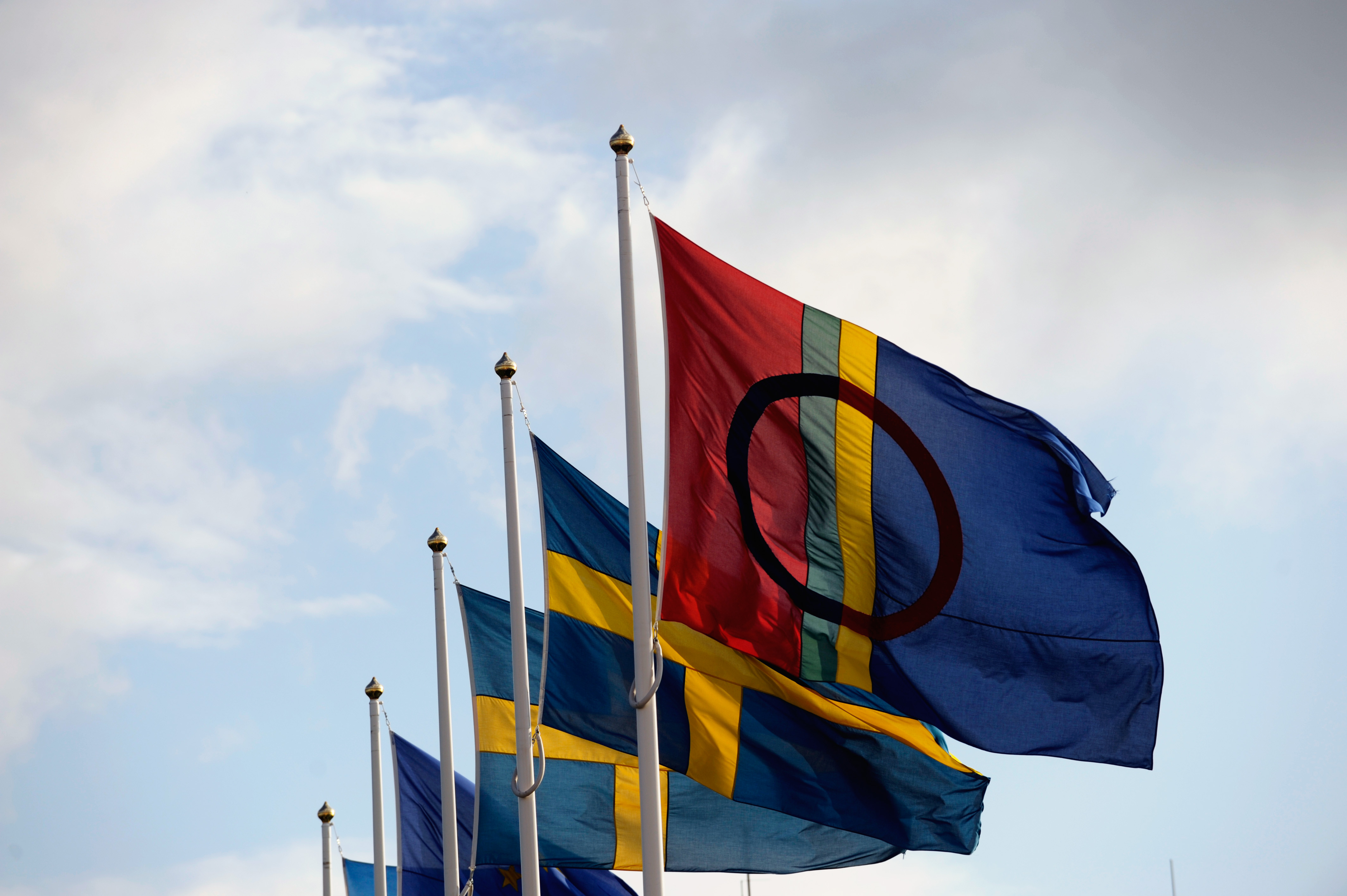
Sami and Swedish flags flying

The Sámi Council earlier had full ownership to the flag and other national symbols, but since the 18th Sámi Conference they now share that ownership with the Sámi Parliamentary Council. The joint committee of national symbols also has the duty right to determine new national symbols in accordance with international principles of heraldry.

== Sami flag days ==
Date	English name	Remarks
6 February	Sami National Day	To commemorate the first Sámi conference in Trondheim, 1917.
25 March	The Annunciation	
24 June	Midsummer	
9 August	The U.N. International Day of the World's Indigenous Peoples.	
15 August	Day of the Sami Flag	The Sami flag was recognized on 15 August 1986.
18 August	Day of the Saami Council	The Saami Council was formed on 18 August 1956.
26 August	Inauguration Day of the Swedish Sami Parliament	The Swedish Sami Parliament was inaugurated on 26 August 1993.
9 October	Inauguration Day of the Norwegian Sami Parliament	The Norwegian Sami Parliament was inaugurated on 9 October 1989.
9 November	Formation Day of the Finnish Sami Parliament	The Finnish Sami Parliament was formed on 9 November 1973.
15 November	Isak Saba day or The day of the Sami National Anthem.	The composer of the Sami "National Anthem", Isak Saba, was born on 15 November 1875.
29 November	Elsa Laula Renberg day	Elsa Laula Renberg was born on 29 November 1877. She was the chair of the organizing committee of the first Sámi Assembly of 1917 in Trondheim.

== Related symbols ==
=== Sámi Parliaments ===
The logo of the Sámi Parliament of Sweden features a circle in the four Sámi colours, while the Sámi Parliament of Finland features a circle and the three colours of the first Sámi flag. The Sámi Parliament of Norway's current logo does not incorporate elements of the flag.

=== Finnmark Estate ===
Finnmárkuopmodat, the autonomous entity established by the Finnmark Act has a logo that according to the entity's website "gets it colours from the Sámi and the Norwegian flag, as a symbol that the Finnmark Estate feels related to and responsible for both Sámi and Kvens, as well as ethnic Norwegians. [...] The circular shape... refers both to the Sámi flag's sun-symbol and to the solid and safe envelopment of a circle. [...] It is opened up to allow the Northern Lights a gateway into the Norwegian and the Sámi flag's colours."

=== Russian Sámi Organs ===
The elected Council of Plenipotentiary Representatives of the Sámi of Murmansk Province uses a symbol heavily inspired by the flag: two reindeer horns joined like a crescent, the upper half red and the lower half blue, between the halves are two stripes in yellow and green. The official Centre for Indigenous People in Murmansk Province, under which the official Council of Indigenous Peoples under the [Provincial] Government operates, uses a logo also inspired by the flag: a circle, left half blue and right half red, at the centre of which is a brown lávvu, a blue line symbolizing water, and a multicoloured line symbolizing the Aurora Borealis, the colours of the latter being from left to right red, yellow, green and blue.

== Colors ==
Colours scheme	R	G	B	Hex	Preview
Red	221	31	25	#DD1F19	
Green	0	115	36	#007324	
Yellow	255	207	0	#FFCF00	
Blue	0	50	174	#0032AE	
