= Sámi Áigi =

Northern Sámi-language newspaper

- Type: Weekly
- Format: Tabloid
- Launched: 1978
- Ceased publication: April 1993
- Language: Northern Sámi
- Headquarters: Kárášjohka, Norway
- ISSN: 0333-4198
- Website: www.minaigi.no

Sámi Áigi was a Northern Sámi-language weekly newspaper established in 1978, providing an alternative to the Norwegian-language Sámi publication Ságat. Sámi Áigi played a prominent role in building and empowering Sámi identity during the Alta controversy and throughout the 1980s.

== History ==
Sámi Áigi (Northern Sami for 'Sámi Times') was launched with the backing of the Norwegian Sámi Association, Norwegian Reindeer Husbandry Association, and the Saami Council to build connections among the Sámi of Norway, Sweden, and Finland. The new paper was based in Kárášjohka, Norway, but had readers across Sápmi. The development of a pan-Scandinavian Northern Sámi orthography gave additional relevancy to the new newspaper. Its first issue was published in January 1979, with the following text on the front page: "The time of darkness is soon over. The time of the Sámi [Sámi Áigi] has come". (Note: Original quote: "Sevdnjes áigi nohkagoahta, Sámi Áigi boahtan læ") It quickly drew readers away from the more conservative Ságat and within a year of launch the papers had a similar circulation level of about 2,000 readers, and the two papers competed for the subsidy provided by Norway for Sámi media.

As a primary source of news and information in Northern Sámi, Sámi Áigi was successful in covering increasing demands for respect for Sámi identity and concerns, including during the protests surrounding construction of a hydroelectric power plant in the Alta river in Finnmark. While the editors of Ságat struck a more conciliatory tone, Sámi Áigi was firmly on the side of the protesters. The paper provided an outlet for debate and criticism of Scandinavian and Sámi political organizations and was also associated with the ČSV cultural movement. In 1986, Sámi Áigi sponsored a contest, won by Astrid Båhl, to design a new Sámi flag.

== Legacy ==
Despite its wide readership and a state subsidy, Sámi Áigi was plagued by economic issues for the majority of its existence. In April 1993, the paper ceased publication and entered bankruptcy. However, its staff and owners moved quickly to launch a new newspaper, Min Áigi, which published until 2008 when it merged with rival Áššu to form the daily newspaper Ávvir.

== See also ==
- Min Áigi
- Áššu
- Ávvir
