= Valentina Sovkina =

Russian Sámi politician

- Валентина Совкина

Chair of the Kola Sámi Assembly

Personal details
- Born: 10 September 1963 (age 63) Lovozero, Murmansk, USSR
- Education: Murmansk Pedagogical Institute
- Occupation: Sámi Activist

Valentina Vyacheslavovna Sovkina (Russian: Валентина Вячеславовна Совкина, b. 10 September 1963) is a Russian-Sami politician and chair of the Kola Sámi Assembly.

== Biography ==
Sovkina was born in 1963 in the village of Lovozero in Murmansk Oblast, where she still lives. Her parents were Sámi and she grew up in a Kildin Sámi-speaking household, although she was not allowed to use the language in school. Her grandparents followed traditional Sámi professions, including reindeer herding, fishing, hunting, and gathering, but her family become settled in Lovozero under Soviet policies of the time. She trained as a teacher, studying education and psychology, and graduating from Murmansk Pedagogical Institute (now Murmansk Arctic State University). She was a teacher at the kindergarten, primary, and secondary levels and ran a vocational school. She also previously worked for the Barents Secretariat and since 2013 has run Kola Sámi Radio.

== Sámi leadership ==
Sovkina served as chair of the Association of Sámi in Murmansk Oblast and at the 2nd Congress of the Russian Sámi in 2010 she was elected as chair of the Kola Sámi Assembly. The assembly serves as the parliament for Russian Sámi, parallel to the Sámi parliaments of Finland, Norway, and Sweden; however, Russian federal and Murmansk local authorities have refused to recognize the assembly.

=== Views on Russian Sámi issues ===
According to Sovkina, the Russian Sámi population in Russia is suffering a natural decline due to the small family size of modern Sámi families. This is complicated, however, Sovkina states, by the lower social status of Sámi and their corresponding economic insecurity due in part to a lack of support and social well-being initiatives from the Murmansk regional government.

=== 2014 Assault ===
In September 2014, Sovkina, as the representative for Russian Sámi, was scheduled to participate in the U.N. General Assembly's World Conference on Indigenous Peoples in New York City. On the way from Lovozero to the airport in Kirkenes, Norway, Sovkina's car was stopped three times by police. During the final stop, near Zapolyarny, Russia, she was attacked by a man who tried to grab her bag and passport. The police did not interfere with the attacker, but Sovkina managed to retain control of her belongings. Ultimately, she missed her plane and arrived a day late to the conference. Media reports on the incident noted that other Russian delegates to the conference also were harassed and delayed in attending the conference.

== See also ==
- Video interviews with Valentina Sovkina. "Women of the Arctic: Bridging Policy, Research, and Lived Experience," 2018 UArctic Congress, 6–7 September 2018.
