= Altaposten =

Norwegian newspaper

Altaposten is a Norwegian daily newspaper, published in Alta in Finnmark county, Norway.

== History and profile ==
Altaposten was founded in 1969, and its first editor was Øystein Dalland. From 1988 Ulf Jørgensen edited the newspaper, and since 2001 the editor-in-chief has been Rolf Edmund Lund. Altaposten was the owner of the Sami newspaper Áššu until its merge with Min Áigi to form Ávvir, which is owned by Altaposten together with Finnmark Dagblad.

Altaposten had a circulation of 4,793 copies in 2012. The 2013 circulation of the paper was 4,535 copies.
