= Tråante 2017 =

Festival marking the centennial of the Sámi Assembly of 1917

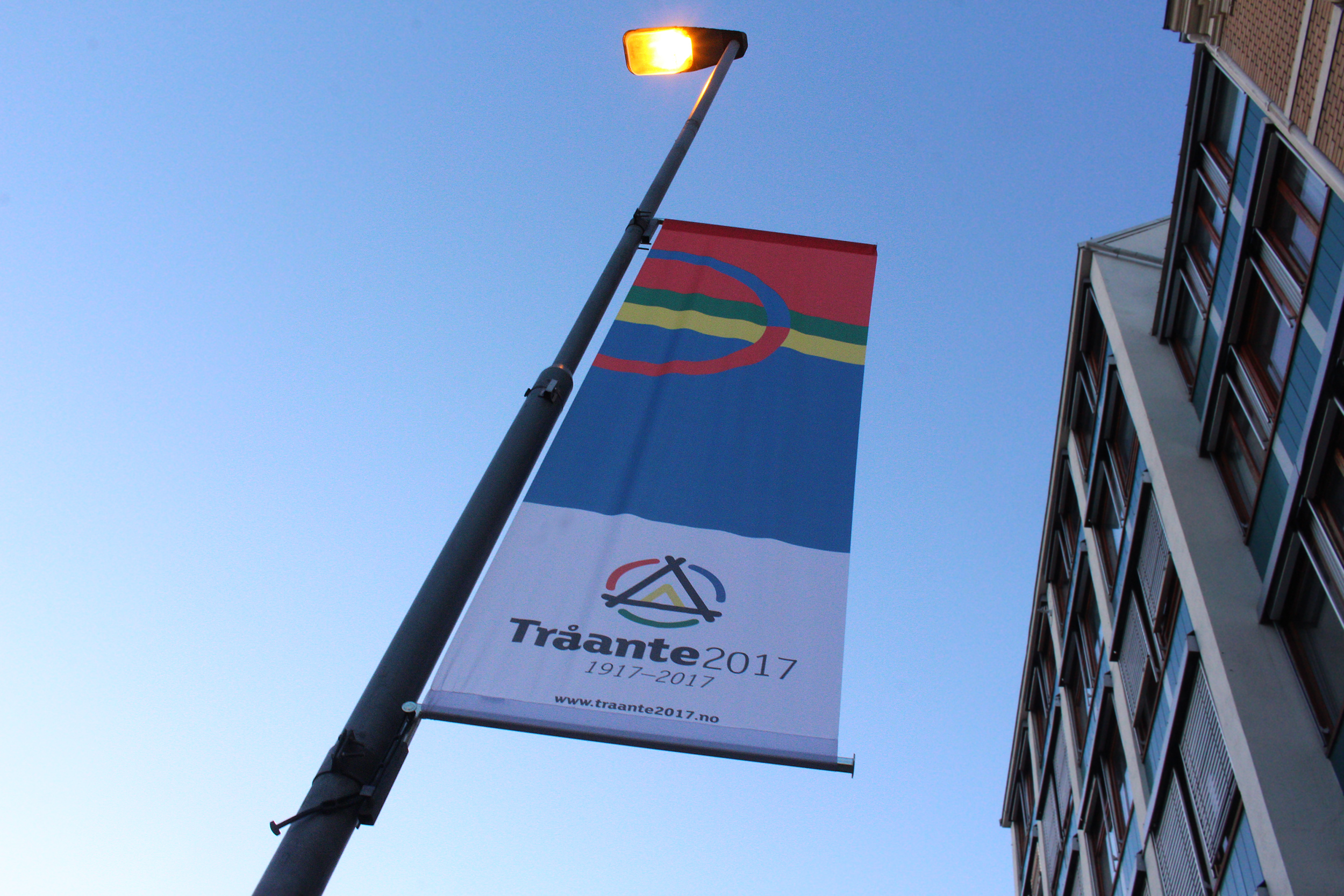
Sámi flag and Tråante 2017 logo on street banners in downtown Trondheim.

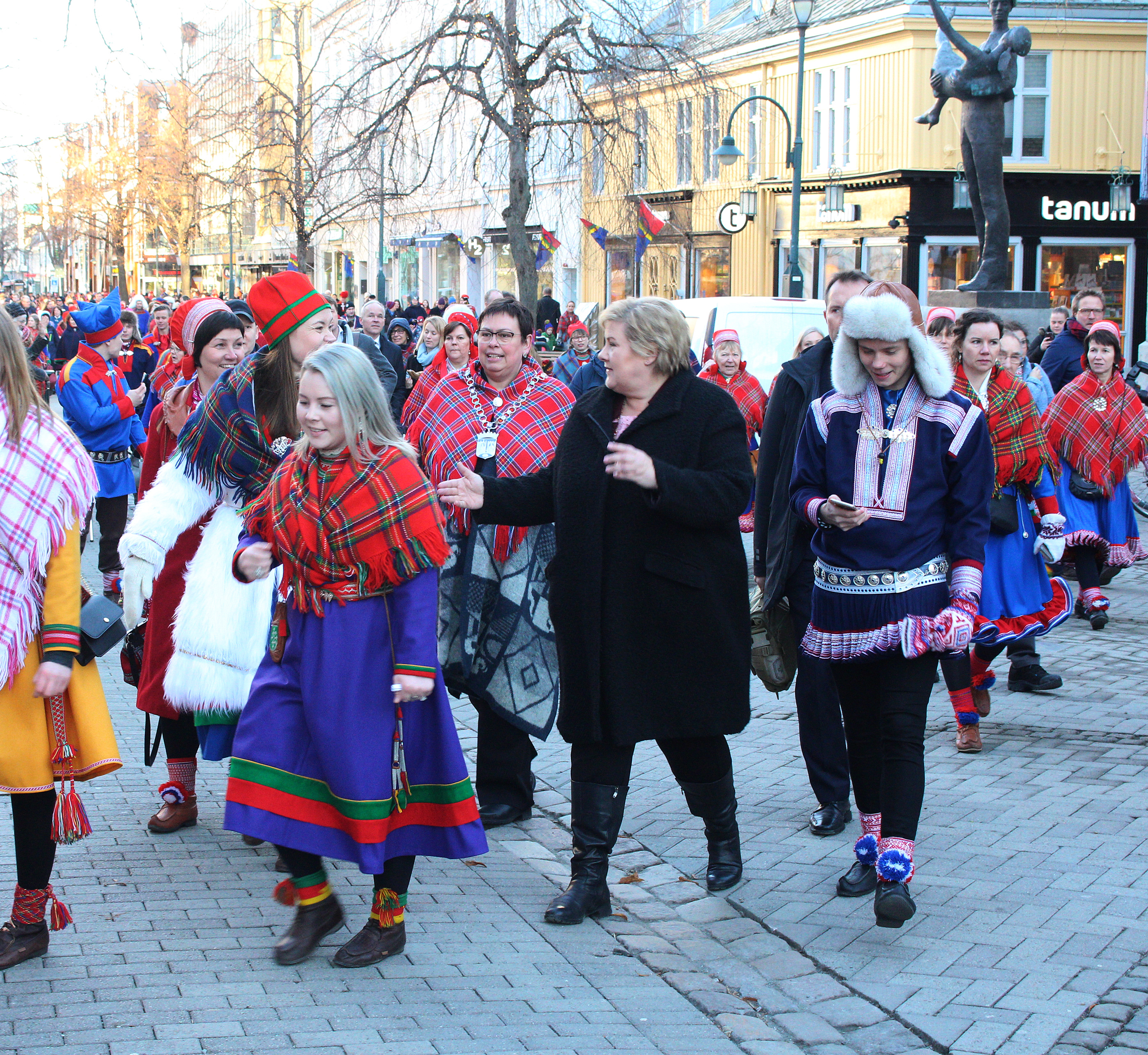
Norwegian Prime Minister Erna Solberg and Trondheim Mayor Rita Ottervik parade with Tråante 2017 project manager Ida Marie Bransfjell (white coat) and two Sámi Pathfinders.

Tråante 2017 was a celebration marking the centennial of the Sámi Assembly of 1917, which opened on 6 February 1917 in Trondheim, Norway. Trondheim is called "Tråante" in Southern Sámi.

The celebration started with a week-long anniversary celebration beginning on the Sámi National Day, 6 February 2017, in Trondheim, followed by additional cultural, sporting, religious, educational, research, industry, natural, and political events throughout the year. In addition to marking the 100th anniversary of the Sámi Assembly, Tråante 2017 served to disseminate knowledge about the Sámi people, their culture, and history across Norway, Sweden, Finland, and Russia.

Tråante 2017 was organized by the Sámediggi and the governments of Sør-Trøndelag county, Nord-Trøndelag county, and Trondheim municipality. Project manager for Tråante 2017 was Sámi politician Ida Marie Bransfjell.

== Activities ==
The NTNU Science Museum opened its exhibit "Hvem eier historien?" (Who owns the story?) on 5 February 2017. The exhibition documents the Sámi presence in southern Norway dating back to the 800s. The exhibition was created in collaboration with the Saemien Sijte Southern Sámi museum, the Rørosmuseet museum, and the Lesja Village Museum. As part of the exhibit, the Folldal drum was exhibited on loan from the Meininger Museen in Germany; it was the first time the Sámi shaman's drum was exhibited in Norway since 1723.

In connection with the 100th anniversary, Norges Bank issued a 20 Norwegian kroner coin with a Sami motif designed by artist Annelise Josefsen.

Posten Norge issued two stamps, designed by artist Astrid Båhl, who also designed the Sámi flag, to mark the 100th anniversary. The motifs on the stamps were the Sami Parliament building, the Sami flag, and a portrait of Sámi activist Elsa Laula Renberg.

On Sámi National Day, February 6, 2017, a Sámi altar was inaugurated in Nidaros Cathedral in Trondheim. The altar was designed by the artist Folke Fjällström and is made of oiled birch and adorned with Sámi ornaments.
