= Finnmark Dagblad =

Norwegian newspaper

- Owner: Amedia (100%)
- Founded: 1923
- Headquarters: Finnmark, Norway
- Circulation: 6,058 (2017)
- Website: ifinnmark.no

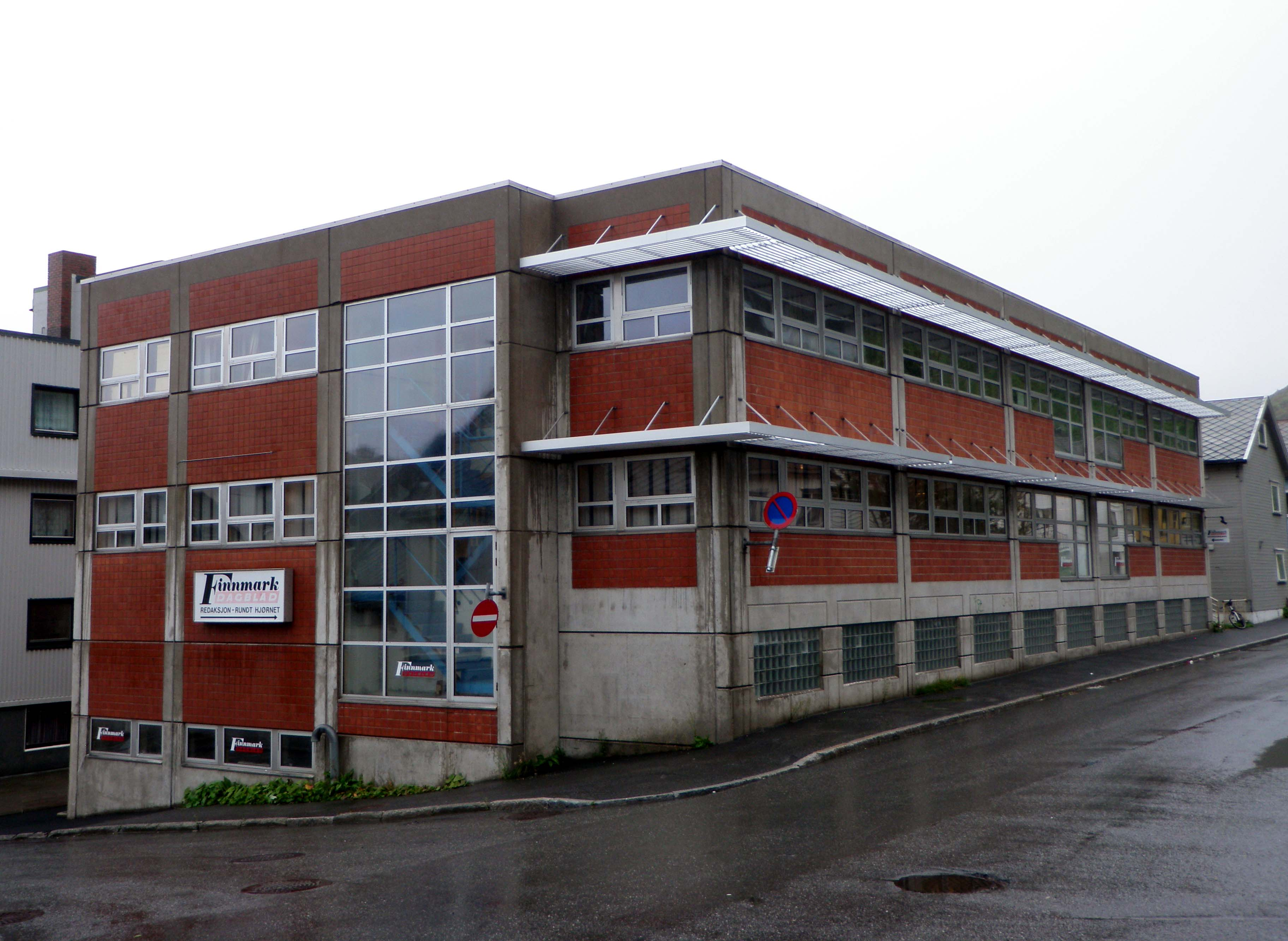
Finnmark Dagblad building in Hammerfest

Finnmark Dagblad is a Norwegian daily newspaper, published in Hammerfest, Norway. Since 24 October 2023, the newspaper published issues on Tuesdays and Thursdays.

The newspaper was founded in 1913 as Vestfinmarkens Socialdemokrat. It changed its name to Vestfinnmark Arbeiderblad in 1923. From 1940 the newspaper was taken over by Nasjonal Samling, and it was renamed first to Vestfinnmark Folkeblad, later to Finnmark Folkeblad. From 1946 it started publication as Vestfinnmark Arbeiderblad, and changed its name to Finnmark Dagblad in 1960. Finnmark Dagblad was the predominant owner of the Sami newspaper Min Áigi until its merge with Áššu to form Ávvir, which is owned by Finnmark Dagblad together with Altaposten.
