= Astrid Båhl =

Norwegian–Sámi artist (born 1959)

- Sámi flag, designed by Astrid Båhl
- Born: Astrid Margarete Bål; 6 June 1959 (age 67); Karesuando, Sweden
- Education: Norwegian National Academy of Craft and Art Industry
- Known for: Designing the Sámi Flag

Astrid Båhl (born Astrid Margarete Bål; 6 June 1959) is a Norwegian Sámi artist. In addition to her other work, she also designed the Sámi flag.

== Biography ==
Astrid Båhl was born in 1959 in Karesuando in Norrbotten County, Sweden, and she moved as a child to Skibotn in Storfjord Municipality, Troms County, Norway. She studied art education in secondary school in Narvik, and continued her training at the Norwegian National Academy of Craft and Art Industry in Oslo, where she studied textile printing, graphic design, and freehand drawing. Båhl has exhibited her work in several exhibitions, including "Mijjen luunie – Kums oss" a South Sámi mobile exhibition in 1994, and "ČSV- å visualisere Sápmi" on Jeløya in 2006.

In 1986, she won a competition sponsored by the newspaper Sámi Áigi to design a flag for the Sámi people, beating over 70 other entries. The flag was officially adopted and raised for the first time at the 13th Sámi Conference in Åre, Sweden on 15 August 1986. According to Båhl, the flag design was inspired by the Southern Sámi-language poem "Päiven Pārne'" (Sons of the Sun) by Anders Fjellner and symbolizes that the sun gives life to the earth. In her design, Båhl also drew inspiration from old writings and books about Sámi languages, mythology, and symbolism.

Båhl also designed the Norwegian postage stamps for Tråante 2017, a festival commemorating the 100th anniversary of the Sámi Assembly of 1917 in Trondheim.
