= Annelise Josefsen =

Norwegian artist, sculptor (born 1949)

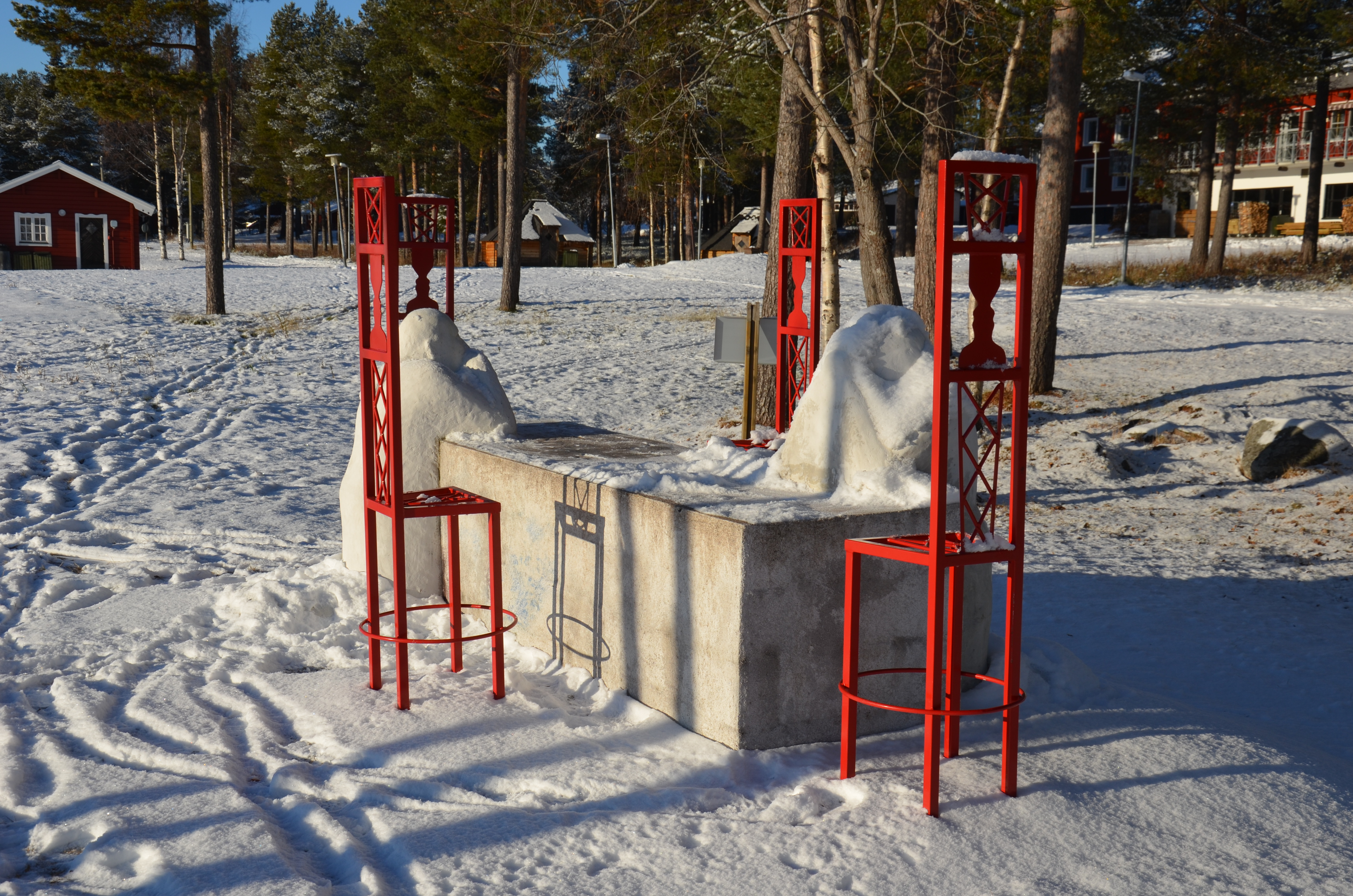
Iditboddu/Morgenstund in Jokkmokk

Annelise Josefsen (born 2 October 1949) is a Norwegian-Sami artist. She works in many different techniques, but has particularly marked herself as a sculptor. She has been active in the Sami Artists Association (SDS), serving as chair of the board for several periods.

== Biography ==
Annelise Josefsen was born on 2 October 1949 in Hammerfest. She grew up in Sæterfjord in the neighboring Kvalsund Municipality in Finnmark. Her family ancestry is Seaside Sami.

Josefsen began her education at the Sami Folk High School in Karasjok. She then studied textile work at Finnmark homecraft school in Lakselv before furthering her training as an artist at the Western Academy of Fine Arts in Bergen (1979-1983).

On the occasion of her 60th birthday in 2009, she was invited to hold a separate exhibition in the Sami artist center, entitled "Dream and Deception". On 5 February 2017 the SDS opened the art exhibition ÁIGEMÁTKI (TIME TRAVEL) in Kraftbyen in Trondheim Municipality, as part of Tråante 2017. The exhibition shows works by 21 Sami artists from Norway, Sweden, and Finland. Josefsen was one of the artists represented at the exhibition. After exhibiting in Trondheim, the works traveled to other exhibition venues in the three countries. In the same month, Norges Bank issued a 20-krone coin with a Sami motif in connection with Sámi Assembly of 1917, the 100th anniversary of the first national meeting of the same people. The coin was designed by Josefsen, who in 2016 won a competition for this assignment.

Josefsen lives and works in Kokelv, Revsbotten, Finnmark.

== Public art ==
- 2014: Muitu ("Remembrance"), war memorial at Tana church on Rustefjelbma in Tana municipality
- 2013: Støttetroppen,, sculpture group in Iddefjord granite, the outdoor area in Setermoen camp
- 2013: Bakmenn, decoration of foundation wall in the canteen at Lakselv upper secondary school
- 2013: Potensial, sculpture outside Lakselv high school
- 2011: Tanker for to, two sculptures in Tranøy sculpture park, Tranøy, Hamarøy:

- Jente i tanker, Balmoral granite
- Gutt i tanker, Kuru Gray granite

- 2011: Rast ved veiskillet, Evjen granite. The sculpture stands at a resting place in the sculpture section of the Krutfjellsvägen at Tärnaby in Sweden
- 2011: Min bovdna, sculpture in polyester and porcelain, Vestfold University College, Bakkenteigen
- 2004: Iditboddu/Morgenstund,, sculpture group in concrete and metal; Sami sculpture park, Jokkmokk
- 2004: Messepikene,, granite sculpture group; the outdoor area at the fair at Setermoen camp; this was the winner's draft in a decoration competition in 2004
- 2004: Stallos hjerte, sculpture group in stone and wood, Statoil's administration building on Melkøya at Hammerfest
- 2000: Den lille internat-tanta, sculpture, the outdoor area at Sameskolen in Målselv
- 2000: U-dyr med to hoder, Ser to veier,, sculpture, outside area at Sameskolen in Målselv
- 1993: Bølgen, sculpture in lime tree, Hammerfest Library
- 1993: Uten tittel, sculpture in stone from Lødingen, at the university square in Tromsø

== Awards ==
Josefsen has received a number of scholarships:

- 1984: State establishment grant
- 1985: Inger and Edvard Munch's scholarship
- 1986: Nordic Council of Ministers' travel scholarship
- 1987: Establishment grant
- 1988: The Remuneration Fund
- 1989: John Savio BKH Scholarship
- 1991-1993: The state's 3-year scholarship for Sami artists
- 2010: Sami Artists and Writers Remuneration Fund (SKFV) scholarship for spiritual practitioners
- 2015: Sami Artists and Writers Remuneration Fund (SKFV) material grant for 2015
- 2016: Sami Artists and Writers Remuneration Fund (SKFV) Material Scholarship for 2016
