= Elections to the Sámi Parliament of Sweden =

Elections to the Sámi Parliament of Sweden have taken place every four years following the establishment of the Parliament in 1993. The most recent elections took place in 2025.

Elections are organised by the Swedish election authority alongside the administrative board of Norbotten and the Sámi Parliament election committee. The elections use a proportional system of seat distribution.

== Voter eligibility ==
Voters must be on a special electoral register to vote in these elections. The register includes any Sámi person who is registered with their electoral board and is a Swedish citizen over the age of 18 on the date of the election. Sámi without Swedish citizenship can also vote if they have been registered as residing in Sweden for 3 consecutive years prior to the election.

In order to be considered part of the Sámi people, a person must consider themselves to be Sámi and either:

- Have/had Sámi as a language at home
- Have a parent or grandparent who had/has Sámi as a language at home, or
- Have a parent who is/has been registered as a voter.

The election committee draws up a preliminary voter list by November of the year before the election, and a final list by March of the election year.

== 2025 election results ==
The 2025 election was held on 18 May 2025. 9,755 people were registered to vote.

The results were as follows:

| Party | Votes | % | Seats | +/– |
|---|---|---|---|---|
| Hunting and Fishing Sámi (JF) | 2,238 | 37.70 | 12 | 0 |
| Sámi Land Party (SP) | 1,336 | 22.51 | 7 | +1 |
| Morning Star (Sámi) (G) | 1,087 | 18.31 | 6 | +1 |
| Forest Sámi Party (VS) | 413 | 6.96 | 2 | –1 |
| Swedish Sámi National Party (LSS) | 383 | 6.45 | 2 | 0 |
| The Sámi (SAM) | 255 | 4.30 | 1 | –1 |
| Our Way (Sámi) (MG) | 224 | 3.77 | 1 | 0 |
| Total | 5,936 | 100.00 | 31 | – |
| Registered voters/turnout | 9,755 | 60.88 | | |
Source: Swedish Electoral Authority Full results

== 2021 election results ==
The 2021 election was held on 6 May 2021, and saw the Hunting and Fishing Sámi party maintain its first-place position.

The results were as follows:

| Party | Votes | % | Seats | +/– |
|---|---|---|---|---|
| Hunting and Fishing Sámi (JF) | 2,242 | 37.54 | 12 | +3 |
| Sámi Land Party (SP) | 1,161 | 19.44 | 6 | –1 |
| Morning Star (Sámi) (G) | 976 | 16.34 | 5 | 0 |
| Forest Sámi Party (VS) | 517 | 8.66 | 3 | 0 |
| Swedish Sámi National Party (LSS) | 446 | 7.47 | 2 | –1 |
| The Sámi (SAM) | 343 | 5.74 | 2 | +1 |
| Our Way (Sámi) (MG) | 230 | 3.85 | 1 | 0 |
| New Sámi Reform Party (NSR) | 58 | 0.97 | 0 | New |
| Total | 5,973 | 100.00 | 31 | – |
| Registered voters/turnout | 9,220 | 64.78 | | |
Source: Swedish Electoral Authority Historic elections

== 2017 election results ==
The 2017 election was held on 21 May 2017, with the Hunting and Fishing Sámi Party winning the most votes.

The results were as follows:

| Party | Votes | % | Seats | +/– |
|---|---|---|---|---|
| Hunting and Fishing Sámi (JF) | 1,469 | 29.16 | 9 | 0 |
| Sámi Land Party (SP) | 1,198 | 23.78 | 7 | +1 |
| Morning Star (Sámi) (G) | 786 | 15.60 | 5 | +2 |
| Forest Sámi Party (VS) | 477 | 9.47 | 3 | 0 |
| Swedish Sámi National Party (LSS) | 422 | 8.38 | 3 | 0 |
| The Sámi (SAM) | 233 | 4.62 | 1 | –1 |
| Our Way (Sámi) (MG) | 199 | 3.95 | 1 | –3 |
| Sámi Referendum Party (SF) | 132 | 2.62 | 1 | New |
| Álbmut People (AAAF) | 122 | 2.42 | 1 | 0 |
| Total | 5,038 | 100.00 | 31 | – |
| Registered voters/turnout | 8,766 | 57.68 | | |
Source: Swedish Electoral Authority Historic elections

== 2013 election results ==
The 2013 election was held on the 19th of May 2013, with the Hunting and Fishing Sámi Party winning the most votes.

The results were as follows:

| Party | Votes | % | Seats | +/– |
|---|---|---|---|---|
| Hunting and Fishing Sámi (JF) | 1,209 | 27.21 | 9 | +2 |
| Sámi Land Party (SP) | 904 | 20.35 | 6 | 0 |
| Our Way (Sámi) (MG) | 620 | 13.95 | 4 | +1 |
| Morning Star (Sámi) (G) | 450 | 10.13 | 3 | -1 |
| Swedish Sámi National Party (LSS) | 440 | 9.90 | 3 | +1 |
| Forest Sámi Party (VS) | 379 | 8.53 | 3 | 0 |
| The Sámi (SAM) | 334 | 7.52 | 2 | –3 |
| Sámi Referendum Party (AAAF) | 107 | 2.41 | 1 | 0 |
| Total | 4,443 | 100.00 | 31 | – |
| Registered voters/turnout | 8,322 | 54.40 | | |
Source: Swedish Electoral Authority Historic elections

== 2009 election results ==
| Party | Votes | % | Seats | +/– |
|---|---|---|---|---|
| Hunting and Fishing Sámi (JF) | 1,069 | 23.45 | 7 | -2 |
| Sámi Land Party (SP) | 908 | 19.92 | 6 | -2 |
| The Sámi (SAM) | 649 | 14.24 | 5 | +1 |
| Morning Star (Sámi) (G) | 625 | 13.71 | 4 | +1 |
| Our Way (Sámi) (MG) | 496 | 10.88 | 3 | 0 |
| Forest Sámi Party (VS) | 450 | 9.87 | 3 | -1 |
| Swedish Sámi National Party (LSS) | 244 | 5.35 | 2 | +2 |
| Sámi Referendum Party (AAAF) | 117 | 2.57 | 1 | +1 |
| Total | 4,558 | 100.00 | 31 | – |
| Registered voters/turnout | 7,812 | 59.18 | | |
Source: Swedish Electoral Authority Historic elections

== 2005 election results ==
| Party | Votes | % | Seats |
|---|---|---|---|
| Hunting and Fishing Sámi (JF) | 1,361 | 30.18 | 9 |
| Sámi Land Party (SP) | 1,165 | 25.83 | 8 |
| The Sámi (SAM) | 566 | 12.55 | 4 |
| Forest Sámi Party (VS) | 534 | 11.84 | 4 |
| Our Way (Sámi) (MG) | 473 | 10.49 | 3 |
| Morning Star (Sámi) (G) | 411 | 9.11 | 3 |
| Total | 4,510 | 100.00 | 31 |
| Registered voters/turnout | 7,180 | 62.87 | |
Source: Swedish Electoral Authority Historic elections
