= Ávvir =

Northern Sámi-language newspaper

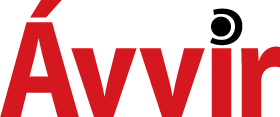
- Type: Weekdays
- Format: Tabloid
- Editor-in-chief: Kari Lisbeth Hermansen
- Launched: February 6, 2008
- Language: Northern Sámi
- Headquarters: Kárášjohka, Norway
- Circulation: 820 (in 2024)
- ISSN: 1890-6575
- Website: www.avvir.no

Ávvir is a newspaper written in the Northern Sámi language with editorial offices or reporters in Kárášjohka, Guovdageaidnu, Áltá, Girkonjárga, and Romsa, Norway. It is currently published five times a week, from Monday to Friday, and has readership across Sápmi.

== History ==
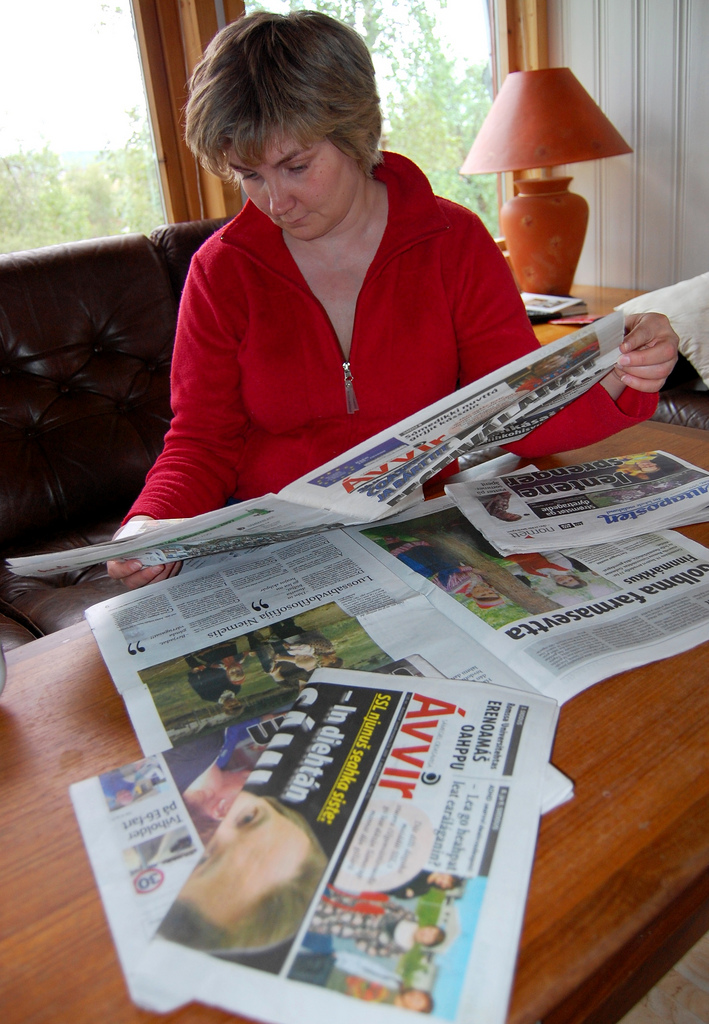
Aili Keskitalo reading Avvir and other newspapers

Ávvir launched in 2008 on Sami National Day (6 February) It was founded through the merger of rival Northern Sámi-language tabloids Áššu and Min Áigi. Min Áigi chairman Magne Svineng stated that due to higher production costs, mergering Áššu and Min Áigi was the only way to meet the need for a daily Sámi-language newspaper with wide distribution. Ávvir maintained editorial bureaus in Kárášjohka and Guovdageaidnu, the respective headquarters of Min Áigi and Áššu, and its management is co-located with Altaposten in Alta. The paper is owned by Sami Aviisa AS, which is one-third owned by Nord Avis AS (the owner of Altaposten), one-third by Amedia, and one-third by local owners.

On 5 March 2017, Ávvir launched an online edition to better reach younger readers, as well as extend its readership across the Swedish, Finnish, and Russian portions of Sápmi.

In 2016, Ávvir reported earning a profit of NOK 526,475. Funding for the paper comes from advertising, subscriptions, and a Sámi media subsidy provided by the Norwegian government. In 2014, to help meet the need for Northern Sámi-language print media in Sweden, the Sámi Parliament of Sweden made it easier for Ávvir to operate in Sweden.

The name for Ávvir was proposed by Láilá Susanne Vars of Láhpoluoppal in Guovdageaidnu. The word ávvir translates into English as "care" or "attention" The paper is credited with helping to preserve and develop the Northern Sámi language.

== Editor-in-chief ==
- Ánte Bals 2008–2009
- Sara Beate Nilsdatter Eira, December 2009 – July 2013
- Kari Lisbeth Hermansen, July 2013–

== Circulation ==
Number of Subscribers
2008	2009	2010	2011	2012	2013	2014	2015	2016	2017	2018	2019
1,204	1,204	1,271	1,088	1,047	1,064	1,024	966	1,031	913	879	861
