= Min Áigi =

Norwegian Sámi newspaper

- Type: Twice weekly
- Format: Tabloid
- Owner(s): Finnmark Dagblad, Kárášjoga Municipality, Norwegian Sámi Association, Samenes Landsforbund, Davvi Girji, local Sámi societies and individual shareholders
- Editor-in-chief: Svein Nordsletta
- Launched: May 22, 1993
- Ceased publication: January 30, 2008
- Language: Northern Sámi
- Headquarters: Kárášjohka, Norway
- Circulation: 1,104 (in 2007)
- ISSN: 0805-5017
- Website: www.minaigi.no

Min Áigi (Our Time in Northern Sami) was a twice-weekly Northern Sámi language newspaper based in Kárášjohka, Norway. In 2008, Min Áigi ceased publication to merge with the rival paper Áššu to form Ávvir.

== History ==
Min Áigi was founded as a continuation of the influential Sámi newspaper Sámi Áigi, which went bankrupt in March 1993. The first issue of Min Áigi was published two months later on 22 May 1993.

Although the newspaper's editorial staff and most of its subscribers were from Norway, Min Áigi was intended to be a newspaper for Sámi people throughout the Nordic countries. Finnmark Dagblad in Hammerfest was the main stakeholder in the newspaper through the company Min Áigi OS. Other stakeholders included Kárášjoga gielda, the Norgga Sámiid Riikasearvi, the Samiid Ædnansær'vi / Samenes Landsforbund and the publisher Davvi Girji. The editor-in-chief was Svein Nordsletta.

Min Áigi also published a children's magazine called Leavedolgi.

Min Áigi maintained local offices in Deanušaldi, Guovdageaidnu, and Johkamohkki. Its marketing department was based in Leavdnja.

== Merger ==
On 27 August 2007, Min Áigi and its rival Áššu announced plans to merge to create a Northern Sámi-language daily newspaper, Ávvir. A week after Min Áigi published its final issue, Ávvir launched on 6 February 2008, the Sami National Day. Min Áigi chairman Magne Svineng stated that due to higher production costs, mergering Áššu and Min Áigi was the only way to meet the need for a daily Sámi-language newspaper with wide distribution. Ávvir maintained editorial bureaus in Kárášjohka and Guovdageaidnu, the respective headquarters of Min Áigi and Áššu.

== Circulation ==
Number of Subscribers
2000	2001	2002	2003	2004	2005	2006	2007
964	1,142	1,197	1,072	1,211	1,179	1,177	1,104

== See also ==
- Áššu
- Ávvir
