= Kola Sámi Assembly =

Representative assembly for Russian Sámi

The Kola Sámi Assembly (Kildin Sami: Куэллнэгк нёарк Са̄мь Соббар; Russian: Саамское собрание Кольского полуострова) is an elected assembly established in 2010 by the Sámi people of the Kola Peninsula in Russia on the model of Sámi parliaments in Nordic countries. As of 2018, it was not recognised as a political or legislative entity by the Russian federal nor local Murmansk Oblast governments under the pretext of "combatting separatism"; it remains a purely representative organ with unclear relations with the government, because establishing new legislative organs requires amendments to Russian federal and regional legislation.

== Establishment ==
On 14 December 2008, the 1st Congress of the Russian Sámi was held with the participation of the Kola Sámi Association and the Association of Sámi in Murmansk Oblast to establish a framework for creation of a Russian Sámi parliament, the Sami Parliament of Kola Peninsula. A suggestion to have the Russian Federation pick representatives to the new assembly was voted down by a clear majority. The Congress also chose a Council of Representatives tasked with working to establish a parliament and to otherwise represent Russian Sámi.

Two years later, the 2nd Congress of the Russian Sámi convened in Murmansk on 12 December 2010, to elect members to the new Kola Sámi Assembly. The aims of the assembly are to represent the Sámi people and to work towards a recognised Russian Sámi Parliament. According to one commentator, however, "in the ... Assembly, the Kola Sámi have achieved their most unifying and representative structure to date;" the extent to which the Murmansk regional authorities are prepared to work with this body remains unclear.

During preparation for the planned 3rd Congress of the Russian Sámi in 2014, Russian authorities worked to establish a new gathering, the Congress of the Indigenous People of the Northern Kola – Sámi, with the goal of sidelining the Kola Sámi Assembly in favor of a new organization more aligned with local governmental officials.

== Predecessor ==
On O.S. 25 January 1868 (N.S. 6 February 1868), the Kola Sobbar (Кóладаг сóббарь) was established as the first elected body to represent Russian Sámi. Although there is no direct lineage between the Kola Sobbar and the Kola Sámi Assembly, it is cited as an example of a prior Russian Sámi elected assembly. By coincidence, the Kola Sobbar met on the same day as what would later be declared the annual Sámi National Day across Sápmi.

== Links with Sámi parliaments in other countries ==
Full participation for the Kola Sámi Assembly in the Saami Council depends upon Sámi parliaments in the other Nordic countries accepting the Kola Sámi Assembly as a "Russian Sámi Parliament". Since Russia does not recognize the assembly, the Kola Sámi Association and Association of Sámi in Murmansk Oblast are both seated as members of the Saami Council and have representation on the Sámi Parliamentary Council. Initially, the Russian Sámi were granted observer status in 2000, but three years later they were allowed to be participating observers.

In 2012, members of the Kola Sámi Assembly and other Russian Sámi associations visited the Sámi Parliament of Norway in Kárášjohka to learn more about its structure and operations as part of a competency building tour.

== See also ==
- Sámi politics
- Lovozero (rural locality) (the cultural centre of Russian Sámi)
- Kola Sámi Association
- Association of Sámi in Murmansk Oblast
