= Stig Gælok =

Lule Saami author

Stig Riemmbe Gaelok was born on 7 July 1961 in Tysfjord Municipality (known as Divtasvuona Municipality in Sami). He is a Sami author who writes his books in Lule Same language (julevsámegiella) and Norwegian language (norsk). His first book, the poetry collection O, Oarjjevuodna, which was published in 1983, was the first collection of poems ever in Lule Same, and also the first book in Lule Same since Anta Pirak´s book Jåhttee saamee viessom, which was published 46 years earlier, in 1937, and was the first book ever written by a Lule Same author in Lule Same language.

In 2000, he was awarded the Saami Council's Prize for Literature.

== Bibliography ==
=== Poetry ===
- 1983: O, Oarjjevuodna (poems, Lule Same). Illustrations by Lilian Urheim. Publisher: Jår'galæd'dji, Karasjok, Norway.
- 1986: Vuonak/... fra fjordene (poetic story, Lule Same/Norwegian). Cover illustration by Lilian Urheim. Publisher: Th. Blaasværs Forlag, Hamarøy, Norway.
- 1988: amuk/... den fremmede (poetic story, Lule Same/Norwegian). Cover illustration by Hans Ragnar Mathisen. Publisher: Th. Blaasværs Forlag, Hamarøy, Norway.
- 1992: - ale desti!/- ikke mer! (complain and grief song, Lule Same/Norwegian). Illustrations by Rodrigo Concepcion Melches. Publisher: Th. Blaasværs Forlag, Kristiansund, Norway.
- 1993: soaje/venger, together with Kari Waag (poetic stories, Lule Same/Norwegian). Cover illustration by Lilian Urheim. Publisher: Th. Blaasværs Forlag, Kristiansund, Norway.
- 1994: tsåhke ja vájmmo (poetic story, Lule Same). Cover illustration by Lilian Urheim. Publisher: Bágo, Bøstad, Norway.
- 1994: det dobbelte hjerte (poetic story, Norwegian). Cover illustration by Lilian Urheim. Translation of the book tsåhke ja vájmmo in Lule Same (1994). Publisher: Bágo, Bøstad, Norway.
- 1994: gålmåsuorak, together with Anita Synøve Nergård and Kåre Tjihkkom (poetic story and poems, Lule Same). Cover illustration by Lilian Urheim. Publisher: Bágo, Bøstad, Norway.
- 1995: gávtsát (poetic story, Lule Same). Publisher: Bágo, Bøstad, Norway.
- 1998: Bádur báhtar (poetic story, Lule Same). Cover illustration by Stig Riemmbe Gaelok. Publisher: Davvi Girji, Karasjok, Norway.
- 2021: Gasskarájen (prose poems, Lule Same). Illustrations by Sissel Horndal. Publisher: ABC-Company E-skuvla, Karasjok, Norway.
- 2024: Midtveis (prose poems, Norwegian). Illustrations by Sissel Horndal . Translation of the book Gasskarájen in Lule Same (2021). Publisher: ABC-Company E-skuvla, Karasjok, Norway.

=== Children´s books ===
- 1992: GIHTTSE, GÁJTTSA, BÅHTTJE. Photographs by Kjell Ove Storvik (Lule Same). Publisher: Th. Blaasværs Forlag, Kristiansund, Norway.
- 1999: Báhkoståhkusa. Illustrations by Sigrid Kristine Knutsen (Lule Same). Publisher: Davvi Girji, Karasjok, Norway.
- 1999: Biehtár ja Duommá jávren stulliba. Photographs by Kjell Ove Storvik (Lule Same). Publisher: Davvi Girji, Karasjok, Norway.
- 2000: Biehtár ja Duommá háhkabivdon. Photographs by Kjell Ove Storvik (Lule Same). Publisher: Davvi Girji, Karasjok, Norway.
- 2010: Gáhtto mij máhtij vájmojt suddadit/Gaahtoe mij meehti vaajmojde sjilkehtidh/Bussá mii máhtii váimmuid suddadit. Illustrations by Katarina Pirak Sikku (Lule Same/South Saemien/North Sami). Publisher: Baldusine, Tromsø, Norway.
- 2011: Katten som kunne smelte hjerter. Translation of the book Gáhtto mij máhtij vájmojt suddadit/Gaahtoe mij meehti vaajmojde sjilkehtidh/Bussá mii máhtii váimmuid suddadit in Lule Same/South Saemien/North Sami (2010). Illustrations by Katarina Pirak Sikku (Norwegian). Publisher: Baldusine, Tromsø, Norway.
- 2023: Sájvvatjáhtje. Illustrations by Ulrika Tapio Blind (Lule Same). Publisher: ABC-Company E-skuvla, Karasjok, Norway.
