= List of chairpersons of the Sami Parliament of Sweden =

This is a list of the chairpersons that the Sámi Parliament of Sweden has had since its establishment on January 1, 1993:

Name	Political party	Entered office	Left office
Lars-Jon Allas	Renägarförbundet	1993	1997
Lars Wilhelm Svonni	Samerna	1997	2001
Olov J. Sikku	Min Geaidnu	2001	2005
Sylvia Simma,	Sámiid Riikkabellodat	2005	2009
Stefan Mikaelsson	Skogssamerna/Vuovdega	2009	2017
Paulus Kuoljok	Samelandspartiet/Sámiid Riikabellodat	2017	2021
Daniel Lyngdorf Vinka (formerly known as Daniel Holst)	Jakt- och Fiskesamerna	2021	2025
Johanna Njaita	Samelandspartiet	2025	
