= Sámi Parliament of Sweden =

Elected political body for the Sami people in Sweden

Sámi Parliament in Sweden Sámediggi (Northern Sami) Sametinget (Swedish)

Type
- Type: Unicameral

History
- Founded: 1 January 1993
- Preceded by: Swedish Sámi Council

Leadership
- Speaker: Daniel Lyngdorf Vinka, Hunting and Fishing Sámi since 31 August 2021

Structure
- Seats: 31
- Political groups: Hunting and Fishing Sámi (12); Sámi Land Party (7); The Morning Star (6); Forest Sámi (2); Swedish Sámi National Party (2); The Sámi (1); Our Way (1)

Elections
- Last election: 2025
- Next election: 2029

Meeting place
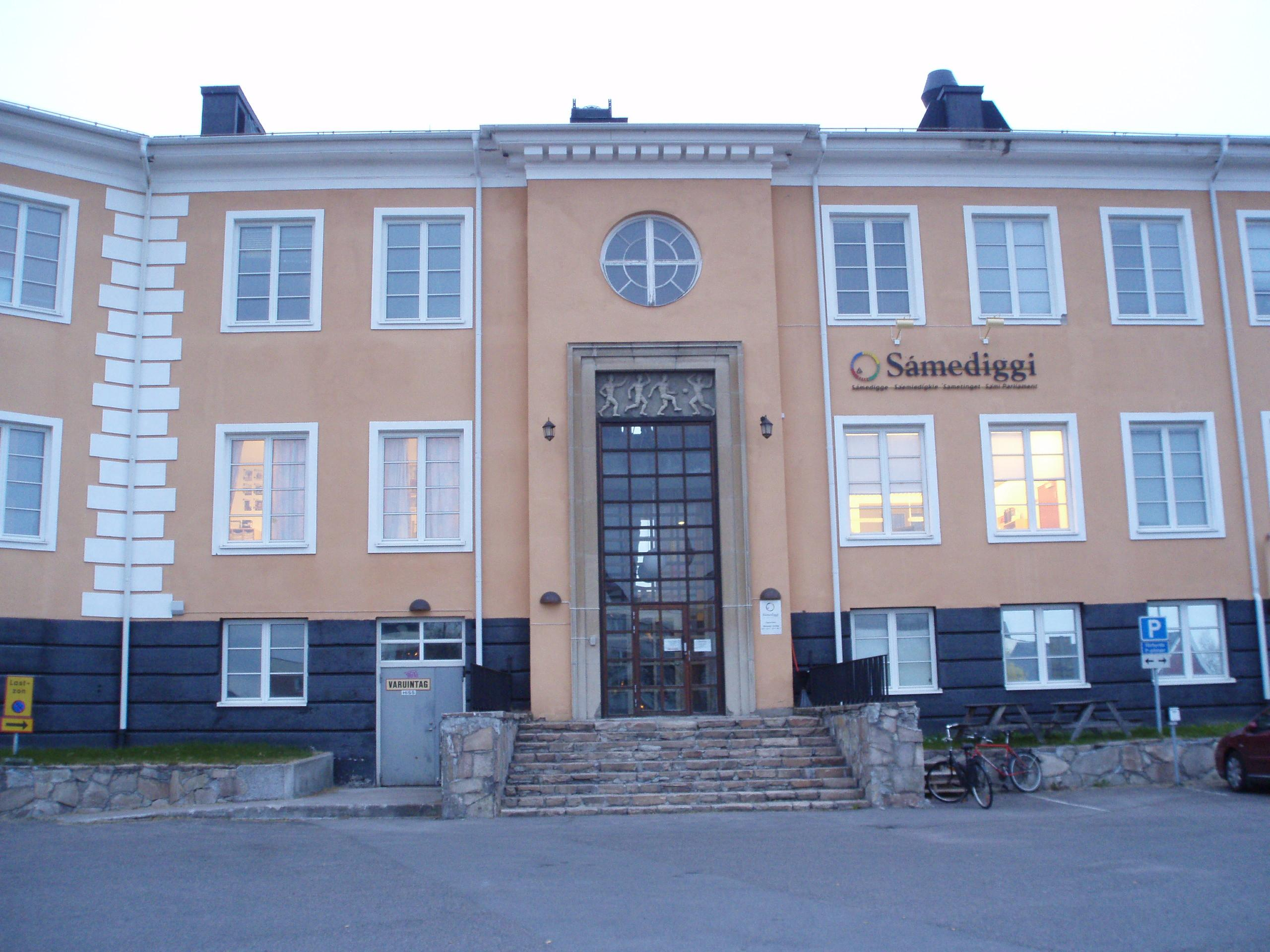
- Sámi Parliament of Sweden Building; Kiruna, Sweden

Website
- www.sametinget.se

The Sámi Parliament of Sweden (Swedish: Sametinget, Northern Sami: Sámediggi, Lule Sami: Sámedigge, Southern Sami: Saemiedigkie) is the representative body for people of Sámi heritage in Sweden based in Kiruna. It acts as an institution of cultural autonomy for the indigenous Sámi people.

== History ==
The Sami Parliament Act, Sametingslag (1992:1433), established the Swedish Sami Parliament as of 1 January 1993. By law, the first official elections were held on 16 May 1993. Its first session was opened by the King of Sweden, Carl XVI Gustaf, on 26 August 1993 in Kiruna. It has 31 representatives, who are elected every four years by general vote. The current chairperson of the Sámi Parliament is Paulus Kuoljak, since 2017. The chairperson is formally assigned by the Swedish Government upon the proposal of the Sami Parliament.

The 2021 election was held on 16 May 2021, with 9,220 people registered as voters, mostly living in Norrbotten or Västerbotten.

== Responsibilities ==
Sweden has taken this active part for two reasons:

- to recognise the Sámi minority as an indigenous people to distinguish it from other minorities;
- to raise the Sámi minority influence which comes into conflict with the European majority democracy system, i.e., the group with the most votes wins.

== Elections and voting system ==
Sámi Parliament is democratically elected and acts as an autonomous authority. Sámi inhabitants have a vote, in addition to the regular elections in Sweden, to elect representatives to the Sámi Parliament if:

- they identify as culturally or ethnically Sámi, and either
  - they speak a Sámi language, or
  - they have had or have a parent, or grandparent, that speaks or spoke a Sámi language

== See also ==
- List of Chairpersons of the Sami Parliament of Sweden
- Sámi politics
- Sámi Parliament of Finland
- Sámi Parliament of Norway
- Sámi Parliament of Russia
