= Isak Saba =

Norwegian Sami teacher and politician (1875–1921)

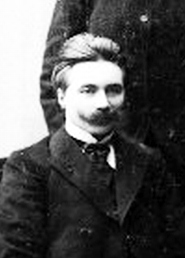
- Isak Saba, 1906
- Born: 15 November 1875; Reppen, Nesseby, Norway
- Died: 1 June 1921 (aged 45); Vardø, Norway
- Occupation(s): Politician, teacher, poet
- Known for: Member of Parliament (1906–1909); Member of Parliament (1910–1912)
- Spouse: Marie Gunneva Hansdatter Holm (m. 1905)
- Parents: Per (Peder) Sabasen (Sabbasen) (1832–1900); Bigi (Britha) Henriksdatter Aikio (1834–1908)

Isak Mikal Saba (15 November 1875 – 1 June 1921) was a Norwegian Sámi teacher and politician. He was born in 1875 in Nesseby Municipality in Finnmark county, Norway to Per Sabasen and Bigi Henriksdatter Aikio. Saba married Marie Gunneva Hansdatter Holm (1876–1961), daughter of Hans Holm Olsen and Marit Gulbrandsdatter. On 11 October 1906 he became the first Sámi to be elected to the Stortinget (Norwegian parliament), and he was the representative of Finnmark for the Norwegian Labour Party from 1907 to 1912. He was the mayor of Nesseby Municipality from 1914 to 1915. After serving as mayor, he worked as a teacher until his death.

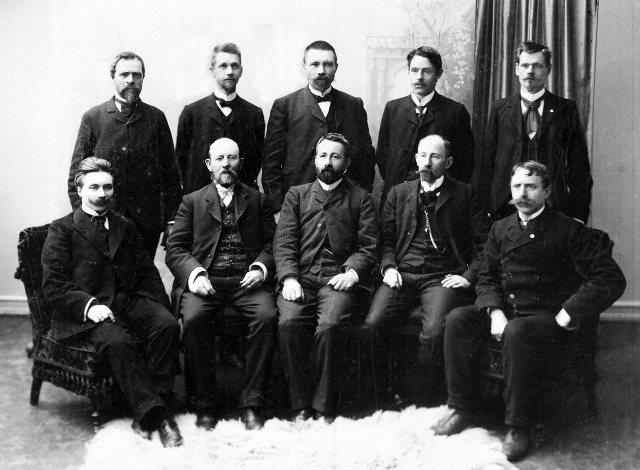
Labour parliamentary group 1906; Saba left in the lower row.

Saba wrote the text to Sámi soga lávlla, which the Sámi Conference made the Sami national anthem in 1986.

Saba died in 1921 in Vardø.
