= Kola Sámi Association =

Organization of Sámi people in Murmansk Oblast, Russia

Pennant of the Kola Sámi Association

Kola Sámi Association (Kildin Sami: Куэлнэгк Соаме Э̄хтнэгк; Russian: Ассоциация Кольских саамов; Northern Sami: Guoládaga Sámi Searvi) is a public organization founded in 1989 to support Russian Sámi living in Murmansk Oblast and to promote their culture and languages. Its headquarters are in Murmansk, Russia.

As of 2020, Elena Yakovleva Semenovna serves as the association’s president.

The Kola Sámi Association is a member of the Russian Association of Indigenous Peoples of the North (RAIPON) and, together with the Association of Sámi in Murmansk Oblast, a member association of the Saami Council.
