= Áššu =

Norwegian Sámi newspaper

- Type: twice-weekly newspaper
- Format: tabloid
- Owner: Aviisa AS
- Editor-in-chief: Ánte Bals
- Launched: October 28, 1993
- Ceased publication: January 22, 2008
- Language: Northern Sámi
- Headquarters: Guovdageaidnu, Norway
- Country: Norway
- Circulation: 1,008 (in 2007)
- ISSN: 0805-4754

Áššu was a Northern Sámi-language newspaper published twice a week and distributed across Norway, Sweden, Finland, and Russia. In 2008, Áššu ceased publication to merge with the rival paper Min Áigi to form Ávvir.

== History ==
Áššu (the word áššu translates into English as "glowing embers") launched in October 1993 as a rival to Min Áigi, which had launched earlier that year following the bankruptcy of the influential Sámi Áigi newspaper. Headquartered in Guovdageaidnu, Norway, the paper was published by Aviisa AS and co-owned by Nordavis AS. Despite having a readership across Sápmi, Áššu was positioned as a more local, traditional newspaper compared to the more political and nationally oriented Min Áigi.

== Merger ==
On 27 August 2007, Áššu and its rival Min Áigi announced plans to merge to create a Northern Sámi-language daily newspaper, Ávvir. A week after Áššu published its final issue, Ávvir launched on 6 February 2008, the Sami National Day. Min Áigi chairman Magne Svineng stated that due to higher production costs, mergering Áššu and Min Áigi was the only way to meet the need for a daily Sámi-language newspaper with wide distribution. Ávvir maintained editorial bureaus in Kárášjohka and Guovdageaidnu, the respective headquarters of Min Áigi and Áššu.

== Circulation ==
Number of Subscribers
2000	2001	2002	2003	2004	2005	2006	2007
969	1,003	1,127	1,117	1,084	1,021	975	1,008

== See also ==
- Min Áigi
- Ávvir
