= Association of Sámi in Murmansk Oblast =

The Association of Sámi in Murmansk Oblast (OOSMO; Russian: Общественная организация cаамов Мурманской области and Northern Sami: Murmanskka guovllu Sámesearvi) is an association founded in 2002 for the Sámi people living on the Kola Peninsula in the far northwest of Russia.

Its two main centers of activity are located in Lovozero and Revda, i.e. the main areas where the Sámi live in Russia.

Like the Kola Sámi Association, the Association of Sámi in the Murmansk Region has a seat on the Saami Council.
