= Sámi anthem =

Sámi national anthem

Sámi soga lávlla
English: Sami national anthem
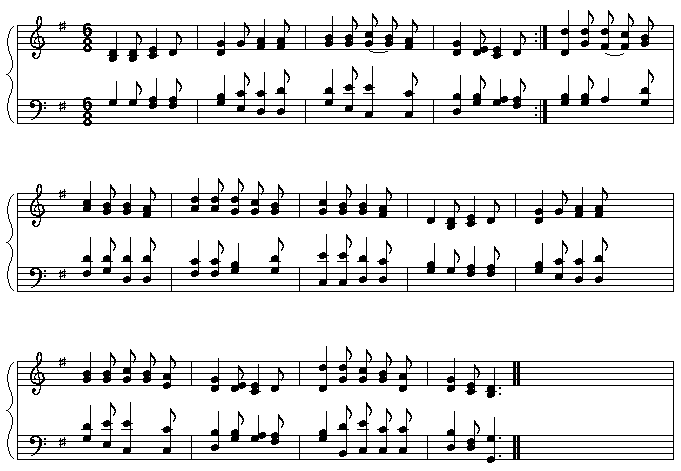
- Sheet music
- Regional anthem of Sápmi
- Lyrics: Isak Saba, 1 April 1906
- Music: Arne Sørli, 1992
- Adopted: August 1986

Sámi soga lávlla (English: Song of the Sami Family/People) is the anthem of the Sámi people. The text was written by Isak Saba, and Arne Sørli composed the music. Originally a poem, it was first published in the Sámi newspaper Saǥai Muittalægje on 1 April 1906. Sámi soga lávlla has been translated into most of the Sámi languages.

== History of the anthem ==
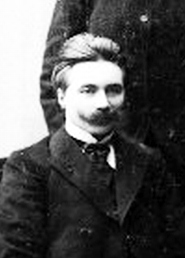
Isak Saba

The poem Sámi soga lávlla was written by Norwegian Sámi Isak Saba, a Norwegian school teacher and a researcher of Sami folklore and politics from Unjárga Municipality. In 1906, he became the first Sami to be elected to the Norwegian Parliament (he was a deputy in 1906–1912). The poem was first published on 1 April 1906 on front page of the first issue of Sagai Muittalægje, a Northern Sami language Norwegian newspaper.

In August 1986, during the 13th Sámi Conference in Åre, Sweden, Sámi soga lávlla was declared the national anthem of the Sami. The music was written for the poem by Norwegian composer Arne Sørli, and in 1992 it was approved as the score for the national anthem at the 15th Sámi Conference in Helsinki, Finland.

== Lyrics ==
=== Lyrics in Sámi ===
	Northern Sámi: Sámi Soga Lávlla	Skolt Sámi: Sääʹmsooǥǥ laull	Inari Sámi: Säämi suuvâ laavlâ
Listen:	Northern Sámi Sámi soga lávlla (mp3)	Skolt Sääʹmsooǥǥ laull (mp3)	Inari Sámi Säämi suuvâ laavlâ (mp3)
Translated by:	original lyrics	Sinikka Semenoja and Anni Feodoroff	Matti Morottaja
Lyrics:	1. Guhkkin davvin Dávggáid vuolde; sabmá suolggai Sámieanan. Duottar leabbá duoddar duohkin, jávri seabbá jávrri lahka. čohkat čilggin, čorut čearuin allanaddet almmi vuostái. Šávvet jogat, šuvvet vuovddit, cáhket ceakko stállenjárggat. máraideaddji mearaide.	1. Kuʹǩǩen tâʹvven Juuʹse vueʹlnn, Sääʹm čiõkk, Sääʹm jânnam. Tuõddâr kuâsttai tuõddâr tueʹǩǩen, jääuʹr špelkka jääuʹr veâlgga. Ceägg tuõddâr čokk laaǥǥ, pajjnaʹdde ââʹlm vuâstta. Šuâlee jooǥǥ, šuuvee väär, ceägg njaarǥ ruʹvddrââʹdd cäkkâʹtte šuârm miâr vuâstta.	1. Tääbbin tavveen Távgái vyelni; mist lii stuorrâ Säämieennâm. Tuodâr liäbbáá tuoddâr tyehin, jävri šiärráá jäävri alda. Čoheh čielgijn, čoroh čuumâin alanedeh alme vuástá. Šäävvih juuvah, šuveh vyevdih, cäähih ciägu stälinjaargah meendu muávroo meerâ siis.
Lyrics:	2. Dálvit dáppe buolašbiekkat, muohtaborggat meariheamit. Sámisohka sieluin mielain eahccá datte eatnamiiddis: Mátkálažžii mánuheabit, giđđudeaddji guovssahasat, - ruoškkas, ruovggas rođuin gullo, juhca jávrriin, jalgadasain, geresskálla máđiid miel.	2. Vaččai tääiʹb lie täʹlvv fiõlli, piõgg da porgg lie meäʹrteʹmes. Sääʹm sokk siõlin miõlin tõndiõtt väimstes rääʹǩǩast jânnmes. Joođjid, määtklaid mään čuâvad, tâʹvven pueʹlle kuuskõõzz ââʹlmest. Ruåčkâs, ruõvggâs rååđain kollai, groom teâudd jääuʹrid, jieʹğğid. Čeʹrres kuâlkkân täʹlvvǩeäiʹn mieʹldd.	2. Tälviv tääbbin puolâšpiegah, muotâpuurgah merettemeh. Säämi suuhâ siäloin mieláin iäccá kuittâg enâmijdis. Máđháliist láá mánutteveh, kiđordeijee kuovsâkkâsah, ruoškâs, ruovgâš roođoin kulloo, juucâ jaavrijn, jolgâdâsâin, kerrisskaalâ maađij mield.
Lyrics:	3. Ja go geassebeaivváš gollut; mehciid, mearaid, mearragáttiid, golli siste guollebivdit suilot mearain, suilot jávrriin. Gollin čuvget čáhcelottit, silban šovvot sámieanut, šelgot čuoimmit, šleđgot áirrut, luitet olbmát lávllodemiin geavgŋáid, guoikkaid, goatniliid.	3. Na ǥo ǩieʹss peeivaž kållad, mieʹccid, miârid, jäuʹrr’reeddaid, kåʹllǩimaldõõzzâst kueʹllšiiʹlli soʹǩǩe miârin, soʹǩǩe jääuʹrin. Koʹllen čueʹvve čääʹcclåådda, silbbân čueʹvve Sääʹmveerd, čuâlmma čuâlmain, leädggad ääirain, soʹǩǩe, lueʹštte oumma lääuʹleeʹl kuõškid, ǩeâuŋsid, sâvvnid.	3. Já ko kesipiäiváš páštá; meecijn, meerâin, merâriddoin, kole siste kuálásteijeeh suiloh meerâin, suiloh jaavrijn. Kollen čyevih čäcilodeh, silbân kolgeh Säämi juuvah, šiälguh čyeimih, šliäđguh ááiruh, lyeštih almaah lávlustâlân kiävŋáid, kuoškâid, kuánilijd.
Lyrics:	4. Sámieatnan sohkagoddi –; dat lea gierdan doddjokeahttá goddi čuđiid, garrogávppiid, viehkes vearrevearroválddiid. Dearvva dutnje, sitkes sohka! Dearvva dutnje, ráfi ruohtas! Eai leat doarut dorrojuvvon, eai leat vieljain varat vardán sámi siivo soga sis.	4. Sääʹmjânnam sokk’kåʹdd; tät lij ǩeârddam koddjireeisaid, koʹddičuuđid, kårrkaauʹpid, smuuđ veäʹreld piiđvaʹlddjid. Tiõrv Tuʹnne, siʹtǩǩes sokk tiõrv, rääʹǩǩes rääuh maadd! Jeäla tuäraid tuärrvuättam, jeäla viilljeez võõr vuârdtama saaʹmi sijvâs sooǥǥ seʹst.	4. Säämieennâm suhâkodde; tot lii killám toijuuhánnáá koddee čuuđijd, karokaavpijd, viehis veriviäru väldeid. Tiervâ tunjin, si hes suuhâ! Tiervâ tunjin, ráávhu ruotâs! Tust láá suáđih sođâhánnáá, viiljâin vorrâ vardehánnáá. Sijvo suuhâ sämmilâš!
Lyrics:	5. Máttarádját mis leat dovle; vuoitán vearredahkkiid badjel. Vuostálastot, vieljat, miige sitkatvuođain soardiideamet! Beaivvi bártniid nana nálli! Eai du vuoitte vašálaččat, jos fal gáhttet gollegielat, muittát máttarmáttuid sáni: Sámieatnan sámiide!	5. Maaddârääʹjj meeʹst lie tuuʹl; vuäittam veäʹreld tueʹjjeei pâʹjjel. Vuâsttlâʹsttep viillj, mij še, sitkkâdvuõđin suäʹrddeejeem! Sokk rääʹves Peiʹvvpäärnai ij tuu vueiʹt vâjjlažžad jõs veâl määttak kåʹllǩiõlad, mooštak maaddâr maddji saaʹnid: Sääʹmjânnam saaʹmi lij!	5. Madâräijiheh láá tovle; vuáittâm verrušeijee vievâid. Vuástálistup viiljah mij-uv si hesvuo áin suárdálâsâid Peeivi parnij noonâ nääli, iä tuu vyeiti vajaliihkin, jis tun toolah kollekielâd, muštáh maddârijdâd sääni: Säämieennâm sämmiláid!

	Lule Sámi: Sáme mátto lávla	Southern Sámi: Saemiej Laavlome	Alternate Southern Sámi: Saemie eatnemen vuelie	Kildin Sámi: Соаме шурьмусе ла̄ввл
Translated by:	Sigga Tuolja-Sandström	Ella Holm Bull	Anna Jacobsen	?
Lyrics:	1. Allen sjuhtjunisáj vuolen; dåppen ráfes Sámeednam; Duottarduogen duottar vuojnnu Jávre sledju lahkalakkoj Tjåhkå allen, båre tjäron allánaddi alme vuossti Jågå skåvvi, vuome sjåvvi Tsáhki tsäkko stállenjárga máradiddje merajda	1. Nuelesne dan elmien jissien; vååjnesh saemiej eatneme lea. Vaeriej duekesne guevtelh vaajjah, våaroen tjielke jaevrieh vååjnoeh. Dalvesh, vaerieh, vaartoeh, vuemieh alnadahkh elmeden vööste. Johkh vijtjeldieh vuejtieh sjuvvieh. Vaartoeh, gaejsieh, njiemehtje-spaenjieh tjåadtjoeh vøøste mearoem.	1. Noerhtenaestiej gïjken nueliem; soejmi Saemielaante jæjhta. Vaerieh vaeriej duekieh vååjnoeh, jaevrieh jaevriej dubpielisnie. Elmien vøøste vaartoeh, aesieh lokngesieh jïh vitnededtieh. Johkh jïh skåakh jis bursieh, sjuvvieh, kraevies praare baektienjuanah saelhtietjaetsiem dåastoehtieh.	1. Альмест чуввесь тоасьтэ вӯлленҍ Куххьккенҍ аляхт Соаме Е̄ммьӊе.; Па̄ххькк па̄кьк мӣлльтэ уйтант кукас, Ко̄лкэв эвтес ча̄зь ча̄зь мӣлльтэ. Урьтэ вуйв я е̄нас пагка Выммьдуэвма ле̄в алехь аллма. Коаввкэв ва̄рь, я ко̄ллкэв кӯшшк ёг. Кырртэв чӣӊӊлэс ёавьренҍ э̄ххтэ, Ко̄ммьтэсь нэ̄ммьпьесь ме̄рэнҍвя̄л.
Lyrics:	2. Dálven dáppe ruosstebiekka, muohta bårgåt mieredagi Sámevierrek sielujn mielajn ähttsá gåjt val ednamijdes Vájaldiddje mánnodihpen libjudiddje guovsagisá ruosjkasj, ruovgas rådojn gullu juhtsa jávrijn, jalggadisájn gieris skuolkat manádijn	2. Daelvege goss' vähtjaldahke; tjuatsa, elmie, gåaltoeminie. Läjhkan saemien-boelve eahtsa jijtse barkoeh, årroeh-sijjieh. Fealadäjjam aske tjuavka, goeksegh buelieh, naestieh gijkieh. Bovtsen kraaje sermiej sisnie, jaevrieh vaegkieh govloeh sjuevvieh, gierehtsh råantjoeh daelvege.	2. Garre daelvien bïegke, baajkoe, værtoe, væhtjedh, vesties hovme. Saemien såelien gåetiedajveh darhke saemien vaajmoen lïhke. Fealadæjjah baalkah tjuevkieh, aske, goeksegh, naestieh gijkieh. Stråmhpoej sisnie govloe råavka, johke sjåvva, baaroeh bursieh, gierehtsh daelvie-baalkine.	2. Та̄лльва чоавч ле̄в шӯрр та̄ввь е̄ммьнесьт, Вэ̄зэнҍ вӣ ллькесь коаххтал ёабьретҍ Ӣӊкэнҍ са̄мь мӣн о̄ллмэ то̄ӆӆькьев Пуадта вӣресь ва̄рне кӯтҍкетҍ. Воафсхэсс сӣрант та̄лльва кыдта, Пӯдзэ пэ̄гант куллай ла̄ввлэнҍ. Роатткъев э̄лл па̄кь нёллькесь ёавьренҍ, Ке̄ресь мэ̄ннэв раст я чӯлл ча̄р, Вэ̄ннса налла налла кэскэсьт нэмпэ.
Lyrics:	3. Ja gå giessebäjvásj gålli; miehtsijt, merajt, merragáttijt gålle sinna guollebivdde suvdos merajn, suvdos jávrijn gållen tjuovggi tjáhtjelåtte silbban guojtti sámeäno sledju stákko, sledju ájro loujtti ålmmå lávludalle bårssjo guojkajt åkkijda	3. Giesege goss' biejjie guaka; vaerieh vuejtieh jaevrieh klienjieh. Mearoeh jaavretjh, baaroeh guedtieh, klienjesne dah gøølijh vååjnoeh. Tjaetsien-ledtieh dah aaj klienjieh, johkh goh silph dah vååjnoeh gelkieh. Aajroeh klijkieh aajroeh klienjieh, almetjh aavoen almetjh juejkieh stoerre jeanoem våålese.	3. Gosse giesiebiejjie guaka, vaerieh, vaartoeh, saelhtiegaedtieh. Gøølijh gullieklienjiedahken soejmi saelhtieh, sovvenh suvkieh. Tjaebpies tjaetsieledtieh klienjieh, johkh goh sïlpejeanoeh vååjnoeh. Staahkoeh vååjnoeh, aajroeh gijkieh. Almetjh laavloen vuelkieh sovken, garseraejkiem, sovvenh, johkh.	3. Поашт пе̄ййв вӯлкхалл нюлэтҍ е̄ммьнье, Воаретҍ, ёавьретҍ, ме̄рр э̄лл нэмпэтҍ, Касьт таввь о̄ллмэ шыллев коалль кӯль. А̄ввт со̄нн лонҍтэтҍ йхесь поаззксэнҍ. Сыллпэнҍ вуаӆӆк мӣн са̄мь е̄ммьне. Рынтэсьт о̄ййкьювв, арьй лыэшшт ча̄дза, Сугкал тавас, вуаййпе нэмпэнҍ, Мугка вуэссь и аннта соннӭ Аллма кӯшкэ э̄лл ла̄вл кыррьтэв.
Lyrics:	4. Sámeednam, máttoguodde, dat lea gierddam doaddjudagi gådde tjudijt, rievvudagájt sluogas vierrevärroválldijt Rámmpo dunji, sávres máddo Rámmpo dunji, ráfes ruohtsas Älla doaro doaroduvvam, älla vieljaj vará varddám sáme sijvos mátto sin	4. Saemien eatneme jih saemieh; eah leah annje jaavoelamme. Fåjjoeh tjuvrieh åesiestäjjah faelskies skaejhvieh skaehtie-fåvhtah. Vyörtegs veaksehks saemien boelve! Vyörtegs raffies saemien boelve! Ij naan dåara saemiej gaskem, ij naan virre galkasovveme. Raeffie saemien boelvesne.	4. Saemielaanten såeliej maadtoe; jijnjem ååjseme dan guhkiem. Tjuvrieh, vesties gærroedæjjah, faelskies skaehtie-kriebpesjæjjah. Aavodh, – nænnoes saemien såelie! Aavodh, – raeffien roehtsen dålle! Idtjin saemieh gåessie dåaroeh ij leah gåssie saemiej luvnie vïellen vïrre varrteme.	4. Соаме ммьне шэ̄ннтад ко̄нҍтэтҍ.; Ке эйй та̄ххтма кадцьсе е̄ммьнян. Са̄мь никенн ейй та̄ххтма коаннҍтэ, Вӣлье ве̄р ейй аннта ко̄ллкэ. Ӣге са̄ммьля ло̄ссесь вуэзесь, Кӣршэ со̄нн пугк аннтма рэ̄зэтҍ. Тӣррв, са̄мь олма, агесь кӣрршэй! Тӣррв мыр шоабшей роавас вуэнҍтэсь! Лувьтэнҍ ча̄рэсьт выйей агесь.
Lyrics:	5. Máttarájdá sij li dålen; vuojttám vierredahkkij badjel Vuosstálasstup, vielja, mij aj sávrrudagájn vuolediddjáj Biejvemánáj gierddis máddo duv e vuojte vasjulattja jus val várri gållegielat Mujttit máttarmáttoj bágojt Sámeednam sámijda	5. Dovletje lea mijjen maadtoe; miedtiejidie baajhtestamme. Mijjieh aaj, viellh vuastalibie vueliedäjjah tjimkes-laakan! Biejjien baerniej veaksehks maadtoe! Eah edtjh datnem fäjjoeh nåhkehtidh, jis geehth jijtjedh gullie-gielem, måjhtah maadtoen bihkedassem: Saemien eatneme saemide!	5. Maadtoen vieksiesvoeten gaavhtan; vesties vuekie tjoeri tjijtedh. Mijjeh dovne vuastalibie, dejtie gieh edtjieh mijjem dibledh. Biejjien baerniej vieksies maadtoe! Ih galkh gåessie ååjsehtalledh gosse gïelem buektehth geehtedh, aahkaj aajjaj baakoeh mujhtedh: Saemien dajveh saemide!	5. Моаннтар а̄й, а̄к ӣллень, вӯххьтеэнҍ Пугк шӯрр рэ̄зэтҍ е̄рркъя па̄лесьт.; Быдт э мыйе буаййпе бйльйням, Пыххта я̄лэн ло̄сстэгуэйм шӯрр. Са̄ммыля тоавас, шэ̄ннтъта пӣйвенҍ, Ев ля рэ̄з то̄н буххьтэ вуайченҍ, Кӣлант коалль вуанч пынне эбтэс, Моаннтар а̄янт соаг ва̄льт е̄ррма: Соаме ва̄пткэсь Е̄ммьне Соаметв!

=== Lyrics in other local languages ===
	Finnish: Saamen suvun laulu	Norwegian Bokmål: Samefolkets sang	Russian: Национальный гимн саамов	Swedish: Sameättens sång
Translated by:	Otto Manninen	Jacob Børretzen	Juha Janhunen and Tatiana Narlykovoy (Note: The second, third and fourth verses were translated by Arkady Kuznetsov in 2006.)	?
Lyrics:	1. Kaukaa alta seitsentähden Lapin kulma kuumottavi; aava Turjan tunturisto järvi järven tuolla puolen, valtahiset harjat, huiput kohoo kohti ilman kantta, joet joikaa, korvet kaikaa, niemet pystyt, rautarinnat, työntyy tyrskymerta päin.	1. Langt mot nord under Karlsvognen; sakte stiger Samelandet: Vidde seg bak vidde strekker, sjø ved sjø hvor øyet rekker. Lier, åser, snaue rabber hever seg mot himmelbrynet. Elver bruser, skoger suser, stålgrå, steile fjell-nes skyter mot det ville hav seg ut.	1. Под Медведицей Большой; вдали синеет край Саамов, гора уходит за горой, вода мелькает за водою, грады вершин и гребни сопок стремятся к небу высоко, шумят леса, текут там реки, стальные мысы достигают пространств волнующих морей.	1. Nordvart genom Karlavagnen; ser du Samelandet skymta: Fjäll bak fjäll i fjärran blåna, sjöar sträcka sig vid sjöar, bergens branter, fjällens toppar höja sig mot själva himlen, bäckar brusa, skogar susa, tvärbrant stupa stålgrå uddar strävande mot stormigt hav.
Lyrics:	2. Tuimat tääl' on talven viimat, tuulet, tuiskut määrättömät, Saamen suku sieluin, mielin silti rakastavi maitaan; kulkijalle kuudan hohtaa, roihuavat pohjanpalot, poro pärskyy koivikossa, melu täyttää järvet, jängät pulkankolke talvitiet.	2. Vintertid med storm og kulde, snefokk uten mål og måte. Sameslekten dog av hjertet henger med sitt hjem og yrke. For en vandrer månen skinner, nordlys flimrer, stjerner tindrer. Reingrynt høres mellom krattet, sus og brus fra sjø og slette, pulkestøy langs vintervei.	2. Здесь зимой метель и стужа, Бури снежные кружатся, Но саамов род вовеки Только эту землю любит. Нам луна в дороге светит Вместе с северным сияньем, Снам берёз олени внемлют, Надо льдом, над снежным полем - Свист саней в дороге зимней.	2. Frosten härjar här om vintern, yrsnön vräks av vilda vindar, ändock älskar sameätten denna jord av allt sitt hjärta: Månens ljus en färdman fägnar, flygga norrskensflammor fladdra, klövkäpp, rengrymt hörs bland snåren, ut på insjön, över slätten, slamrar släden vägen fram.
Lyrics:	3. Taas kun kesäpäivän kehrä; kultaa metsät, meret, rannat, kalamiehet meren, järven kultakimalteessa keinuu, kultasotkat soutaa, soiluu hopeoina Lapin virrat, välkkyy airo, vilkkuu sauvoin, miehet laskee lauleskellen kosket, könkäät, suvannot.	3. Og når sommersolen gyller; fjell og skoger, hav og strender, fiskere i gullglans gynger, gynger stilt på hav og innsjø. Gyllent glinser svømmefugler og som sølv de store elver. Staker glimter, årer glitrer, Folket under sang det farer gjennom stiller, stryk og foss.	3. Летом солнце сыплет злато В волны, в скалы, на деревья, Рыбака качает лодка В золоте озёр и моря. И серебряные реки Шест, весло с журчаньем встретят. Запевают песню люди, Проплывая сквозь пороги И спокойной водной гладью.	3. Och när sommarns sol förgyller skogen, havet, havets stränder, guldomglänsta fiskefartyg vaggas utav vågor, gullhamn får var vattenfågel, strömmarna som silver glittra, åror blänka, stakar blixtra, under sång ses männen styra utför eda, fors och fall.
Lyrics:	4. Sortumatta Saamen heimo; kestänyt on vainolaisten tapporetket, kirokaupat, viekkaat väärän veron viejät. Terve, sitkeä sa heimo, Terve, rakas rauhan juuri, veljesriidan raastamaton, veljesveren vuotamaton Saamen heimo hiljainen!	4. Samelandets ætt og stamme; utholdt har og tålt så mange herjingstokter, bannskaps-handler, frekke falske skattefuter. Hill deg, seige samestamme! Hill deg, fredens rot og flamme! Aldri er der kamper kjempet, aldri broder-blod har runnet i den stille sameslekt.	4. Люди родины саамов Прямодушны и бесстрашны, Для врагов гроза незваных, Для пришельцев хитрых, злобных. Славься, крепкий род саамов! Славься, трудный путь свободы! Не бывало здесь сражений, Не пролилась здесь кровь братьев, Жил здесь в мире род саамский.	4. Lapplands släkte, sameätten, obräckt har sen mäktat utstå mördartjuder, slemma köpmän, sluga skattekrävarskaror. Hell, var hälsat, sega släkte! Hell dig fridens rot och fäste! Krigisk fejd har aldrig flammat, aldrig spilldes brödrablodet ibland Lapplands lugna ätt.
Lyrics:	5. Saivat esi-isät ammoin; voiton väärintekijöistä. Veljet, mekin torjukaamme sitkeästi sortajamme! Suku vankka Päivän poikain, ei sua voita vainolainen, kultakieltäs jos vain vaalit, taattojen jos neuvot muistat Saamien on Saamen maa!	5. Våre forfedre før har seiret; over dem som urett øvet. La oss også motstå, brødre, dem som vil oss underkue! Solens sønners seige avkom! Aldri skal du overvinnes om ditt gyldne språk du vokter, husker dine forfedres tale: Sameland for samene!	5. Наши предки победили; всех злодеев в старину и мы должны бороться, братья, упрямо с угнетателем! Народ ты крепкий, рожденный солнцем! Враги тебя не победят, язык свой только золотой храни, и предков древних слог запомни: саамам Саамскую Страну.	5. Våra fäder övervunno; vrånga våldsmän fordomtima, bröder låt oss likaledes strida segt emot förtrycket! Solens söner starka släkte! Dig kan ingen ovän kuva, blott ditt väna språk du vårdar, minnes forntidsfädrens maning: Sameland åt samerna!

=== Translation into English ===
	English:
Listen:	Instrumental Sámi soga lávlla (mp3)
Translated by:	Ragnar Müller-Wille and Rauna Kuokkanen
Lyrics:	1. Far up North 'neath Ursa Major; Gently rises Saamiland.; Mountain upon mountain. Lake upon lake. Peaks, ridges and plateaus Rising up to the skies. Gurgling rivers, sighing forests. Iron capes pointing sharp Out towards the stormy sea.
Lyrics:	2. Winter time with storm and cold Fierce blizzards.; Saami kin, with hearts and souls Their lands do love. Moonlight for the traveller, Living Aurora flickering, Grunt of reindeer heard in groves of birch, Voices over lakes and open grounds, Swish of sled on winter road.
Lyrics:	3. Summer's sun casts golden hues On forests, seas and shores.; Fishermen in gold, swaying With the golden seas, golden lakes. Silver Saami rivers gurgling 'round sparkling poles, shining oars. Singing, men float down Rapids, great and small, And waters calm.
Lyrics:	4. Saamiland's people With unbending strength Defeated killing enemies, bad trades, Sly and evil thieves. Hail thee, tough Saami kin! Hail thee, root of freedom! Never was there battle, Never brother's blood was spilt Amongst the peaceful Saami kin.
Lyrics:	5. Our ancestors long ago Trouble makers did defeat.; Let us, brothers, also resist Staunchly our oppressors. Oh, tough kin of the sun’s sons, Never shall you be subdued If you heed your golden Saami tongue, Remember the ancestors' word. The Saamiland for the Saami!
