= Sámi Conference =

International conference of Sámi people

The first international Sámi Conference was officially opened in Jokkmokk, Sweden on August 31, 1953 and closed four days later on September 3. Since then, the Sámi conferences have come to be important venues for the Sámi across Norway, Sweden, Finland and Russia to come together and discuss critical Sámi issues. Delegates have used the conferences as a forum to approve cultural symbols such as the Sami flag, the Sámi anthem Sámi soga lávlla, and Sami National Day.

== List of Sámi Conferences ==
Conference	Location	Main theme
XXII 2022	Gällivare, Sweden	
XXI 2017	Trondheim, Norway	Self-determination, rights to natural resources, Sámi languages
XX 2013	Murmansk, Russia	Sápmi 2053 - Sami culture and intensive industrial development
XIX 2008	Rovaniemi, Finland	
XVIII 2004	Honningsvåg, Norway	Sápmi for the Sámi
XVII 2000	Kiruna, Sweden	Self-governance
XVI 1996	Murmansk, Russia	Verddevuohta in the north — the Sámi model
XV 1992	Helsinki, Finland	The Sámi unite in Europe
XIV 1989	Lakselv, Norway	Self-governance
XIII 1986	Åre, Sweden	Tourism in Sápmi
XII 1983	Utsjoki, Finland	
XI 1980	Tromsø, Norway	Sámi political program
X 1978	Arjeplog, Sweden	
IX 1976	Inari, Finland	How do the Sámi live and why?
VIII 1974	Snåsa, Norway	Work and work methods at the (Nordic) Sámi Institute
VII 1971	Gällivare, Sweden	Sámi cultural policy
VI 1968	Hetta, Finland	Do the Sámi have a future in the Nordic Countries: Sámi, governmental and civil rights
V 1965	Tana, Norway	Sámi plans for the future
IV 1962	Kiruna, Sweden	Democracy and minorities
III 1959	Inari, Finland	Reindeer husbandry, language issues, etc.
II 1956	Karasjok, Norway	Scholastic and educational issues, natural resources and ways of making a living.
I 1953	Jokkmokk, Sweden	
