= Sámi National Day =

Nordic ethnic celebration

Day of the Sámi People
- Sámi flag
- Also called: Sámi National Day, Sixth of February
- Observed by: Sámi
- Type: Ethnic
- Significance: Celebrating the first international Sámi congress in Trondheim, Norway, February 6, 1917.
- Celebrations: Wearing national garment, attending concerts and culture events, eating national food, displaying flags
- Date: February 6
- Frequency: Annual
- Related to: Sápmi

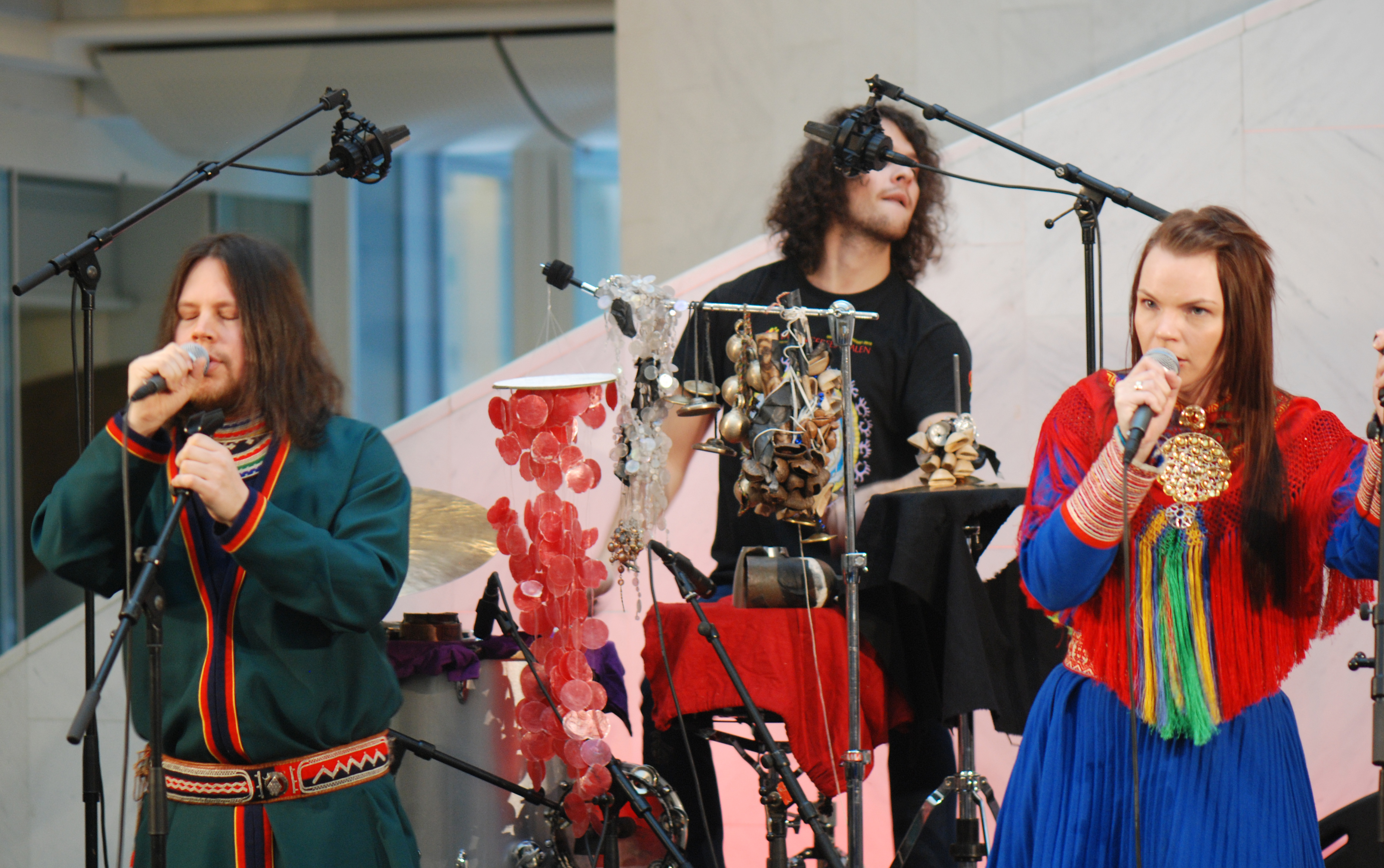
Sámi musical event in Oslo, Sámi National Day 2012

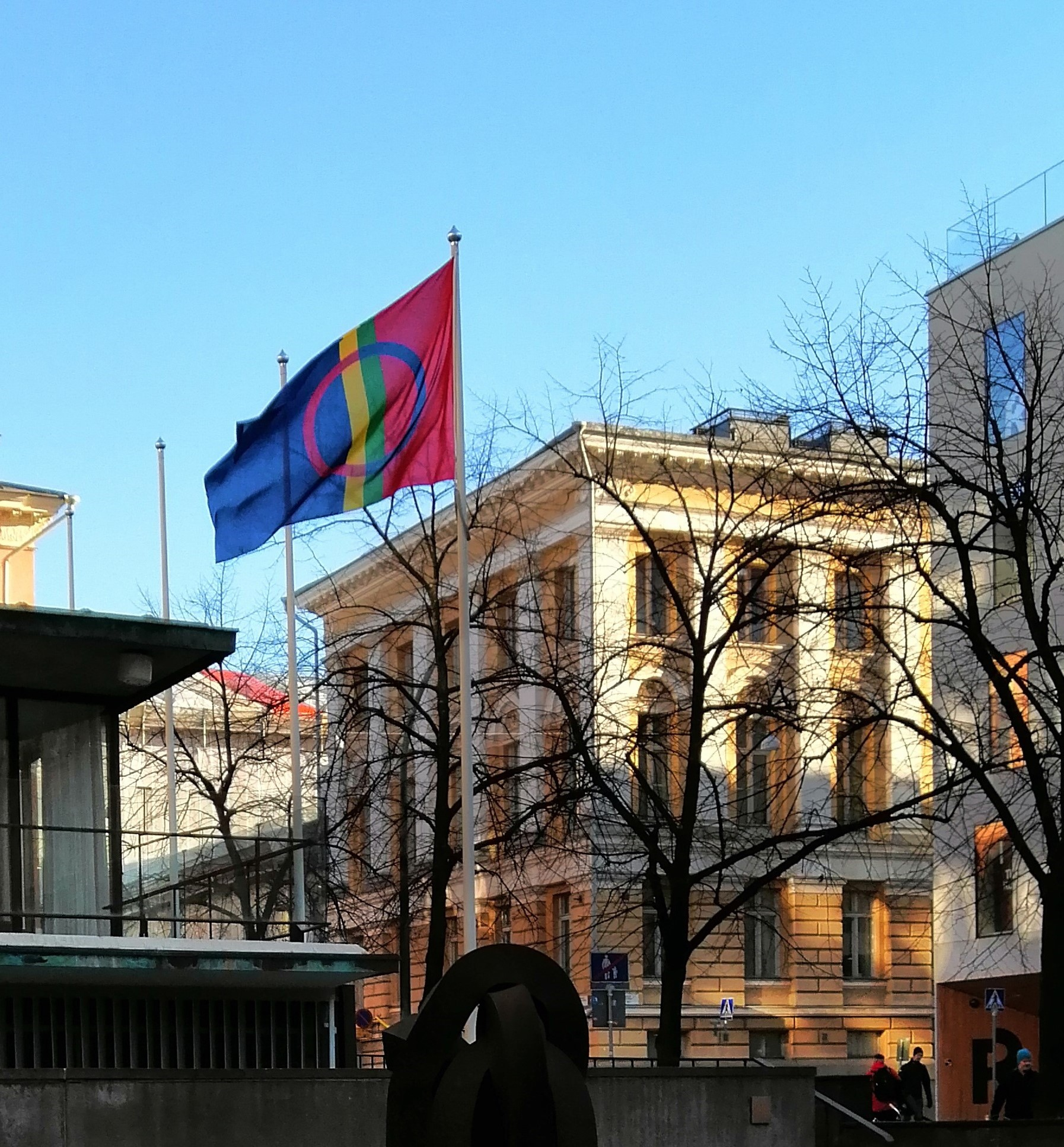
Sámi flag flying at the University of Helsinki on Sámi National Day

The Sámi National Day (Note: Northern Sami: Sámi álbmotbeaivi; Inari Sami: Säämi aalmugpeivi; Skolt Sami: Saaʹmi meersažpeiʹvv; Southern Sami: Saemiej åålmegebiejjie; Norwegian: Samenes nasjonaldag; Swedish: Samernas nationaldag; Finnish: Saamelaisten kansallispäivä) is an ethnic national day for the Sámi (Saami) people that falls on February 6, the date when the first Sámi congress was held in 1917 in Trondheim, Norway. The congress was the first time that Norwegian and Swedish Sámi came together across national borders to work on finding solutions to common problems.

In 1992 at the 15th Sámi Conference in Helsinki, Finland, a resolution was passed that Sámi National Day should be celebrated on February 6 to commemorate the first Sámi congress in 1917, that Sámi National Day is for all Sámi, regardless of where they live, and on that day the Sámi flag should be flown and the Sámi anthem sung in the local Sámi language. The first time Sámi National Day was celebrated was in 1993, when the International Year of Indigenous People was proclaimed open in Jokkmokk, Sweden by the United Nations.

Since then, celebrating the day has become increasingly popular. In Norway, it is compulsory for municipal administrative buildings to fly the Norwegian flag, and optionally also the Sámi flag, on February 6. Particularly notable is the celebration in Norway's capital Oslo, where the bells in the highest tower of Oslo City Hall play the Sámi national anthem as the flags are raised. Some larger places have taken to arranging festivities in the week around the Sámi National Day. The National Day has been included in the almanacs published by the University of Helsinki since 2004. The Norwegian, Swedish, and Finnish authorities recommend general flagging on the day.

By coincidence, February 6 was also the date representatives of the Sámi of the Kola Peninsula gathered annually to meet with Russian bureaucrats to debate and decide on issues of relevance to them. This assembly, called the Kola Sobbar, has been dubbed the "first Sámi Parliament" by the researcher Johan Albert Kalstad. However, the founding of the Kola Sobbar did not influence the choice of the date for Sámi People's Day, as the assembly existed only during the late 1800s and was largely forgotten until the early 2000s.

== See also ==
- Sámi anthem
- Sámi culture
- Waitangi Day
