= Sámi media =

Sámi-language and other Sámi-related media

Sámi media refers to media in one of the Sámi languages or media that deals with Sámi-related issues in Norwegian, Swedish, English or some other non-Sámi language. The establishment of Sámi media in Norway coincides with the rise in nationalism there in the late 19th century. Much of the Sámi media has met the same fate over the years and been felled by a lack of funding or by going bankrupt.

By far, the most important medium for the Sámi has been published material such as magazines and newspapers. With the advent of radio, however, radio rose to share the prominence enjoyed by published material.

== Publications ==
The majority of publications over time have been written in Northern Sámi, although often these same publications will include small sections written in some of the smaller Sámi languages. For the smaller languages, continuing publication is usually only guaranteed as long as someone volunteers to take on the task or has the energy to continue publication.

=== Northern Sámi ===
Muitalægje or Muittalægje čuvgetusa haliduvvidi sami gaskast (Tales for Sámi hungry for education/culture) was the first Sámi-language newspaper, founded by the Northern Sámi-speaking Norwegian Christian Andreasen. It was published for only two years, from 1873 to 1875. The purpose of this newspaper was to encourage the Sámi youth to look towards books for knowledge so they would learn more about the world outside the Sámi community.

In 1898, the next publication Nuorttanaste, a Christian monthly, appeared on the market. Nuorttanaste is still being published today, albeit only 11 times a year. Nuorttanaste has used a number of different orthographies, starting with the Friis orthography, which is the same orthography that was used for the 1895 Bible in Northern Sámi and is the one that the majority of Sámi past a certain age have learned. In 1948, the monthly switched over to the Bergsland-Ruong orthography, but due to reader complaints switched back to the Friis orthography again in 1960. Since the fall of 1992, Nuorttanaste has had articles written with both the Friis orthography and the 1979 orthography, which is the latest version to be approved and the one that is currently taught in schools throughout Sápmi.

Sami Usteb was another religious monthly, although a short-lived one, as only 57 issues were published by Norway's Lapp Mission. The first issue dates back to 1899, when two pastors, Jens Otterbech and Gudbrand Tandberg, decided to combine their efforts and write religious articles for the Sámi in their own mother tongue. Otterbech left northern Norway in 1902, after which Tandberg continued to write on his own for a year until its last issue in 1903.

Saǥai Muittalægje was yet another short-lived Sámi publication, with only 33 issues published from 1904 to 1911. It is, however, rather famous considering how short-lived it was due to the fact that it was the first place Isak Saba's The Song of the Sámi People was published on April 1, 1906. This poem would go on to become the anthem of the Sámi in 1986 after it had been set to music. In addition to his having penned the national anthem of the Sámi, Saba was also the first Sámi politician to be elected to the Norwegian Parliament. In this, the paper more than succeeded in its objective of making the Sámi more politically aware. Saba was also one of the two editors-in-chief at the paper, with Anders Larsen being the other one. After this publication folded, more than twenty years went by without any other Northern Sámi publication besides Nuorttanaste being published.

This hiatus ended with the launch of the predominantly Northern Sámi magazine Sábmelaš by the Sámi Čuvgehussearvi in Finland in 1934. This also heralded the birth of Sámi-language publications in Finland. Sámi Čuvgehussearvi published the magazine itself until 1945, when it was joined by the newly formed Sami Litto (the Sámi Union). Over the years, it changed its name to Sápmelaš to coincide with the current orthography. Until 1995, the magazine was financed by the Finnish government. After that, the Sámi Parliament in Finland provided financing for it until the magazine folded in 2001 once funding had dried up. Although neither of its first editors-in-chief, Paavo Ravila (1934–1943) and Erkki Itkonen (1934–1950), were Sámi, they were professors of Fenno-Ugric languages at the University of Helsinki in Finland. Because Sápmelaš was a magazine for all of the Sámi living in Finland, it also had articles in Inari Sámi and a few in Skolt Sámi.

Before 1979, Norway, Sweden and Finland all had their own orthography for Northern Sámi, but that year saw a common orthography created for all three countries. In order to efficiently disseminate the new orthography, a new newspaper, Sámi Áigi, was established that year in Karasjok Municipality. Sámi Áigi was, however, plagued by economic issues for the majority of its existence and it folded 10 years later when it finally went bankrupt. Four years later, in 1993, the newspaper was resurrected under the name Min Áigi.

Established in 1993, Min Áigi and its rival Áššu were both published twice a week just like Sámi Áigi had been until its demise. The two newspapers also had roughly the same circulation figures. Although the majority of their backers were different, they were jointly supported financially by the Norwegian Sámi Association, the largest Sámi organization in Norway. On August 27, 2007, Min Áigi and Áššu announced that they were merging in order to launch a new daily newspaper in Northern Sámi with a new editor-in-chief. The name of the new newspaper, Ávvir, was selected from names proposed by the newspapers' readership. The editorial bureaus of the two defunct newspapers are still located in Kárášjohka and Guovdageaidnu, i.e., the same place that their editorial bureaus were originally in. The first issue of Ávvir was released on February 6, 2008, which is also Sámi National Day.

Gába is a bilingual Sámi magazine that was published for the first time on International Women's Day (March 8) in 1996. The magazine is published six times a year by the Sámi women's forum Sami Nisson Forum, with articles dealing with the everyday life of the Sámi from a woman's perspective. Although its articles are mainly in Norwegian and Northern Sámi, occasionally they are written in Southern Sámi, Lule Sámi and Swedish, as well.

=== Inari Sámi ===
In 1987, a year after its founding, the Inari Sámi Language Association started publishing a monthly bulletin called Anáraš. It includes various types of literature, from poetry to children's stories and as such serves as a general publication for the Inari Sámi community.

=== Skolt Sámi ===
To date, the world's only quarterly printed in the Skolt Sámi language was Sääʹmođđâz (The Skolt News). It was published four times a year, with its first issue being printed in Finland in 1978 by editor-in-chief Satu Mosnikoff and several reporters and assistants. Sääʹmođđâz was distributed to every Skolt household and the members of the Skolt Supporters' Association as one way of disseminating the recently (1972) created orthography for the language. In addition, it was an important method of maintaining a sense of community in spite of the great distances between the three main Finnish Skolt communities of Sevettijärvi, Keväjärvi, and Nellim. The magazine had birth announcements, obituaries, wedding announcements, short stories written and illustrated by schoolchildren, news articles, official government and church announcements, and general interest stories. Each issue also had numerous photographs of the Skolt community. In spite of reaching the entire Skolt community residing in Finland, the last issue of Sääʹmođđâz was published in 1986 due to the difficulty of finding funding, a lack of reporters and the editor-in-chief being tired of publishing the magazine by herself.

=== Southern Sámi ===
Like so many of the early Sámi publications, the Southern Sámi also have their own multilingual church quarterly called Daerpies Dierie. This publication was founded in 1997 by its current editor-in-chief Bierna Bientie. Articles are published in Swedish, Norwegian or Southern Sámi. The articles cover a wide range of topics, from Sámi church life to more general news about the Sámi community.

Additionally, the newspaper Snåsningen (from Snåsa Municipality) carries a few articles in Southern Sámi each month.

=== Swedish ===
In 1904, the first and short-lived Swedish-language magazine, Lapparnes Egen Tidning (The Lapps' Own Newspaper), pertaining to the Sámi was established. It was published by the Central Lappish Union. By 1905, it folded after publishing a mere four issues. It did, however, set the scene for the arrival of its successor, Samefolkets Egen Tidning 13 years later.

Samefolkets Egen Tidning (The Sámi Peoples' Own Newspaper) was established by Torkel Tomasson, who served as editor-in-chief until his death in 1940. His post was then filled by Gustav Park, until 1960, when Professor Israel Ruong replaced him. This was also the same year that the magazine's name was shortened to its current Samefolket (The Sámi People). Articles in discuss matters close to the heart of the Sámi as well as to that of other indigenous people around the world. While it is mainly published in Swedish, it also has articles in Norwegian and the Sámi languages spoken in Sweden, i.e., Northern Sámi, Lule Sámi and Southern Sámi. The magazine is owned by two major Sámi organizations: Samernas Riksförbund and Same Ätnam.

=== Norwegian ===
Waren Sardne was a newspaper published in Norwegian for the Southern Sámi community. Founded in 1910 by Daniel Mortenson, who would serve as its editor-in-chief, it was published weekly on Saturday from its establishment until halfway through 1913, when double issues started being published. The thirty-fifth and thirty-sixth joint and final issue was published on December 27, 1913. Resurrected in July 1922, Mortenson once again took the reins and started publishing the newspaper again, this time as a monthly. Mortenson served as editor-in-chief until his death in 1924, at which point in time his son Lars Danielsen succeeded him in this post. From 1923 to 1924, the newspaper started to be published more often at twice a month. From 1925 on, Waren Sardne was published somewhat erratically, with issues not coming out or double issues appearing. By 1927, the newspaper had folded for the last time.

Ságat was the next Sámi newspaper to be published. Although the original idea of the newspaper was that its articles should be written in both Sámi and Norwegian, it uses Norwegian almost exclusively in its articles nowadays.

=== Academic journals ===
As Sámi languages received official status across Sápmi, a new emphasis on recognizing and furthering Sámi languages as languages for science, teaching, and administration. As academic institutions like the Sámi University of Applied Sciences in Guovdageaidnu, Norway, have placed an emphasis on the use of Northern Sámi language in the classroom, the need for peer-reviewed outlets for Sámi-language scholarship have arisen. Several academic journals regularly publish articles in Sámi languages, although most also accept articles in English, Norwegian, and other languages.

- Dieđut launched in 1974 by the Nordic Sámi Institute and now published by the Sámi University.
- Sámi Dieđalaš Áigečála launched in 1994 by Sámi University and the University of Tromsø Arctic University Center for Sámi Studies. It is notable for publishing articles only in Sámi languages (primarily Northern Sámi).
- Bårjås launched in 1999 by the Árran Lule Sami Center in Ájluokta, Norway.
- Dutkansearvvi Dieđalaš Áigečála launched in 2018 by Dutkansearvi, the Finnish Sámi language and culture research association, at the University of Helsinki.
- Suomalais-ugrilaisen Seuran Aikakauskirja: Journal De La Société Finno-ougrienne and Suomalais-Ugrilaisen Seuran Toimituksia: Mémoires de la Société Finno-ougrienne, both published by the Finno-Ugrian Society

== Television ==
1. Ođđasat
2. Unna Junná

== Film ==
1. Sámi Blood
2. Je’vida

== Radio ==
Across Sápmi, Sámi languages are carried by a range of radio broadcasters on traditional FM airwaves, as well as via digital radio and online streaming. The public-service broadcasters of Norway, Sweden, and Finland produce individually and in collaboration Sámi-language channels (primarily broadcasting in the Northern Sámi language), and several local broadcasters provide Sámi-language content too. Radio in particular has played an important role in building a sense of Sámi community.

- NRK Sápmi, the Sámi languages service of NRK, the Norwegian public service broadcaster
- Sameradion, the Sámi languages section of Swedish public service broadcaster Sveriges Radio; also operates as SR Sápmi online
- Yle Sámi Radio, the regional unit of Yle, the Finnish public service broadcaster
- Guovdageainnu Lagasradio (GLR), a Sámi community station in Guovdageaidnu, Norway
- Kola Sámi Radio, a local Kildin Sámi-language FM broadcaster in Lovozero, Murmansk, Russia

== Online media ==
Digital platforms, including social media, form an important part of contemporary Sámi media, enabling communication within geographically dispersed Sámi communities and with wider Nordic and international audiences. Sámi-language initiatives on YouTube, blogs, Twitter, and language-learning applications have been used to create and share learning resources and support language revitalization. Social media have also enabled Sámi perspectives to circulate beyond local networks and helped connect place-based protests to broader claims concerning Indigenous rights and self-determination. Research focused on Sweden has also highlighted how platform visibility may intensify disputes over representation and authenticity and create uneven burdens of moderation, translation, and public exposure.

== See also ==
- Davvi Girji
