= Northern Sámi orthography =

Different standards for writing the Northern Sámi language

The orthography used to write Northern Sámi has experienced numerous changes since the first writing systems for the language were developed. Traditionally, Norway, Sweden, and Finland — the three countries where Northern Sámi is spoken — used separate orthographies for teaching the Sámi within their borders. This changed in 1979 when a Saami Council-led effort to standardize a pan-Nordic orthography for Northern Sámi.

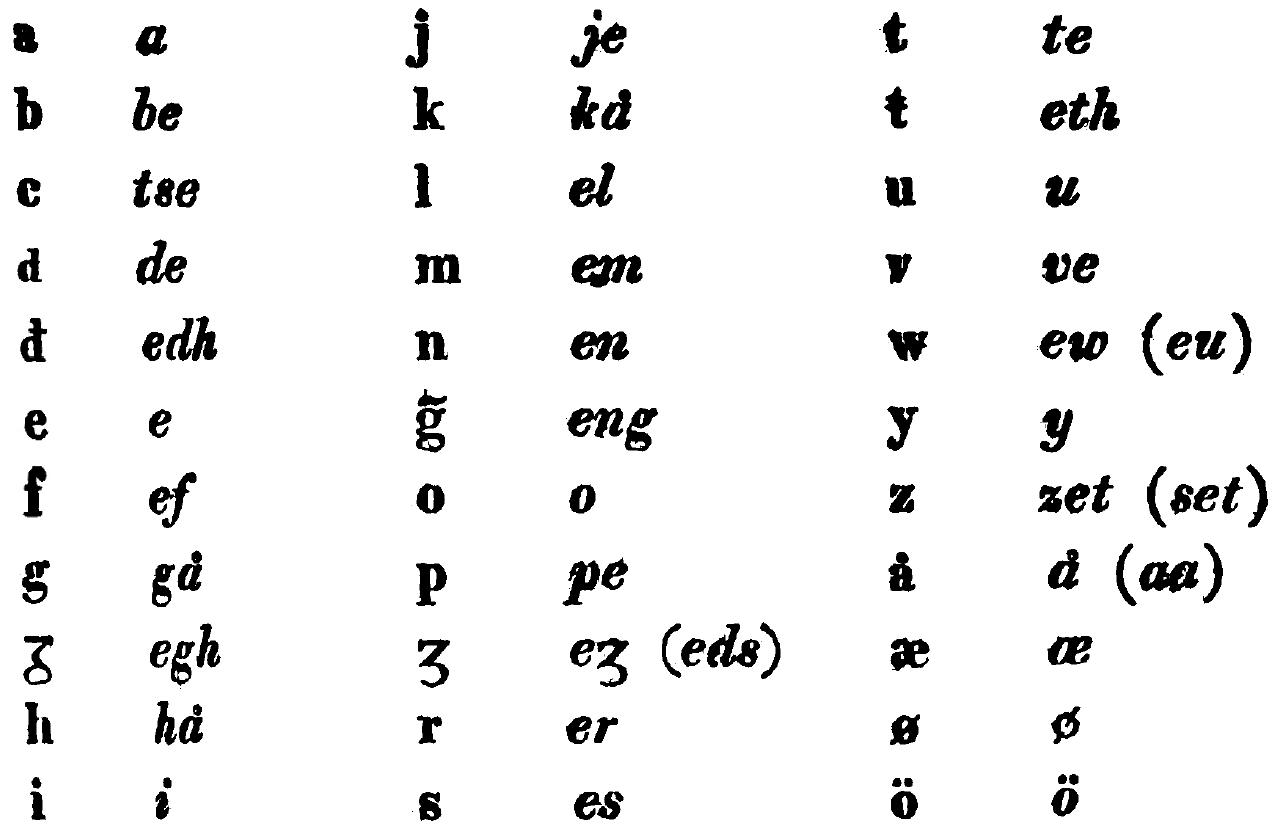
Alphabet used by Rask in Ræsonneret lappisk sproglære in 1832 with the special letters đ, ᵹ, ʒ, g̃, ŧ and letters borrowed from North Germanic languages, additional letters with diacritics not depicted in this table are used in the book: c̓, s̓, z̓, ʒ̓.

The roots of the current orthography for Northern Sámi were laid by Danish linguist Rasmus Rask, who, after discussions with Norwegian cleric Nils Vibe Stockfleth, published in 1832 Ræsonneret lappisk sproglære efter den sprogart, som bruges af fjældlapperne i Porsangerfjorden i Finmarken: En omarbejdelse af Prof. Knud Leems Lappiske grammatica [Reasoned Lappish Grammar According to the Language Used by the Mountain Lapps in the Porsangerfjord in Finnmark: A recast of Prof. Knud Leem's Lappish Grammar]. Rask established an orthography based on the principle of a single grapheme for each sound, i.e., it should be a phonemic orthography. All the Northern Sámi orthographies developed since 1832 trace their roots back to Rask's system. This means diacritics are used with some consonants (č, đ, ŋ, š, ŧ and ž), which caused data-processing problems before Unicode was introduced.

In 2006, Norwegian seventh grade students began to be taught the Northern Sámi alphabet as part of their lessons.

== The various orthographies ==
The region in parentheses following the name of the orthography or its inventor is where the orthography was used. It was only in 1979 that Norway, Sweden, and Finland had a common orthography for Northern Sámi.

- Knud Leem (Norway)
- Nils Vibe Stockfleth (Norway)
- J.A. Friis (Norway)
- Konrad Nielsen (in scientific works throughout the 20th century)
- Paavo Ravila (1934) (Finland)
- Erkki Itkonen (1951) (Finland)
- Bergsland–Ruong orthography (Norway, Sweden)
- 1979 orthography (Norway, Sweden, Finland)

== Background ==
Four main points were considered in launching new orthographies for Northern Sámi:

1. Knowing in principle the details of the orthography
2. Recognizing the linguistic changes that affect Northern Sámi
3. Selecting which dialect to use for the Northern Sámi literary language
4. Considering the Northern Sámi spelling in other countries

A common joke, although one with a grain of truth, is that the Northern Sámi orthography changed each time the professor of Sámi languages changed at the University of Oslo, i.e., with Nils Vibe Stockfleth, J. A. Friis, Konrad Nielsen, Knut Bergsland, and Ole Henrik Magga. However, this generalization is no longer true as the 1979 orthography was the result of a collective effort by Sámi from all three countries where Northern Sámi is spoken, working together to reach a consensus over a ten-year period.

== The Leem/Rask orthography ==
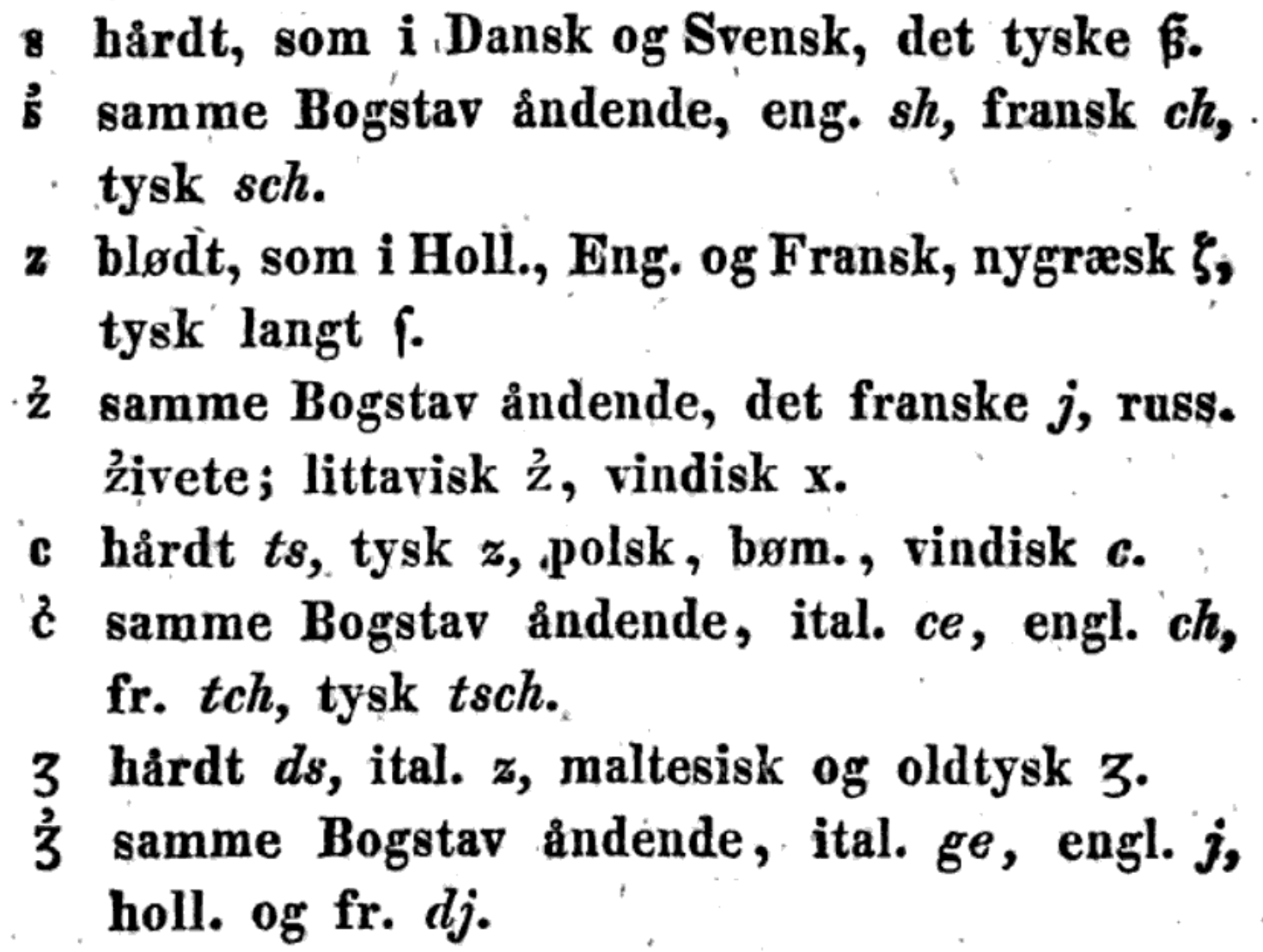
Rask’s Letters with comma above.

The alphabet used by Rask in Ræsonneret lappisk sproglære (1832) aimed to use a single grapheme for each sound, including c̓, s̓, z̓, ʒ̓ not shown in the chart below.

A a	B b	C c	D d	Đ đ	E e	F f	G g
Ᵹ ᵹ	H h	I i	J j	K k	L l	M m	N n
G̃ g̃	O o	P p	Ʒ ʒ	R r	S s	T t	Ŧ ŧ
U u	V v	W w	Y y	Z z	Å å	Æ æ	Ø ø
Ö ö

== The Stockfleth orthography ==
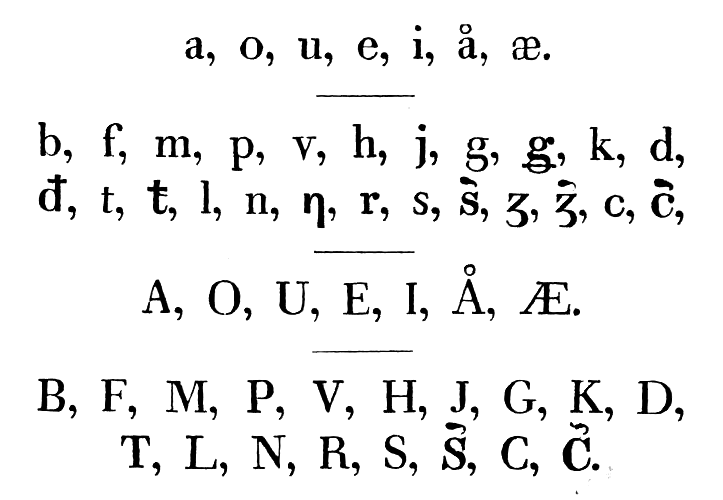
Alphabet used by Nils Vibe Stockfleth in Abes ja låkkam-girje in 1837.

Inspired by his conversations with Rask, Nils Vibe Stockfleth published a Sami grammar in 1837 that used several unique letters, including c̓ (tshje) and s̓ (eshi), as well as ǥ (gh), ƞ (engh), ʒ (eds), and ʒ̓ (edshi), which appeared only in lowercase forms.

А а	B b	C c	C̓ c̓	D d	Đ đ	E e	F f
G g	Ǥ ǥ	H h	I i	J j	K k	L l	M m
N n	Ƞ ƞ	O o	P p	R r	S s	S̓ s̓	T t
Ŧ ŧ	U u	V v	Ʒ ʒ	Ʒ̓ ʒ̓	Å å	Æ æ

== The Friis orthography ==
The Friis orthography was used in the Sámi version of the Bible published in 1895, as well as by the Sámi newspaper Muitalægje and Nuorttanaste, a religious publication of the Lapp Mission, which was first published in 1898. The one thing that sets the Friis orthography apart from the other orthographies used to write the various Sámi languages is that it is the one the greatest number of Sámi have learned over the past 100 years. It uses the same alphabet as Stockfleth did in Abes ja låkkam-girje with the elimination of the vowel Å å.

J.A. Friis starting working on translating the Bible into Northern Sámi as Stockfleth had only managed to translate the New Testament. In his translation work, Friis was notably assisted by people who spoke Northern Sámi as their mother tongue. In 1854, Friis was joined by Hans Jacobsen Hætta, who had been previously jailed in Kristiania following the Sami revolt in Guovdageaidnu. In 1874, their reworked version of Stockfleth's New Testament in Northern Sámi was published. Friis went on to also publish the Old Testament in cooperation with Lars Hætta and Norwegian linguist Just Knud Qvigstad in 1895. Qvigstad modified the Friis orthography to use an apostrophe to mark strong and extra strong consonants.

А а	B b	C c	C̓ c̓	D d	Đ đ	E e	F f
G g	Ǥ ǥ	H h	I i	J j	K k	L l	M m
N n	Ƞ ƞ	O o	P p	R r	S s	S̓ s̓	T t
Ŧ ŧ	U u	V v	Ʒ ʒ	Ʒ̓ ʒ̓	Æ æ

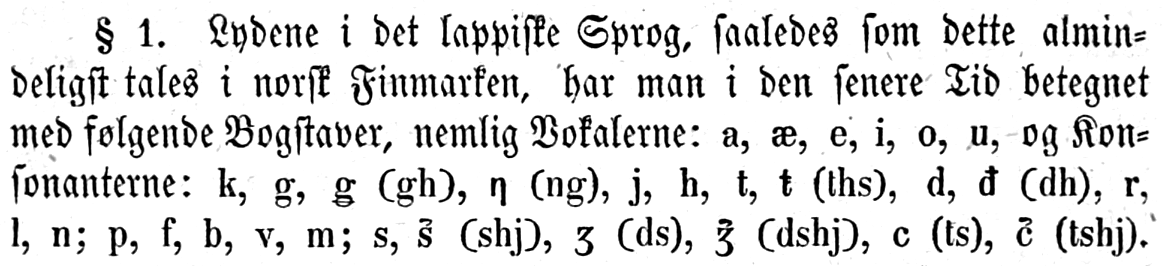
Alphabet used by Friis in Lappisk grammatik in 1856.

== The Nielsen orthography ==
Konrad Nielsen developed his orthography for use in his dictionary and textbooks. This orthography is still used when quoting examples of Northern Sámi in international Finno-Ugric works.

=== Vowels ===
The following table shows the correspondence between the vowels used in Nielsen's orthography and in the orthography approved in 1979.

Nielsen's orthography	a	â	e	i	o	u	æ
1979 – odd syllables	á	a	e	i	o	u	ea
1979 – even syllables	a	â	i	e	u	o	ea

== The Ravila orthography ==
Also, referred to as the Sámi Čuvgehussearvi orthography, was developed by Paavo Ravila in (1934) and was aligned to Finnish orthographic conventions, for example using p, k, and t instead of b, g, and d. It was modified in 1951 by Erkki Itkonen and continued to be used for Northern Sámi in Finland until 1979.

== The Bergsland–Ruong orthography ==
The Bergsland–Ruong orthography was developed by Knut Bergsland and Israel Ruong and was in use from 1948 to 1978 in Norway and Sweden. Only about 100 books were published in Norway using this orthography. The Nordic Sámi Institute journal Dieđut was originally published as Dieđot using the Bergsland–Ruong orthography.

А а	Á á	B b	C c	Č č	D d	Đ đ	E e
F f	G g	H h	I i	J j	K k	L l	M m
N n	Ƞ ƞ	O o	P p	R r	S s	Š š	T t
Ŧ ŧ	U u	V v	Z z	Ž ž	Æ æ	(Ø ø)	Å å

== The 1979 orthography ==
In 1979, the Saami Council approved a new pan-Scandinavian orthography for Northern Sámi, marking the first time a single writing system would be used in Norway, Sweden, and Finland. It quickly replaced previous orthographies. Minor revisions were made to the orthography in 1985.

А а	Á á	B b	C c	Č č	D d	Đ đ	E e
F f	G g	H h	I i	J j	K k	L l	M m
N n	Ŋ ŋ	O o	P p	R r	S s	Š š	T t
Ŧ ŧ	U u	V v	Z z	Ž ž

== Examples of the various orthographies for Northern Sámi ==
Extracts of text from the New Testament, Matthew 12:1–8.

=== English version (King James Version, Matthew chapter 12, verses 1–8) ===
At that time Jesus went on the sabbath day through the corn; and his disciples were an hungred, and began to pluck the ears of corn, and to eat. But when the Pharisees saw it, they said unto him, Behold, thy disciples do that which is not lawful to do upon the sabbath day. But he said unto them, Have ye not read what David did, when he was an hungred, and they that were with him; How he entered into the house of God, and did eat the shewbread, which was not lawful for him to eat, neither for them which were with him, but only for the priests? Or have ye not read in the law, how that on the sabbath days the priests in the temple profane the sabbath, and are blameless? But I say unto you, That in this place is one greater than the temple. But if ye had known what this meaneth, I WILL HAVE MERCY, AND NOT SACRIFICE, ye would not have condemned the guiltless. For the Son of man is Lord even of the sabbath day.

=== Nils Vibe Stockfleth 1840 ===
Damanaga aige de Jesus bældo čađa vagjoli sabbaten; mutto su mattajægjek bårrastuvvamen legje, ja gårne åivid si gasskegåtte, ja bårragåtte. Mutto go pharisæalaǯak dam oaidne, de si celkke sunji: gæč, du mattajegjidak dakkek, mi i læk låvalaš dakkat sabbaten. Mutto sån digjidi celki: æppetgo låkkam læk, maid David daǥai, go nælgost læi, ja su matke guoimek? Moft sån Ibmel tempel sisa manai, ja geččujume laibid bårai, maid bårrat i læm sunji låvalaš, ige su matke guibmidi, mutto dušše fal papaidi? Daihe æppetgå diu lagast låkkam læk, atte papak sabbaten sabbat eppebasotek tempel sist, ja ašetæmek almken læk? Mutto mån digjidi cælkam, dast sån læ, gutte stuorrab læ go gempel. Mutto jås di lifčidek diettam mi dat læ: armogasvuođa aigom, mutto åfferid im, de æppet læm dubmim ašetes olbmuid. Dastgo olbmu bardne hærra læ maida sabbat bagjel.

=== J.A. Friis 1874 (reworked by J.Qvigstad for the 1895 version of the Bible) ===
Damanaga aige vaʒi Jesus bældo čađa sabbaten; mutto su mattajægjek borastuvvagotte, ja ribme gasket gordne-oivid ja borrat. Mutto go Farisealaǯak dam oidne, de celkke si dudnji: Gæča, du mattajægjek dakkek dam, mi i læk lobalaš dakkat sabbaten. Mutto son celki sigjidi: Epetgo di læk lokkam, maid David daǥai, dalle go son nælggogođi, dalle go son ja si, guđek legje su mielde, legje nælggomen)? Moft son manai Ibmel vieso sisa ja borai geččujume laibid, maid sudnji i læm lobalaš borrat, ige sigjidi, guđek legje lokkam laǥast, atte papak æppebasotek sabbata tempelist ašetæmek? Mutto mon cælkam digjidi, atte son læ dast jos di dieđašeidek, mi dat læ: Mon lokom arkalmastemvutti ja im oaffaridi, de epet di livče dubmin ašetes olbmuid. Dastgo olbmu bardne læ hærra maidai sabbat bagjel.

=== Konrad Nielsen orthography ===
Dâmmânâgâ aige vāʒʒii Jesus bældo čâđâ sabbatin; muttŏ su mat'tajæg'gjek bǫrastuvvâgǭtti jâ rībmi gâs'ket gǫr'dnĕǭiviid jâ bǫrrât. Muttŏ gǫ farisēalâǯǯâk dâm ǫi'dni, de cel'ki sī sudnji: Gǣččâ, du mat'tajæg'gjek dâkkik dâm mi ī læk lǫbalâš dâkkât sabbatin. Muttŏ sǫn cēlkii siggjiidi: Ēppit-gǫ dī læk lǫkkâm, mâid David dâgâi, dâllĕ gǫ sǭn jâ sī guđik leggji su miel'dĕ, leggji næl'gomin, mǫvt sǫn mânâi Ibmel vieso sisâ jâ bǫrâi geč'čujume lāibiid, mâid sudnjii ī læm lǫbalâš bǫrrât, ī-ge siggjiidi guđik leggji su miel'dĕ, muttŏ dušše-fâl bāppâidi? Dâhjĕ ēppit-gǫ dī læk lǫkkam lāgâst, âttĕ bāppâk æppĕ-bâsotik sabbatâ tem'pëlist sabbat-bēivii, jâ læk âlmâke aššĕtæmek? Muttŏ mǫn čælkam diggjiidi, âttĕ dāst læ sǭn, gutti læ stuoreb gǫ tem'pël. Muttŏ jǫs dī dieđašeidĕk mī dât læ: mǫn lii'kum arkalmâs'temvūttii jâ im oaffâriidâ, de ēppit dī livči dub'mim aššĕtis ǫl'bmuid. Dâstgŏ ǫl'bmu bar'dne læ hær'ra mâidai sabbat bâggjĕl.

=== Bergsland–Ruong orthography (1948) ===
Dammanaga áigi vázzii Jesus bældo čađa sábbáhin; muttu su mát'tájæd'djit bårastuvvagåtte ja ribme gas'kis går'dniåiviid ja bårrat. Muttu gå fáriseálažžat dan åi'dne, de cel'ke sii sudnji: Gæčča, du mát'tájæd'djit dakket dan mii ii læt låbálaš dakkat sábbáhin. Muttu sån celkii siddjiide: Eppet gå dii læt låkkan, maid David dagai, dalle gå sån ja sii guđet leddje su miel'de, leddje næl'gome, måvt sån manai Ibmil vieso sisa ja bårai geč'čujumi láibiid maid sudnje ii læn låbálaš bårrat, ii ge siddjiide guđet leddje su miel'de, muttu duššefal báppaide? Dahje eppet gå dii læt låkkan lágas, atte báppat æppebasohit sábbáha tem'pelis sábbátbeiviid, ja læt almake áššehæmit? Muttu mån cælkán diddjiide, atte dás læ sån, gutte læ stuorit gå tem'pel. Muttu jås dii dieđášeidet mii dat læ: mån lii'kun árkálmas'tinvuttii ja in oaffariida, de eppet dii livče dub'men áššehis ål'bmuid. Dasgå ål'bmu bár'dni læ hær'rá maidái sábbát baddjel.

=== 1979 orthography ===
Dan áiggi Jesus lei oktii vázzimin gordnebealdduid čađa sábbáhin. Su máhttájeaddjit ledje nelgon ja čoaggigohte gordneoivviid ja borre. Farisealaččat oidne dán ja dadje sutnje: «Geahča! Du máhttájeaddjit dahket dan mii ii leat lobálaš sábbáhin!» Muhto son vástidii: «Ehpet go dii leat lohkan maid Dávvet dagai go son ja su olbmát ledje nealgumin? Son manai Ipmila vissui ja borai oaffarláibbiid maid sus ii lean lohpi borrat ii ge su olbmáin, muhto duššefal báhpain. Dahje ehpet go leat lohkan lágas ahte báhpat juohke sábbáha barget tempelis ja nu rihkkot lága, ja dattege leat sivaheamit? Mun cealkkán: Dá lea dat mii lea stuorit go tempel. Jos dii livččiidet ádden maid dát sátni mearkkaša: Váibmoláđisvuođa mun dáhtun, in ge oaffara, de ehpet livčče dubmen sivahemiid. Dasgo Olbmobárdni lea sábbáha hearrá.
