= Israel Ruong =

Swedish-Sámi linguist and politician

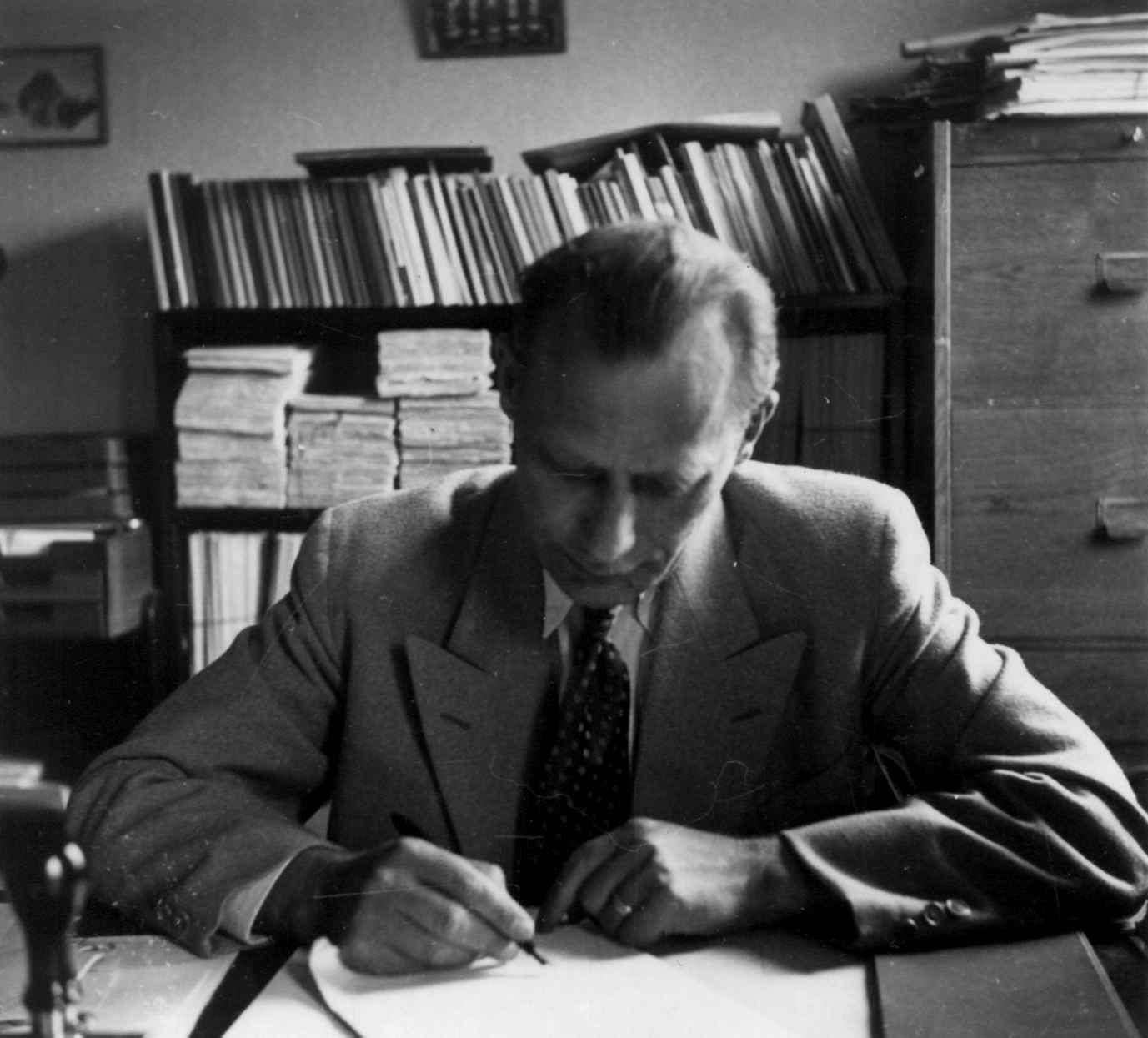
- Born: 26 May 1903; Arjeplog, Sweden
- Died: 6 April 1986 (aged 82)

Academic work
- Discipline: Sámi languages
- Institutions: Uppsala University

Israel Ruong (26 May 1903 − 6 April 1986) was a Swedish-Sámi linguist, politician and professor of Sámi languages and culture at the University of Uppsala in Sweden.

Israel Ruong spoke Pite Sámi as his mother tongue. His parents were catechists, who lived on the shores of Lake Labbas in the Sámi village of Harrok. His parents and a number of his siblings succumbed to the Spanish flu that rampaged through Arjeplog in 1920. His upbringing in Harrok is described in detail in his article "Harrok-ett samiskt nybygge i Pite Lappmark", which was published in the Festschrift for Asbjørn Nesheim entitled Kultur på karrig jord : festskrift til Asbjørn Nesheim. He received his training to become a teacher in Luleå, after which he went on to work as a teacher in the nomad school in Jukkasjärvi. In 1943, he defended his dissertation entitled Lappische Verbalableitung dargestellt auf Grundlage des Pitelappischen. From 1947 to 1967, he served as the inspector for nomad schools in Sweden.

Ruong served as associate professor in Sámi languages and Ethnology at the University of Uppsala from 1949 to 1969, at which point in time he was promoted to professor. As a linguist, Ruong worked on various aspects of the Sámi languages, especially on their morphology. Together with Knut Bergsland, he created the Bergsland-Ruong orthography for Northern Sámi in 1948. Thanks to the new orthography, Ruong was able to publish schoolbooks in Sámi. In 1970, he published a grammar book in Northern Sámi called Min sámegiella.

Ruong was also involved in Sámi politics and was one of the founding members of the Svenska Samernas Riksförbund (SSR) in 1950. He served as head of the SSR from 1959 to 1967. In addition to his political and educational work, Ruong also served as the editor-in-chief of the Sámi newspaper Samefolket from 1960 to 1973.

In 1983, the Israel Ruong Scholarship (Northern Sami: Israel Ruong stipeanda) was established by the Nordic Sámi Institute. Since 2007 it is awarded every other year to a researcher that works in one or more of the fields that Ruong himself was interested in.

== Brief bibliography ==
- Lappische Verbalableitung dargestellt auf Grundlage des Pitelappischen (1943)
- Studier i lapsk kultur i Pite lappmark och angränsande områden (1944)
- Formlära (1957)
- Niilas ja su sii'da (1965)
- Dovdagat ja bargot (1967)
- Samerna (1969)
- Min sámegiella (1970)
- Index till samefolkets egen tidning-Samefolket 1918–1973 (1985)
