= Gunvor Guttorm =

Gunvor Guttorm at University of Helsinki in 2019

Gunvor Guttorm (born 1958) is a Sámi artist, art historian, author and university teacher noted for her expertise in duodji.

== Life and career ==
Guttorm was born on June 28, 1958 in Karasjok, on the Norwegian side of Sápmi. She studied Sami, Finnish and Duodji at both the University of Tromsø and the University of Applied Sciences in Finnmark, now the UiT Arctic University of Norway. In 1993, she gained a Master's degree in duodji at a state teacher training college in Oslo. In 2003, at the University of Tromsø, she completed her Ph.D. with a thesis on duodji, and the visual experience of indigenous people. From 1994, Guttorm has taught duodji at the Sami University of Applied Sciences, Guovdageaidnu/Kautokeino in Norway, becoming a professor there in 2010, and then rector from 2015-2019. With colleagues, she started the first bachelor and master's programmes in duodji in Sápmi. Guttorm is a keynote speaker specialising in the transformation of duodji in contemporary times and the use of duodji as a way of reclaiming indigenous culture and of raising Sami self-esteem.

== Writing and exhibitions ==
Guttorm exhibits her own work. From 2016 -2018, Guttorm worked on an exhibition organized by the Office for Contemporary Art, (OCA) Oslo, co-editing "Let the River Flow. An Indigenous Uprising and its Legacy in Art, Ecology and Politics" co-published by (OCA) and Valiz, Amsterdam, 2020. She co-edited The Duodji Reader, published by Davvi Girji in cooperation with Norwegian Crafts. She is co-curator of, and an exhibitor in, Arctic Highways, a touring indigenous art exhibition with artists from Sápmi, Canada and Alaska. She also co-edited and contributed to the exhibition catalogue. Guttorm is the project leader, on the Norwegian side, of an EU-financed development project called Arctic Indigenous Arts and Design Archives. Guttorm is part of the making knowledge for sustainable transformations (MAST) network.

== Personal life ==
Guttorm has two children and lives in Jokkmokk, on the Swedish side of Sápmi.

== Selected publications ==
- Duoji bálgát - en studie i duodji: kunsthåndverk som visuell erfaring hos et urfolk (avhandling), Det humanistiske fakultet, Institutt for kunsthistorie, Universitetet i Tromsø, 2001
- Duodjáris duojárat – duddjon ealiha duodjedigaštallama – artihkkalčoakkáldat (på nordsamiska, "Hängivna hantverkare – Skapande föder dialog och debatt"), Davvi girji, Kautokeino 2010, ISBN 978-82-7374-815-7
- Guttorm, G. (2012), Duodji: A New Step for Art Education. International Journal of Art & Design Education, 31: 180-190.
- Guttorm, G. (2018) 'Traditions and traditional knowledge in the Sámi culture' a chapter in Being indigenous Routledge.
- Guttorm, G. (March 2018) 'Stories Created in Stitches' in Afterall A journal of Art Context and Enquiry 45:18-23
- Guttorm, G and Gaski, H. (Eds) (2022) The Duodji Reader Norwegian Crafts.

Guttorm is the main editor of the journal Dieđut.
