= Saǥai Muittalægje =

Norwegian Sámi-language newspaper

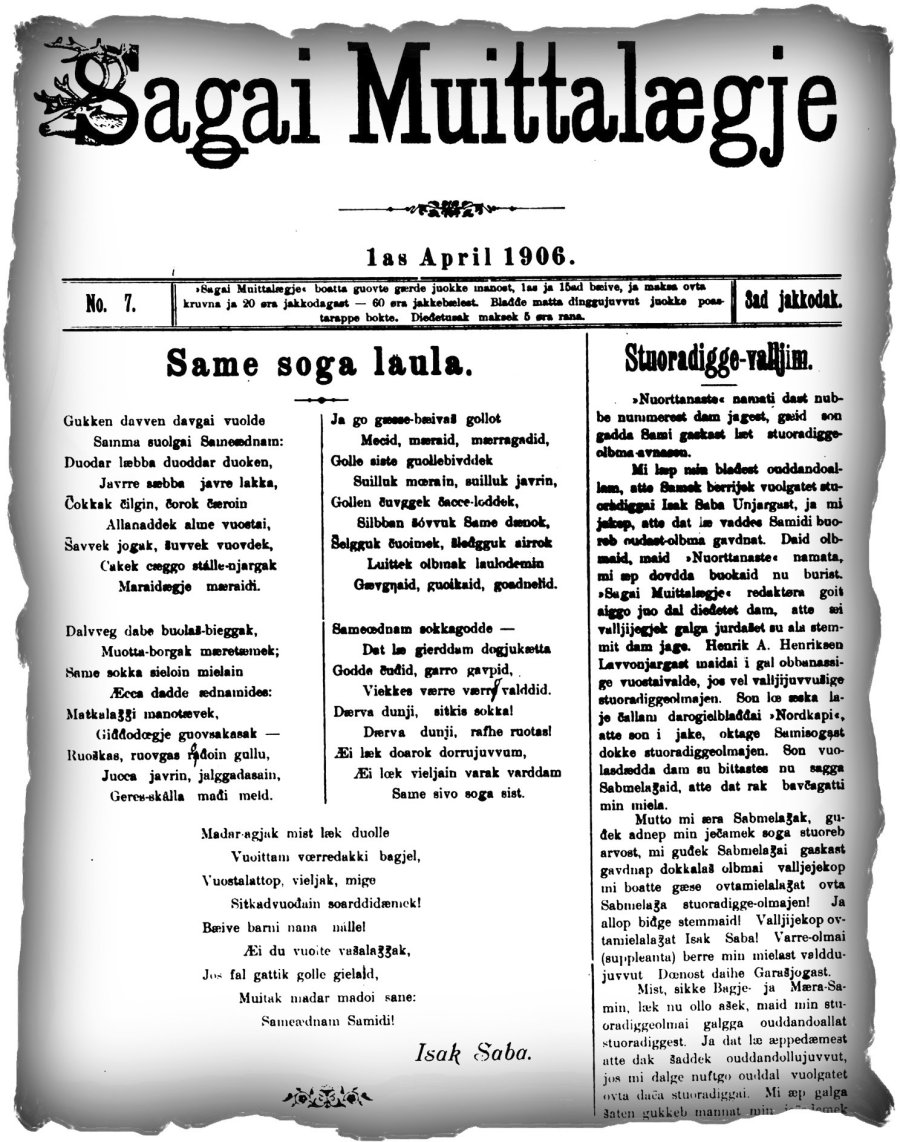
- Editor: Anders Larsen
- Launched: July 1904
- Ceased publication: September 1911
- Language: Northern Sámi
- Headquarters: Fálesnuorri, Norway

Saǥai Muittalægje was an early Sámi newspaper published twice a month from July 1904 to September 1911. Although only 33 issues were published, Saǥai Muittalægje played an important role in building Sámi identity and supporting opposition to Norwegianization policies. It is considered the first Sámi political newspaper.

== History ==
Saǥai Muittalægje (in modern Northern Sámi orthography Ságaid Muitaleaddji), which means "The News Reporter," was founded by teacher and journalist Anders Larsen in Fálesnuorri, Norway. It was published on a press owned by Gustav Lund that also printed the Nuorttanaste Sámi Christian newspaper.

At the time of the paper's founding, Norway was putting increasing pressure on its Sámi and Kven populations to assimilate and identify as Norwegians. By publishing in Northern Sámi, Saǥai Muittalægje stood in direct opposition to this Norwegianization policy. It published its last issue in September 1911 due to financial difficulties.

Saǥai Muittalægje is famous for being where Isak Saba's "Sámi Soga Lávlla" (The Song of the Sami People), the Sámi anthem, was first published, on the front page of the 1 April 1906 issue, as a poem. Saba and Larsen were friends and Saǥai Muittalægje supported Saba in his successful 1906 race to become the first Sámi elected to the Storting. Saba was a member of the Norwegian Labour Party and he was supported by a coalition of socialists and Sámi activists who helped re-elect him in 1909. The folding of Saǥai Muittalægje in 1911 contributed to Saba's failed re-election attempt in 1912.
