= Nesheim =

Nesheim may refer to:

== Places ==
- Nesheim, Voss, a village in Voss municipality in Vestland county, Norway
- Nesheim, Rogaland, a village in Stavanger municipality in Rogaland county, Norway
- Nesheim, Vaksdal, a village in Vaksdal municipality in Vestland county, Norway
- Nesheim Church, a church in Vaksdal municipality in Vestland county, Norway
- Nesheim Bridge, a bridge near McVille, North Dakota, United States

== People ==
- Asbjørn Nesheim, Norwegian linguist and curator known for his research on the Sámi languages and cultural history
- Berit Nesheim, Norwegian film director
- Daniel Te'o-Nesheim, American football defensive end
- Helge Sverre Nesheim, Norwegian radio and television host
- John Nesheim, American author and venture capitalist who teaches entrepreneurship at Cornell University
- Robert Nesheim, American nutritionist who worked for Quaker Oats
