= Bientie =

Bientie is a surname. Notable people with the surname include:

- Anne-Grethe Leine Bientie (born 1954), Norwegian writer and psalmist
- Bierna Bientie (born 1951), Norwegian priest and editor of Daerpies Dierie

== See also ==
- Bienias
