= Dieđut =

- Language: English
- Edited by: Gunvor Guttorm

Publication details
- Former name: Dieđot
- History: 1974–present
- Publisher: Sámi University of Applied Sciences (Norway)
- Open access: Hybrid

Standard abbreviations
- ISO 4: Dieđut

Indexing
- ISSN: 0332-7779

Links
- Journal homepage

Dieđut is a peer-reviewed academic journal published by the Nordic Sámi Institute (in Guovdageainnu Municipality, Norway). It features articles on social sciences, linguistics, and law. It was originally established to publish research findings from the Nordic Sámi Institute, but since 2005 has been affiliated with the Sámi University of Applied Sciences.

Dieđut (which translates from Northern Sámi into English as "information") began publishing in 1974, and prior to the establishment of the 1979 pan-Scandinavian Northern Sámi orthography the title was spelled Dieđot, using the Bergsland–Ruong orthography for Northern Sámi.

Some years the journal publishes only a single issue, but in other years it has published as many as seven. Issues contain both monographs and article collections. The journal also publishes a number of articles as open access via its website. The journal is classified as "Level 1" in the Norwegian Scientific Index and the Finnish Julkaisufoorumi index.

The bulk of the articles are produced by employees of the Sámi University of Applied Sciences. Publication languages include Northern Sámi and other Sámi languages, as well as Norwegian, Swedish, Finnish, English, and Russian. Dieđut is the second-most common outlet for Sámi University scholars publishing in Northern Sámi.
