= Lajla =

1893 opera by Ole Olsen

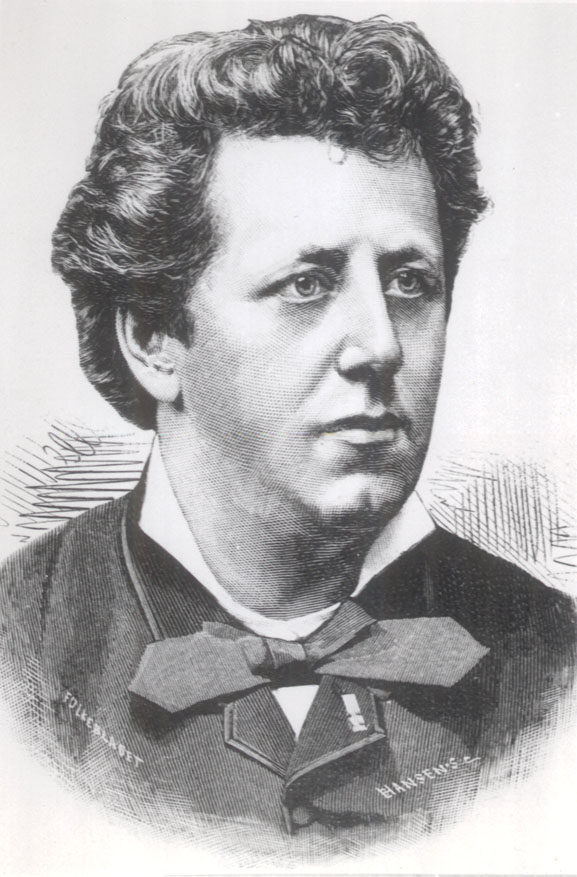
Ole Olsen

Lajla is an two-act opera by Norwegian composer Ole Olsen to his own libretto. It is set in the northern parts of Norway and is loosely based on the novel Lajla by Jens Andreas Friis (1881). It deals with the interaction between the Sami people and Norwegians. The opera was finished in 1893. August Cranz published its vocal score c. 1899, and a German version of the libretto c. 1901 (translated by Wilhelm Henzen). Lajla is the only of four operas by Olsen to be staged during his life. Its first known performance took place on October 8, 1908 at the National Theatre in Oslo. In 2020 the opera was several times performed in concert version (with piano accompaniment).

== Roles ==
Role	Voice type	Premiere cast, 8 October 1908
Laagje, a Lapp tribe leader	Bass	Olav Voss
Lajla, his daughter	Soprano	Eidé Norena
Mellet, his brother's son	Tenor	Carl Hagman
Jaampa, keeper of Laagje's reindeer	Bass	Thorleif Sohlberg
Olav (Note: Spelled Olav in Norwegian, bur Olaf in the German libretto.) Lind, a Norwegian	Baritone	Halfdan Rode
Priest	Bass	Johannes Juel
Deacon	Tenor	Carl Struve
Maggi (Note: Only in the Juoige Scene.)	Mezzo-soprano/Alto	–
Norwegians and Lapps of both sex

== Plot ==
=== Act I ===
Autumn morning in the wide highlands of Finnmark. Dwarf birches and huge mossed rocks form the scenery. Just before the sunrise a young Lapp Mellet dressed in national summer garb, with a knife and a loop, sings about his love to Lajla, whose coming he awaits. As the song ends and the sun rises, he notices a man heading towards him. The stranger, a Norwegian, is looking for the tribe leader Laagje, of whom and his charming daughter Lajla he had heard much. Mellet warns Lind not to talk about the maiden, as she is already betrothed to someone. A pleasant song is heard from behind the scene: Lajla compares a dog catching game to a lad waiting for his beloved.

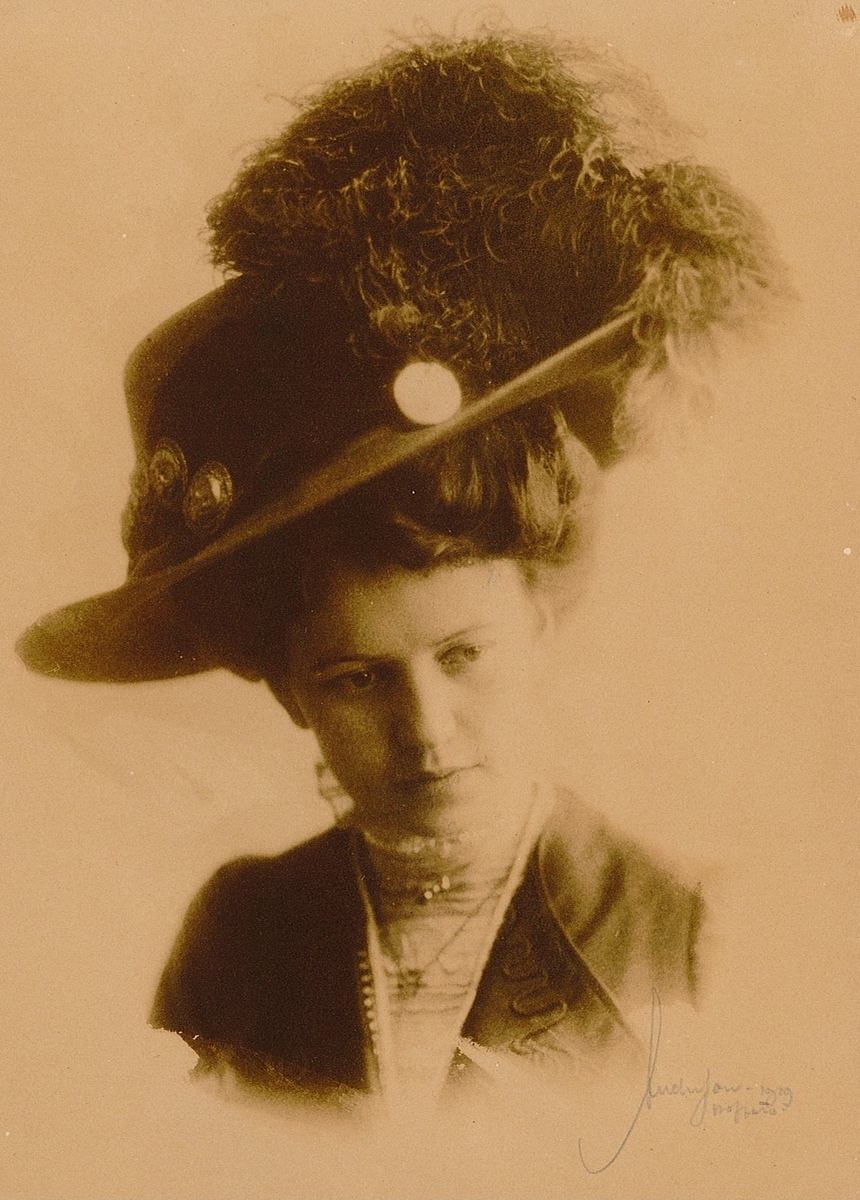
Eidé Norena (1909) performed Lajla's role in 1908

As she enters, the Norwegian gets impressed with her look, and she finds him daring and brave. The stranger names himself at last: Olav Lind, he came from the loveliest place in the Southern Norway, Ringerike near Tyrifjorden lake. Lajla wants to know more about his homeland, and he sings a song praising the great lake. She likes the poem, but Mellet aggressively inquires, what was the reason to leave such a marvellous place. Olav came to North to learn the sort of his uncle Thorolf Lind, who moved to these lands many years ago with wife and a child. He considers the whole family to be dead in misery. Lajla calls the old Jaampa to ask him about the cause, but he knows nothing. Together with Lind he sets out to meet Laagje.

Left alone with Lajla, Mellet tells her about his love. He reminds her that Laagje, Lajla's father, promised the girl to him. She says she was a child and asks him to free her from this pledge: she might love him one day, but for now he is just a friend. Mellet gets depressed and full of jealousy, for he saw her looks towards the daro (the Lapp name for a Norwegian). Lajla leaves angrily suggesting him to mind better his herd. Mellet takes up the idea and decides to protect his tribe from the stranger. He calls his friends, who promptly fill the stage, and tells them about the daro coming to tempt their maidens. In a solemn way they swear on a sacred Rune staff to kill Lind. The plan is to get him at the exit of Laagje's camp.

The whole company marches out, and Lajla appears from behind the rock, where she stayed secretly overhearing Mellet's speech. She is horrified and wishes to save the Norwegian. Soon he comes accompanied by Jaampa. Lajla asks the last to let them talk. She gives Lind a warning about Mellet's plot. The two confess their sympathy towards each other. Lind promises to assemble his faithful friends by the day of winter solstice and come with them to ask Laagje for her hand. Agrees the old man not, Lajla shall leave her tribe anyway. The shine of the aurora will give them a hope and a sign. But for now they need to separate.

=== Act II ===
A snow-covered marketplace with Lapp tents in the background and a church with a porch stretched to the marketplace. Winter noon. It is the last market day of the year, and the place is crowded with Norwegians and Lapps. The girls are flirting with the lads. The Norwegians perform a springdans, the Lapps sing a juoige. (Note: This song (actually a vocal quartet a cappella) was added to the opera by composer some time after its completion. Together with an introduction it is called Juoige Scene and requires an additional female singer, Maggi.) Slightly drunken Jaampa comes out and tells a hunting story about the wolf, whose fell he is wearing. Laagje announces Lajla and Mellet's wedding this evening and invites everybody to the feast. Everybody celebrates the couple and follows Laagje to the tents.

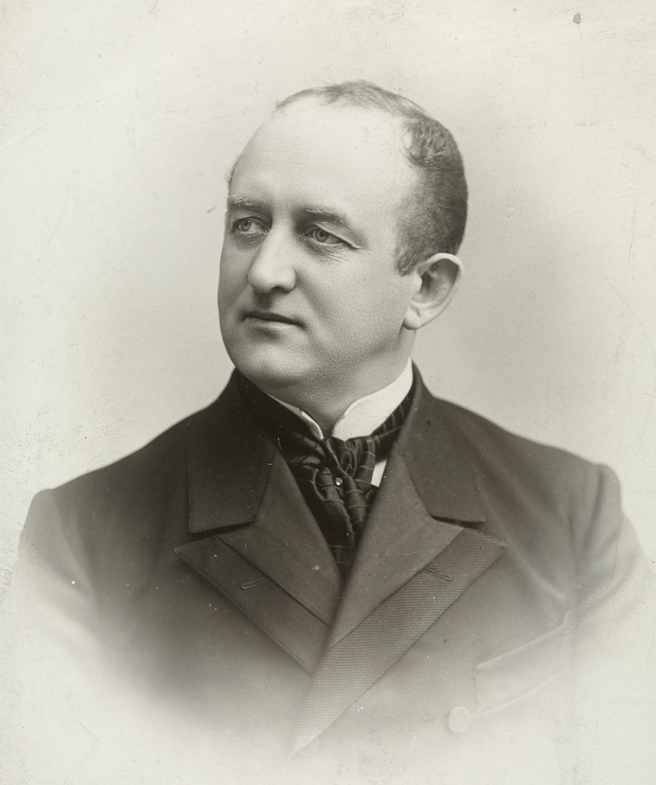
Olav Voss (1901), performer of Laagje's role in 1908

Only the old Jaampa is stopped by Lajla. She confides to him her love with the daro. Jaampa hates that people, but he loves the maiden so much, and she begs so passionately, that he agrees to assist her. He is to find Lind in the nearby valley, where the Norwegian was seen the other day, and take him to the church before the ceremony is finished. In return, Lajla swears to rest faithful to her people even after her marriage to Lind. Jaampa departures.

It gets dark, the stars appear, and the majestic aurora fills the sky. Lajla gets on her knees and praises God asking him to have mercy in her. Mellet comes from one of the tents and says that the priest is here to marry them. Lajla explains again she feels nothing except sisterly love, but Mellet insists that the will of the tribe is to be obeyed. She has to wait the daro no more; if he appears, Mellet will kill him. They leave to different tents.

Lights in the church turn on. Soon enters Lajla in a bridal dress, surrounded by the Lapps decorating her. Both Lapps and Norwegians join the procession. The priest stays in the porch with Laagje and Mellet. The bells and organ are heard, and the crowd salutes the bride. A sudden cry interrupts the scene.

Jaampa steps in, with Lind and his armed men. They demand the priest to stop, as Lajla is Lind's bride. The young man asks Laagje to let him marry the girl. The Lapps and the Norwegians separate from each other and, despite the women's supplications, the men begin to fight. When the priest manages to stop them, Laagje asks for silence as he is ready to tell the truth about the past. The fact is, Lajla is not his daughter, and not a Lapp at all, she is the child of Thorolf Lind, whom Laagje found by the bodies of her parents. They died in a snow storm many years ago. Laagje approves Lajla's marriage to Lind, while Mellet needs to find another girl in his own tribe. Though the news hurts Mellet much, and the Lapps don't want her to leave, Lajla decides to go with Lind to his native Tyrifjorden. They praise the God, and the priest introduces them into the church.

== Recordings ==
Overture

- (rec. 2020) Norwegian opera overtures — Norwegian National Opera and Ballet, Ingar Bergby (cond.) — LAWO Classics LWC1218
