= Ole Henrik Magga =

Norwegian Sámi linguist

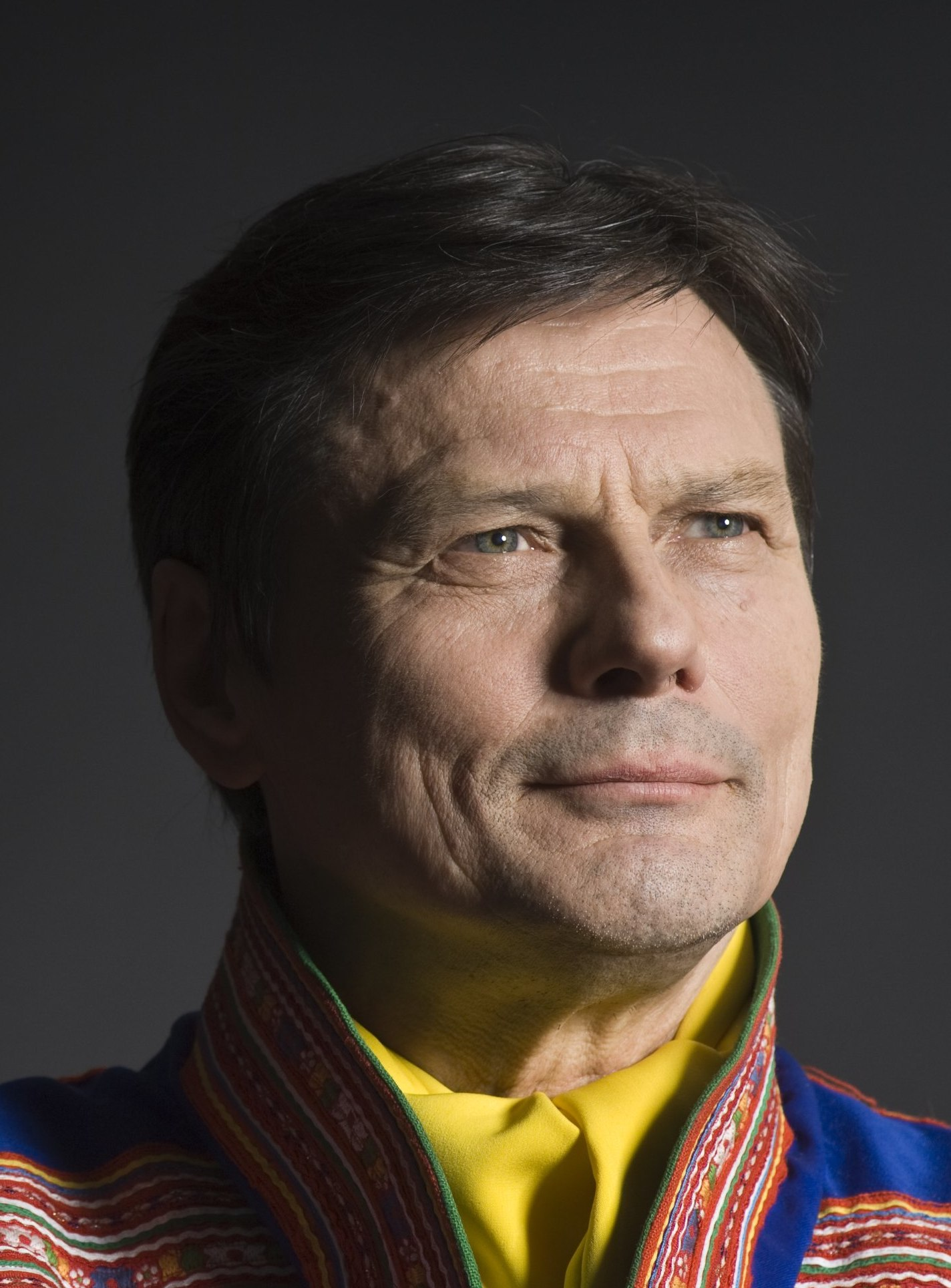
Magga in 2009

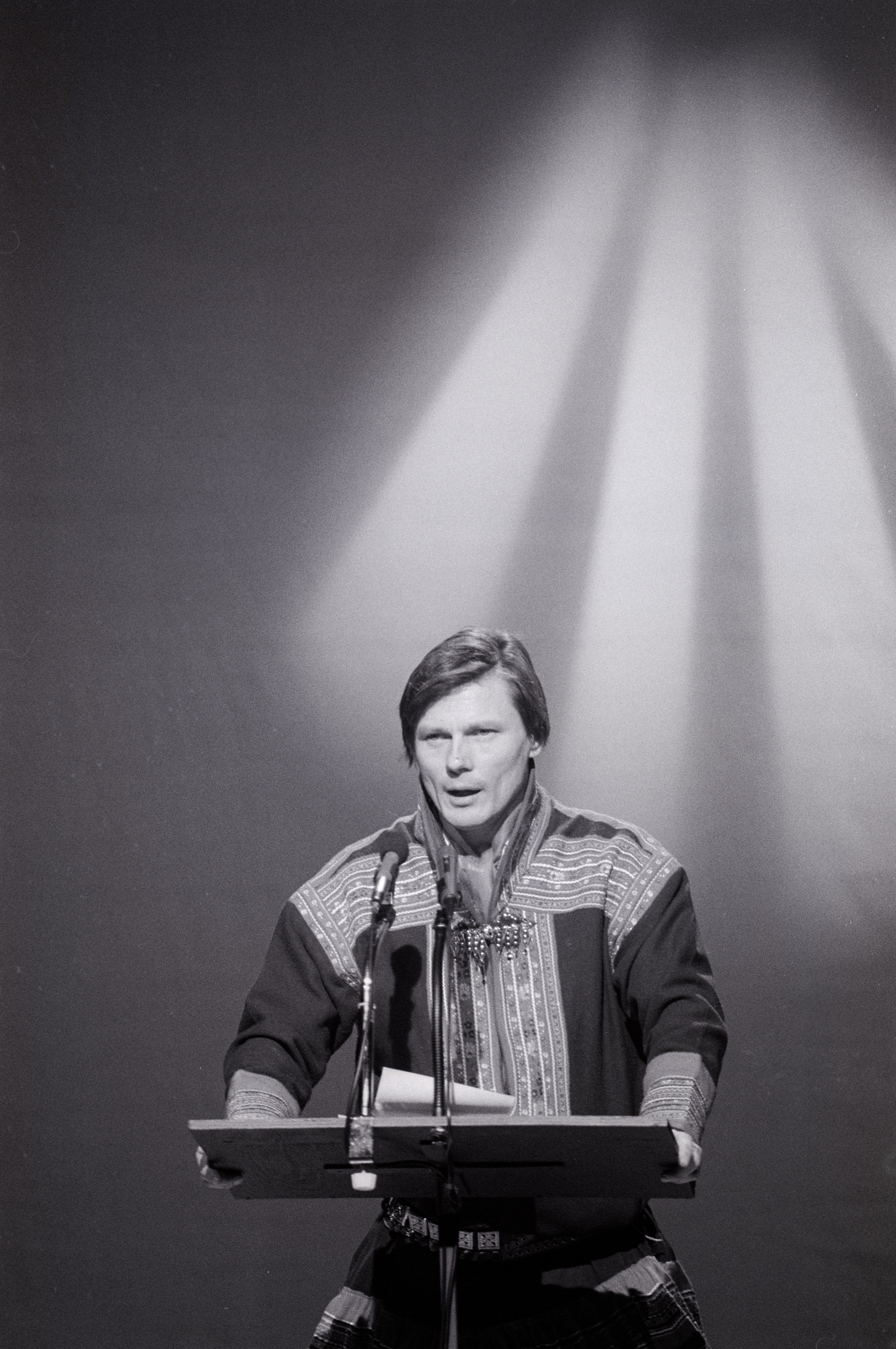
Magga addressing the Sámi Parliament and the Dalai Lama in 1989

Ole Henrik Magga (born 12 August 1947) is a Sámi linguist, professor and politician from Kautokeino Municipality, Norway.

== As a linguist ==
As a linguist, Magga is best known for his work on syntax. His master's thesis at the University of Oslo, "Lokative læt-setninger i samisk" (Locative "to be" sentences in Sámi), discussed the structure of existential and habitive sentences, whose structures in many of the Uralic languages are similar to each other. His doctoral dissertation in 1986 discussed the structure of Sámi verbal phrases, in particular, the interaction between modal verbs and infinitives.

Magga became professor of Finno-Ugric languages at the University of Oslo in 1997, after Knut Bergsland, but relinquished his post to work as professor of Sámi Linguistics at the Sámi University College in Kautokeino. Magga became a member of the Norwegian Academy of Science and Letters in 1993.

In 2006, Magga was made Commander of the Order of St. Olav.

== Political career ==
Magga was a delegate to the World Council of Indigenous Peoples (WCIP) when it was founded in Canada in 1975.

Magga led the Norwegian Sami Association from 1980 to 1985 and was the first president of the Sami Parliament of Norway from 1989 to 1997.

From 1992 to 1995, Magga was a member of the Worlds Commission on Culture and Development.

In 2002, Magga became the first chairman of the UN Permanent Forum on Indigenous Issues.

== Bibliography ==
- Lokative læt-setninger i samisk. Dieđut 1978.
- Modalverb og infinitiv innen verbalet : prosjektrapport. Dieđut 1982.
- Infinitives within the VP in Northern Sami: The accusative with infinitive. in Riepmočála (1984)
- Studier i samisk infinitivsyntaks. Doctoral dissertation, University of Oslo. 1986.

Preceded by -	President of the Sami Parliament; 1989–1997	Succeeded by Sven-Roald Nystø
