= Sara Margrethe Oskal =

Norwegian Sami poet

- Born: 5 July 1970 (age 56); Kautokeino Municipality, Finnmark County
- Education: Oslo National Academy of the Arts
- Writing career
- Language: Sami
- Notable work: Savkkuhan sávrri sániid

Sara Margrethe Oskal (born 1970) is a Norwegian Sami writer, actress, artisan, director and film producer from Kautokeino Municipality in the north of Norway. In 2012, she was nominated for the Nordic Council Literature Prize for her Sami poetry collection Savkkuhan sávrri sániid (Tireless Words).

== Biography ==
Born in 1970 in Kautokeino Municipality, Finnmark County, Sara Margrethe Oskal studied drama at the Helsinki Theatre Academy before gaining a doctorate in performance art at the Oslo National Academy of the Arts in 2009. Her doctoral thesis dealt with the humour in traditional Sami stories and the art of Sami chanting.

Brought up by a family of reindeer herders, Oskal embarked on her literary career in 2006 with her Sami poetry collection Váimmu vuohttume, centred on the reindeer herding community and their local culture. In 2012, she published her second poetry collection Savkkuhan sávrri sániid, translated into Norwegian as Utrettelige ord (Tireless Words) in 2016. Evoking the often difficult encounters between Sami people and the sense of shame they often experience, the collection earned her the Nordic Council Literature prize for works in the Sami language. Her short poems are rich in alliteration, metaphor and striking pictorial language. They have been published in French and Breton in Vaimmu vuhttome / Kavell ma c'halon / Berceau de Mon cæur (2014).

Oskal has written a number of short stories, published in the collection Dál ja dalle (2010) which brings together submissions to a contest launched by the Sami publishing house Davvi Girji in 2009. The winning story, also titled Dál ja dalle, has been published in the English Anthology Whispering Treasures (2012).

In addition to her literary work, Oskal has contributed to theatre and film. In 2015, she produced the short film Aurora Keeps an Eye on You which was featured at the Tromsø International Film Festival in 2015 and at the Māoriland Film Festival in 2016. Her feature film The Tundra Within Me (Eallogierdu) is slated to screen in the Discovery program at the 2023 Toronto International Film Festival.

in a leading role, Oskal features as the character Garen in the NRK drama-comedy series "Heajastallan - The Wedding Party" produced in 2025 and selected for the Toronto International Film Festival 2025, where it had its world premiere in the "Primetime" section. The series premiered on NKR as well as on SVT and DR in 2026. The story plays out in the Sami village of Kautokeino, where Garen is at the bottom of the social ladder, but when her son is to marry the daughter of a wealthy reindeer herding family, Garen is determined to corral her dysfunctional siblings to arrange the perfect wedding (with 3,000 guests). The story unfolds in a modern Sami environment and community, mixing tradition, family relations, guilt, shame and old wounds that have never been healed. The whole of Kautokeino follows as the Golgan family tries to pull off the perfect wedding in record time.
