= Nils Vibe Stockfleth =

Norwegian cleric

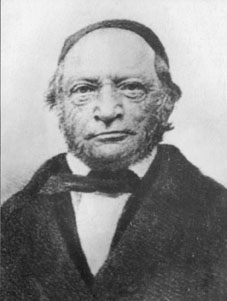
Niels Vibe Stockfleth

Nils Joachim Christian Vibe Stockfleth (11 January 1787 in Fredrikstad, Norway – 26 April 1866 in Sandefjord) was a Norwegian cleric who was instrumental in the first development of the written form of the Northern Sámi language. Stockfleth compiled a Norwegian-Sámi dictionary, wrote about Sámi grammar and translated the New Testament and parts of the Old Testament of the Bible into the Northern Sámi language.

== Education and early career ==
His parents were Dean Niels Stockfleth (1756–1794) and his wife Anne Johanne Vibe (1753–1805). He was a student in Copenhagen from 1803 to 1804, when he was hired as an undersecretary in the Danish Chancellery (Danish: Danske Kancelli). He attended lectures on law, and for a time he studied carpentry.

In 1808 he was commissioned as a lieutenant in the Danish Army; he took part in the Battle of Sehested (Schleswig-Holstein) during the Napoleonic Wars. After the Denmark-Norway union ended in 1814, Stockfleth joined the Norwegian Army as an officer posted to Valdres. He resigned from the army in 1823 to study theology, graduating in 1824. In March of the following year he became pastor at Vadsø Church, transferring to Lebesby Church in 1828 so that he could more easily meet with the nomadic Sámi.

== Linguistics research and field work ==
From 1836 Stockfleth taught Sámi languages and Finnish in Christiania (now the University of Oslo). In 1838 he travelled to Finland and gained the support of Finnish philologists Gustaf Renvall (1781–1841), Reinhold von Becker (1788–1858), Andreas Sjögren (1794–1855) and Elias Lönnrot (1802–1884).

In 1839 he ended his pastoral duties to devote himself fully to understanding Sámi culture, travelling several times to Sámi and Finnish settlements in both Norway and Sweden. Influenced by Enlightenment thinkers like Johann Gottfried Herder, he worked assiduously for what he saw as the betterment of the Sámi people, especially in the literary field. Stockfleth and the Danish polyglot and philologist Rasmus Christian Rask cooperated to develop a means of accurately recording a written form of the Sámi language so that it could be used as a medium for the publication of religious books.

At a time when powerful people, both in government and in the press, believed that the Sámi people should be forced to attend schools with Norwegian being the sole language of instruction and that Sámi-language teaching would delay efforts to modernize and assimilate the Sámi people, Stockfleth succeeded in publishing several Sámi readers and a Sámi grammar.

== Kautokeino 1851–52 ==
In 1851 Stockfleth travelled for the last time to the Finnmark region of Norway. The Lutheran bishop of Oslo immediately encouraged him to go to Kautokeino in the hope that Stockfleth—who knew the Sámi culture, was fluent in Sámi and was respected among the Sámi because of his books—would be able to reconcile a group of Laestadian Sámi schismatics with the official Lutheran state church. He did meet many of the Sámi at one of their religious meetings, but they were in the grip of an experiential ecstasy which was quite foreign to the learned theologian. At one point he lost his temper and began to beat the ecstatic participants with his hands and with a stick, but to no avail. Although he found the uproar of this first meeting frightening, some of the Sámi people did continue to meet with him afterwards, but little came of their talks and Stockfleth travelled away from Finnmark a few months before the Kautokeino rebellion. In 1853 he was awarded a state pension and moved to Sandefjord.

== Selected works ==
- 1840: Grammatik i det lappiske Sprog, saaledes som det tales i norsk-Finmarken. (Grammar of Sámi, Norwegian Finnmark dialect). Christiania: Grøndahl.
- 1840: Det nye testamentet (New Testament in Sámi)
- 1848: Bidrag til kundskab om finnerne i kongeriget Norge
- 1848: Bidrag til kundskab om qvænerne i kongeriget Norge
- 1852: Norsk-lappisk ordbog (Norwegian-Sámi dictionary)
- 1860: Dagbog over mine missionsreiser i Finmarken("Journal of my mission trips to Finnmark")
- 1896: Johannes Nilson Skaar, Posthumous publication of Nils Vibe Stockfleth's Autobiography (to 1825) and Letters (1825–1854).
