= Liv Inger Somby =

Sámi journalist and educator

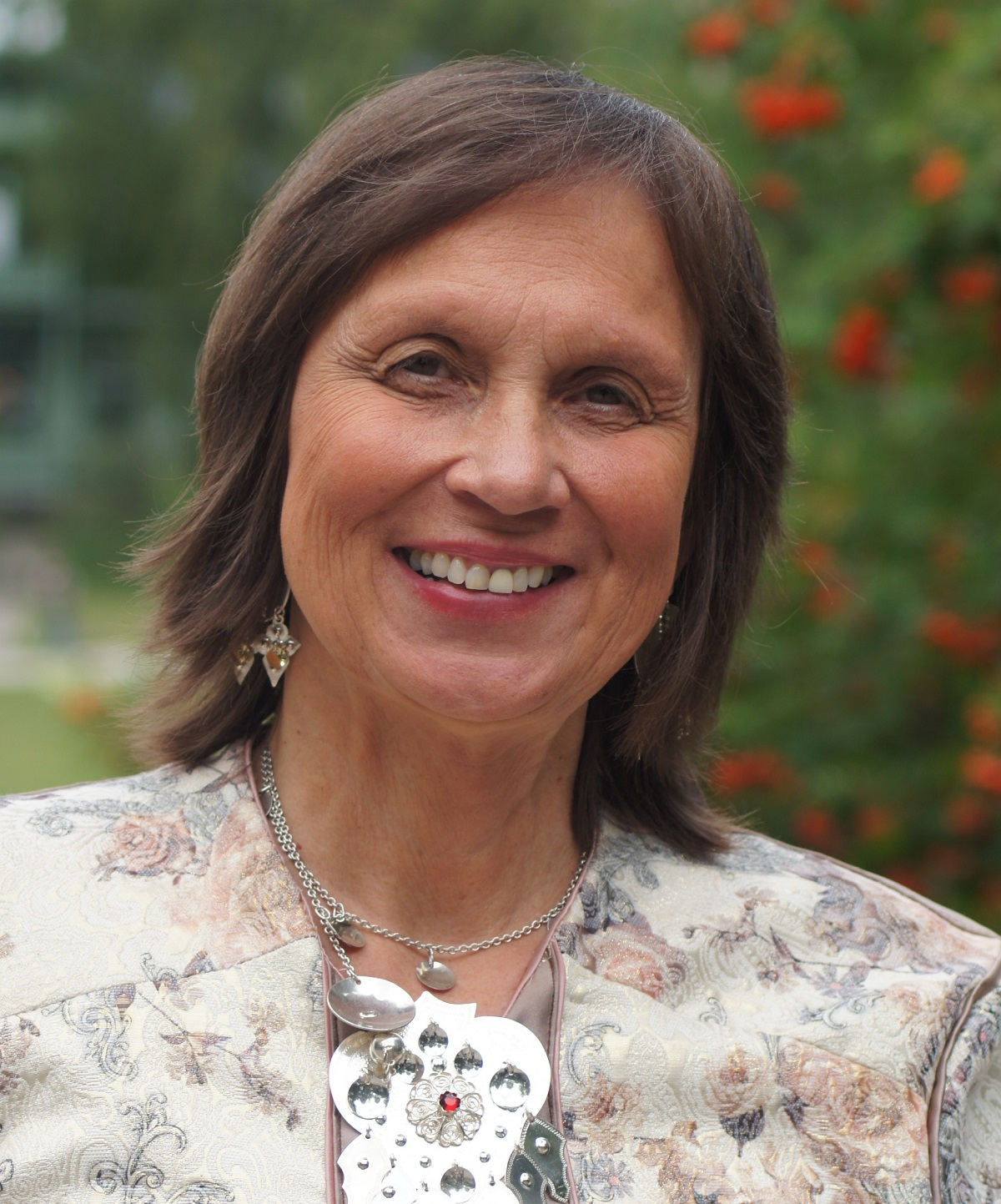
- Liv Inger Somby at Wikimania 2019
- Born: 25 March 1962; Karigasniemi
- Education: Sámi University of Applied Sciences, Finnmark University College, Norwegian Journalist College, The Arctic University of Norway
- Occupations: Author, university teacher, journalist
- Employers: GÁLDU Resource Centre for the Rights of Indigenous Peoples (2010–2011); NRK Sápmi (–2017); NRK (1988–); Sveriges Television; Sámi University of Applied Sciences (2017–); Sámi University of Applied Sciences (2023–2027)

Liv Inger Somby (born 1962) is a Norwegian Sámi educator, writer, and journalist. She specializes in indigenous journalism which she teaches at the Sámi University of Applied Sciences in Kautokeino Municipality in the north of Norway.

Born in the village of Guohppenjavvi, Karigasniemi, Utsjoki on the Finnish side of the Sápmi border, she now lives in Kautokeino Municipality, Norway. She is one of only three people who have earned a master's degree in indigenous journalism in Norway. She has since worked in Norway, Sweden and Finland, both as a freelance and for the Swedish and Norwegian national broadcasting corporations.

As a journalist Somby has reported on Sámi news and features for over 30 years. A member of Norway's Truth and Reconciliation Commission, she has also worked in Sweden, Finland and Russia. She heads the Sámi Broadcasting Council (or Sámi Programme Council) at NRK Sápmi.

In the mid-1990s Somby undertook a study of 27 Sami women who reported on their earlier experiences and their impressions of what life for the Sami peoples had been like a hundred years ago. Many of them had been persuaded to marry against their will while some told of how children had frozen to death on the way to school. As many of the stories were dramatic or violent, they remained as tape recordings for over 20 years. Only in 2017 did she decide to publish 12 of them.
