= Nicolai Friis =

Norwegian politician

Nicolai Friis (1815–1888) was a Norwegian politician.

Growing up in a family of thirteen, he was the son of priest Søren Hjelm Friis and brother of professor Jens Andreas Friis and geologist Jacob Pavels Friis.

Nicolai Friis was chaplain in Førde Municipality in 1840, and served as mayor of the municipality for a period of ten years. In 1853 he founded the local library with a fund grant from the state. He served as a deputy representative to the Norwegian Parliament in 1854, and later during the term 1862–1863, representing Buskerud whereto he had moved. Died in Eidsvoll Municipality in 1888.
