= Sápmelaš =

Sápmelaš, originally Sabmelaš, was a magazine written in Northern Sámi that was published in Finland from 1932 to 2001.

== History and profile ==
Sápmelaš was launched in 1932 by Sámi Čuvgehussearvi. The magazine was started as a four-page publication and was distributed to all Sámi households for free. It was financed by the Finnish government until 1995, after which the Sámi Parliament in Finland financed it for 6 years. 2001 saw the magazine fold due to a lack of financing.

The first editors were Paavo Ravila (1934–1943) and Erkki Itkonen (1934–1950). Although neither Ravila nor Itkonen were Sámi, they were both professors of Finno-Ugric languages at the University of Helsinki in Finland. Jouni Kitti served as editor from 1980 to 1998.
