= Pigga Keskitalo =

Sámi member of the Sámi Parliament of Finland and education researcher

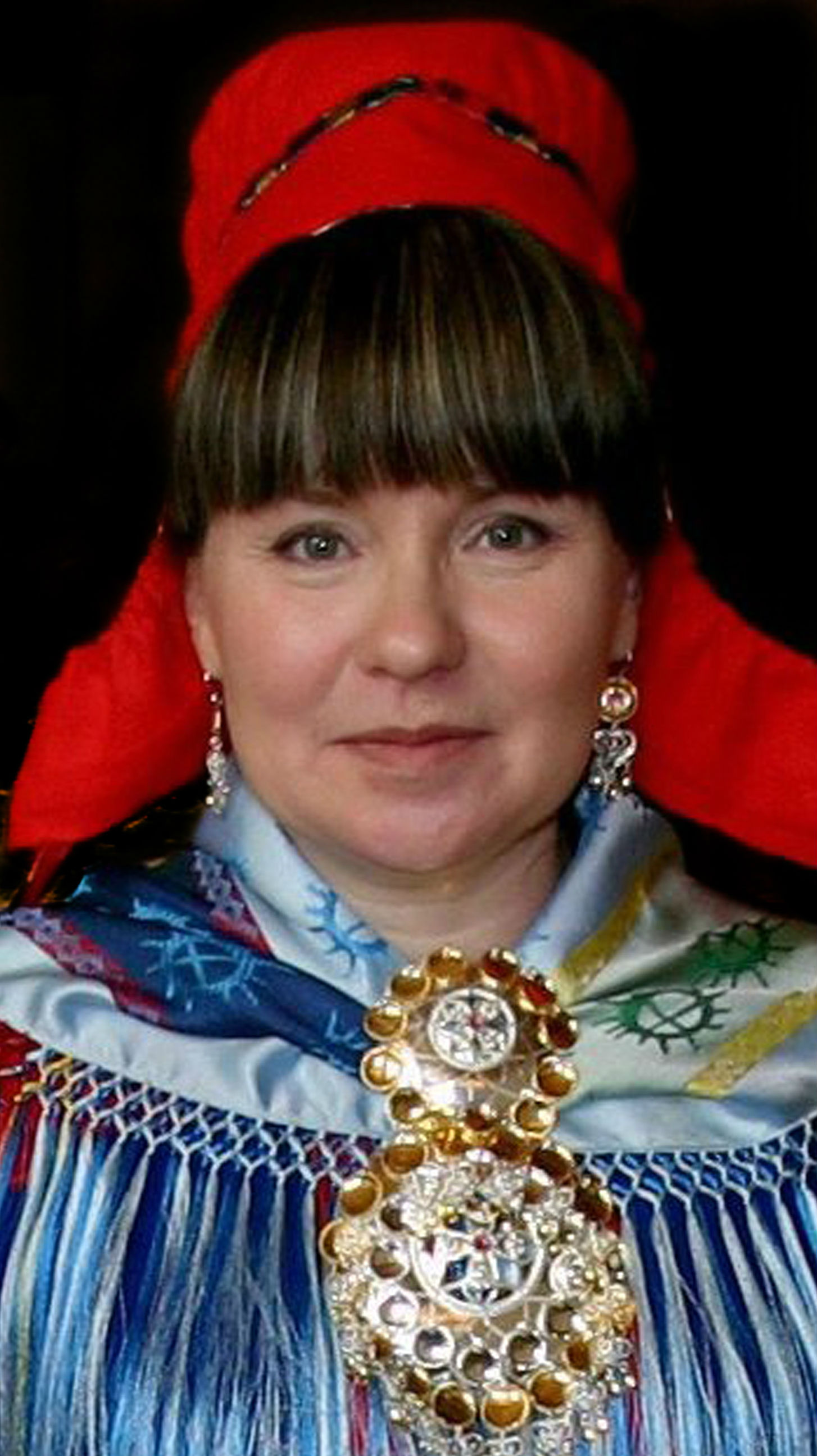
- Born: 18 August 1972 (age 54); Utsjoki
- Citizenship: Finland
- Occupations: Politician; Academic
- Known for: Member of Sámi Parliament

Academic background
- Education: University of Lapland
- Thesis: Saamelaisen koulun kulttuurisensitiivisyyttä etsimässä kasvatusantropologian keinoin (2010)

Academic work
- Discipline: Education
- Website: https://www.piggakeskitalo.me/

Pigga Päivi Kristiina Keskitalo (born 1972, Utsjoki) is a member of the Sámi Parliament of Finland and education researcher at the University of Helsinki, University of Lapland, and the Sámi University.

== Biography ==
Keskitalo was born in Utsjoki in 1972. She earned her first degree in education in 1997 from the University of Lapland and worked as a teacher. She graduated with a MA in 2008, from the same university. She undertook doctoral research at the University of Lapland and graduated in 2010 with a PhD which explored Sámi cultural sensitivity through educational anthropology.

=== Research ===
Keskitalo researches Sámi education in contemporary and historical settings and has published widely on the subject, including on the history of Sámi education in Norway. Another aspect of her research is how cultural backgrounds influence perceptions of nature in the education system. She is a proponent of the right for Sámi children to be able to learn their languages.

In 2014, she began work at the University of Helsinki. She is project lead at the Institute of Migration, exploring multicultural childhoods in Lapland.

=== Politics ===
Keskitalo was elected a member of the Sámi Parliament in 2016. She is a deputy member of the Enontekiö Vitality Committee. Keskitalo was re-elected from 2020 until 2023.
