= Waren Sardne =

Norwegian Sámi newspaper

- Underrentning fra Fjeldet — Samisk Blad [Message from the Mountains — The Sámi Journal]
- Editor: Daniel Mortenson (1910–1924); Lars Danielsen (1924–1927)
- Launched: 15 January 1910
- Ceased publication: 1913
- Relaunched: 1922 to 1927
- Language: Norwegian
- Headquarters: Plassje, Norway

Waren Sardne was a Norwegian Sámi newspaper published from 1910 to 1913 and then revived from 1922 to 1927. It was, together with Saǥai Muittalægje, an important outlet for Sámi news and opinion in the early 20th century.

== History ==
Waren Sardne (Message from the Mountain) was founded in Plassje, Norway, as a weekly newspaper by Sámi activist and reindeer herder Daniel Mortenson on 15 January 1910. The paper folded in 1913, but Mortenson revived it as a monthly in 1922. When Mortenson died in 1924, his son, Lars Danielsen, took over as editor.

Although the title was in Southern Sámi, Waren Sardne published articles primarily in Norwegian. Originally, Waren Sardne published with the subtitle "Lappernes Organ" (The Lapps' Voice), but at 1911 Sámi conference in Steinkjer, Norway, attendees voted to change the subtitle to "Samernes Organ" (The Sámi's Voice), which later changed to "Samisk Blad" (The Sámi Journal).

The paper covered a range of topics, such as reindeer herding and Sámi history, along with general news and articles about cultural and ethnic discrimination. A recurring topic was the need for Sámi people build political awareness and to organize and advocate for their interests and identity.

== Editors-in-chief ==
- Daniel Mortenson (1910–1913; 1922–1924)
- Lars Danielsen (1924–1927)
