= Bienias =

Bienias is a surname. Notable people with the surname include:

- Andrea Bienias (born 1959), German high jumper
- Bryan Bienias, bassist for American rock band Cougars
- Julia Bienias, American biostatistician

== See also ==
- Bientie
