= Anders Larsen =

Sámi teacher, journalist and writer

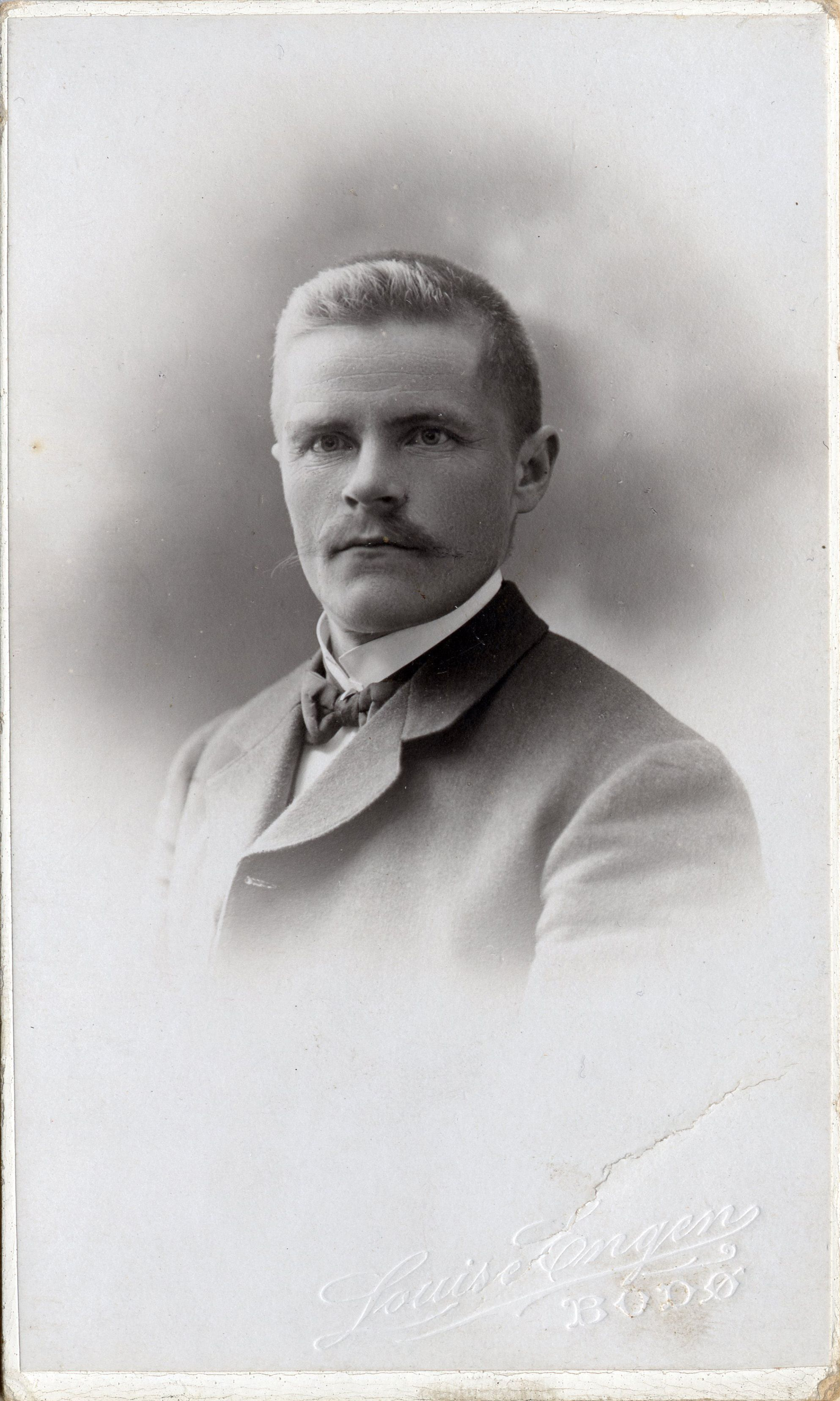
Anders Larsen in 1910

Anders Larsen (December 2, 1870 – December 10, 1949) was a Sami teacher, journalist, and writer.

Larsen was born in Seglvik in Kvænangen Municipality in Troms county, Norway. His parents were Sea Sami. After working as a primary school teacher in the village of Kokelv from 1895 to 1897, he attended the Tromsø normal school from 1897 to 1899. He then worked in Rafsbotn from 1899 to 1902. He then worked in Repparfjorden, Neverfjorden, and Kokelv from 1902 to 1918. He taught in the Sami village of Sandstrand from 1918 to 1920 (at that time, it was part of Trondenes Municipality). From 1920 to 1940, he worked at the Sørvikmark school (now in Harstad Municipality).

Larsen served as the editor of the Sami newspaper Saǥai Muittalægje (The News Reporter) from 1904 to 1911. The newspaper was published twice a month. In 1912, he self-published the first Sami novel, Bæivve-Alggo (Dawn). The novel contains depictions of Sea Sami life, following the protagonist Ábo Eira through various stages of life. The novel depicts the consequences of the Norwegianization policy for the Sami language and self-image. The novel counteracts the Sami sense of inferiority towards the Norwegians, and it is also a protest against Norwegian society's contempt for the Sami.

In the fall of 1949, the same year that he died, Larsen sent a manuscript about Sea Sami life and living conditions to the philologist Just Knud Qvigstad. Qvigstad translated it into Norwegian and published it as Om sjøsamene (The Sea Sami) in 1950. The text was first published in Sami in 1979 as Mearrasámiid birra in Larsen's Kvænangen dialect in the Tromsø Museum series Acta Borealia.

There is a myth that Larsen "fled" from Finnmark county in 1918. In fact, he simply moved to the district where his wife was born (to Melvik near Sørvik). Here he continued his efforts for "the same right as other people to life's table" (samme rett som andre folk til livets bord), as he phrased it.

Larsen died in Sørvikmark in Sandtorg Municipality (now part of Harstad Municipality).
