= Davvi Girji =

Saami publishing company in Norway

Davvi Girji (Northern book) is a Sámi publishing house and media company located in Karasjok, Norway. It is the largest Sámi publishing house, specializing in fiction and text books. In addition, it publishes large Northern Sámi-Norwegian dictionaries

The publisher has over 300 releases since 1979, with a broad language variety such as: Northern Sámi, Southern Sámi, Kildin Sámi, Lule Sámi, Norwegian, Swedish, German, Finnish and English.

Davvi Girji also stands behind the subtitles of the Sámi news Ođđasat in NRK. Davvi Girji has also engaged in the work of Sámi computer solutions.

This article is wholly or partly based on material from the Norwegian-language Wikipedia

== Authors ==
They include:

- Hans Gabrielsen
- Sara Margrethe Oskal
- Pekka Sammallahti

== See also ==
- Min Áigi
- Sámi media
