= Labbas =

Lake in Arjeplog Municipality, Sweden

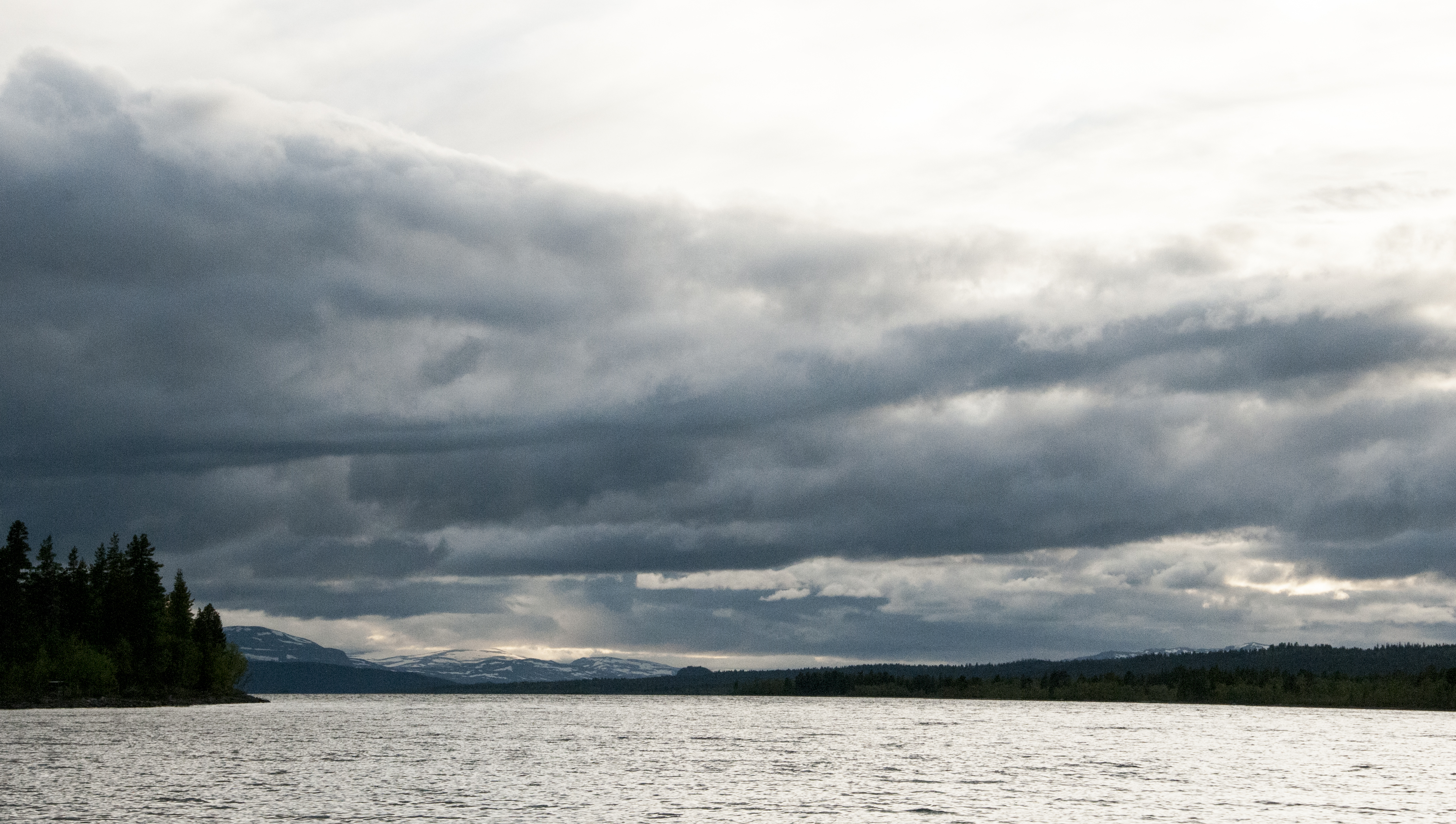
- Lábbas lake with Tjidtják mountain behind

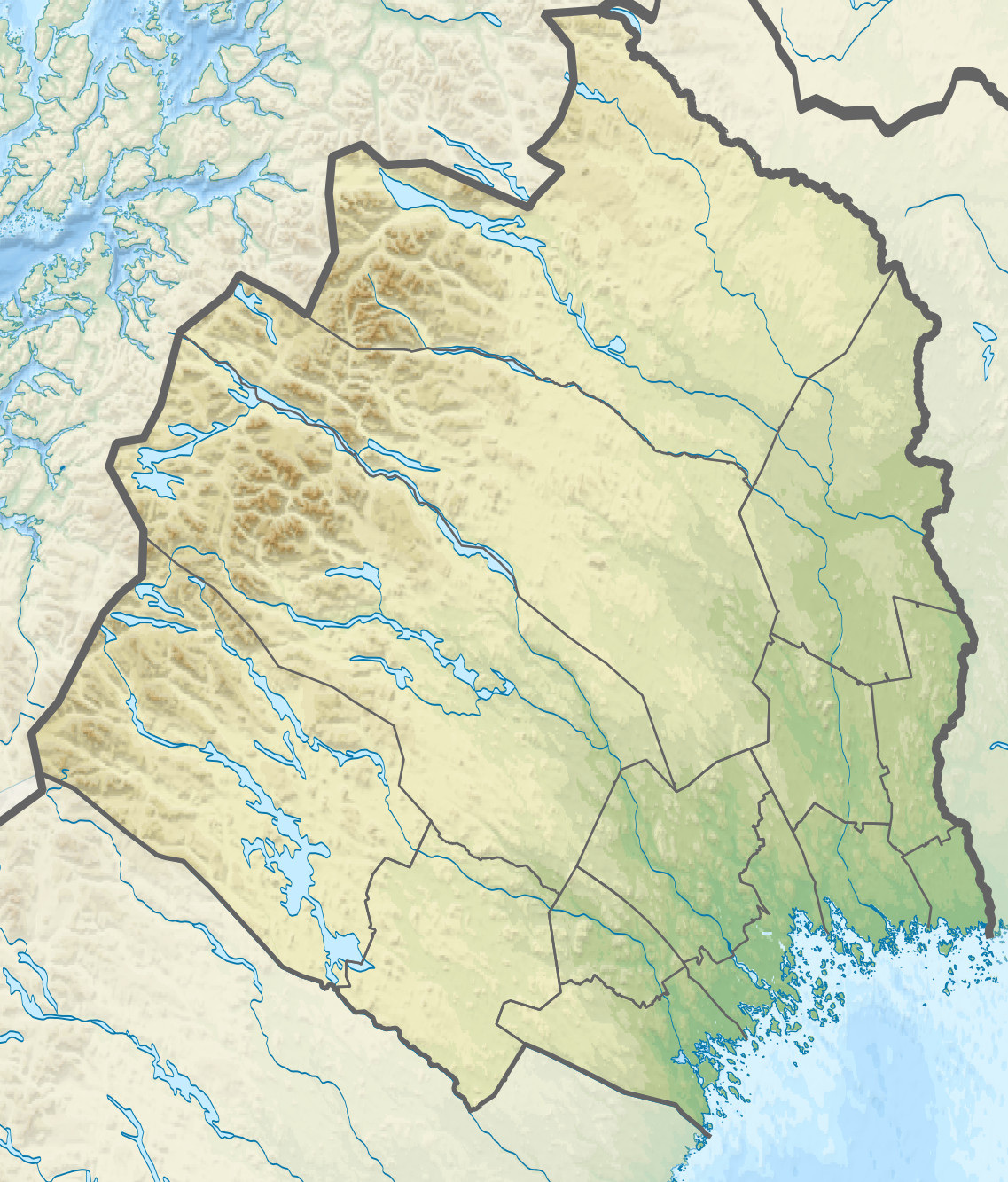
- Location within Norrbotten Location within Sweden
- Location: Arjeplog Municipality
- Coordinates: 66°24′N 17°36′E
- Basin countries: Sweden
- Surface elevation: 488 m (1,601 ft)

Labbas is a lake in the Swedish municipality of Arjeplog near the village of Sundnäs close to the Arctic Circle. The lake stands at 488 meters above sea level. Locally, the lake is known for being a good fishing ground for char.

Astrid Lindgren used the name of the lake as a name in Ronia the Robber's Daughter after she found it on a road map.
