= Jens Andreas Friis =

Norwegian linguist (1821–1896)

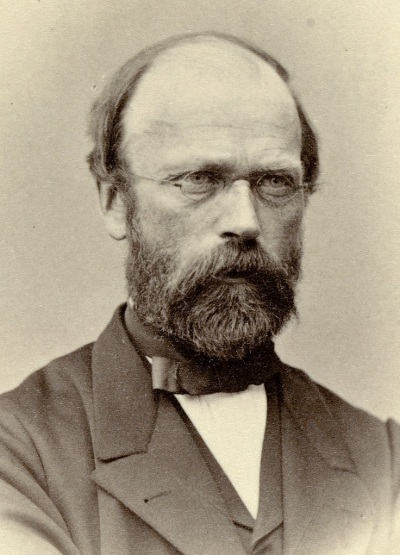
Friis (1888)

Jens Andreas Friis (2 May 1821 – 16 February 1896) was a Norwegian philologist, lexicographer and author. He was a university professor and a prominent linguist of the languages spoken by the Sami people. He is widely recognized as the founder of the study of Sami languages. Today he is also commonly associated with his novel Lajla: A New Tale of Finmark, which was adapted into the opera Lajla, and the 1929 silent film Laila.

== Background ==
Friis was born in Sogndal in Nordre Bergenhus, Norway. He was the son of church vicar Soren Hjelm Friis (1781–1856) and Charlotte Lovise Cammermeyer (1789–1869). He was the brother of priest and politician Nicolai Friis.

== Career ==
Friis was appointed reader in Sami languages at the University of Kristiania (now University of Oslo) in 1863. Three years later he was awarded a chair in the Lapp and Kven languages, with a special duty in translation. He published on the Sami language and mythology as well as travel literature about northern Norway. Friis established the Northern Sami orthography, which, although modified through three spelling reforms, is still in common usage. Until Konrad Nielsen's dictionary Lappisk ordbok was published in three volumes between 1932 and 1938, Friis' Sami dictionary was the most important of its kind. Friis also translated With Nansen over Greenland in 1888: My journey from Lapland to Greenland by Samuel Balto from the original Sami into the Norwegian language.

== Friis' ethnographic maps ==
Friis published three series of thematic maps covering Norway north of the Ofotfjord. The first edition was published in 1861, and the second in 1888/1890. Each household was coded with a three-way symbol denoting 1) ethnic group 2) household member's fluency in Norwegian, Sami, and Kven, and 3) whether the family lived in a goahti. These maps, in addition to the censuses of 1865, 1875, 1891, and 1900, provide a valuable resource of knowledge of the ethnicity and language in the circumpolar region decades before the enforcement of Norwegian as the single official language in schools.

== Selected works ==
- Lappisk Grammatik, 1856
- Lappiske Sprogprøver. En Samling af Lappiske Eventyr, Ordsprog og Gaader med Ordbog, 1856
- Lappisk Mythologi, Eventyr og Folkesagn, 1871
- En Sommer i Finmarken, Russisk Lapland og Nordkarelen. Skildringer af Land og Folk, 1871
- Hans Majestæt Kong Oscar II's Reise i Nordland og Finmarken Aar 1873, 1874
- Tilfjelds i Ferierne eller Jæger- og Fiskerliv i Høifjeldene, 1876
- Fra Finmarken. Skildringer, 1881
- Klosteret i Petschenga. Skildringer fra Russisk Lapland, 1884
- Ordbog over det Lappiske Sprog, 1887
- Skildringer fra Finmarken, 1891

== Other sources ==
- Lindkjølen, Hans (1983) J. A. Friis og samene (Hønefoss: Tyri forlag) ISBN 82-7122-000-4
- Hansen, Lars Ivar (1998) Friis' etnografiske kart i Ottar Tidsskrift fra (Tromsø Museum)
