= Acta Borealia =

- Discipline: Linguistics, history, archaeology, folklore studies, ethnology, social anthropology, human geography
- Language: English

Publication details
- History: 1984–present
- Publisher: Routledge (Norway)

Standard abbreviations
- ISO 4: Acta Boreal.

Indexing
- ISSN: 0800-3831

Links
- Journal homepage

Acta Borealia is an interdisciplinary research journal dedicated to cultural studies. It was established in 1984. It is published in English by Routledge and is based at the Tromsø University Museum and University of Tromsø.

The journal publishes research findings on society in the Arctic area. The journal focuses in particular on ethnicity; settlement patterns and settlement development; economics; and political, cultural, and social phenomena from prehistory to the recent past.

The journal is edited by Bryan Hood (Tromsø), Liv Helene Willumsen (Tromsø), Roger Jørgensen (Tromsø), and Rane Willerslev (Aarhus). The editorial board has members from Denmark, Finland, Greenland, Iceland, Norway, Russia, Sweden, and the United States.

According to SCImago Journal Rank (SJR), the journal h-index is 16.
