= Sámi Čuvgehussearvi =

Sami cultural association

Sámi Čuvgehussearvi (orig. Northern Sami: Sami Čuvgitusseärvi, Finnish: Lapin sivistysseura and Inari Sami: Säämi Čuovvittâsservi) (literally The Society for the Promotion of Sámi Culture) was an association that had as its goal the promotion of Sámi culture in Finland that was founded on 11 December 1932 at the Institute for Anatomy at the University of Helsinki by Väinö Lassila, J. Keränen, Paavo Ravila and P. Mustakallio. One of the major accomplishments that the society is remembered for in Finland was assisting in the evacuation of the Skolts from Pechenga. In addition, it irregularly published a series of grammars, dictionaries and books on the Sámi culture and people. In the beginning, this series was called Sami čuvgitusseärvi toaimatusak, although it was later changed to Sámi Čuvgehussearvi doaimmahusat to reflect its new spelling once the common orthography had been introduced.

In 1934, Sámi Čuvgehussearvi started to publish Sápmelaš. Furthermore, a separate orthography for Northern Sámi as it was spoken in Finland was created by the society to be used in the newspaper. This orthography is the one that is commonly referred to as the Paavo Ravila or Sámi Čuvgehussearvi orthography.

Sámi Čuvgehussearvi worked with other Sámi organisations, societies and associations to organize a pan-Nordic Sámi conference, which was finally held for the first time in Jokkmokk in 1953.

At its annual meeting in Helsinki on 24 April 2007, a decision to disband the society was passed.

== Publications ==
The following is an abbreviated list of the association's publications:

- Itkonen, Tuomo (1934). Samikiel abis. Sámi Čuvgehussearvi doaimmahusat 1 (in Northern Sámi): Sami Čuvgitusseärvi, 199 pp.
- Nickul, Karl (1935). Eräs Petsamokysymys : Suonikylän alueesta kolttakulttuurin suojelualue. Sámi Čuvgehussearvi doaimmahusat 2 (in Finnish). WSOY: Helsinki, 32 pp.
- Itkonen, Tuomo and Karl Nickul (ed.) 1936) . Suenjel : kuvia kolttalappalaisten maasta. Sámi Čuvgehussearvi doaimmahusat 3 (in Finnish, Swedish and English). Lapin sivistysseura, Suomen kansallismuseo and Gummerus: Jyväskylä, 96 pp.
- Ryle, John Charles (1937). Oađáh-uv tun?. (orig. Are you Asleep?) Translated by Lauri Itkonen. Sámi Čuvgehussearvi doaimmahusat 4 (in Inari Sámi). Helsinki: Säämi Čuovvittasseervi, 11 pp.
- (1937). Katsaus Lapin sivistysseuran 5-vuotiseen toimintaan 1932-1937. Sámi Čuvgehussearvi doaimmahusat 5 (in Finnish). Sana: Helsinki, 11 pp.
- Guttorm, Aslak (1940). Koccam spalli : tivtak ja maidnasak. Sámi Čuvgehussearvi doaimmahusat 6 (in Northern Sámi): Sami Čuvgitusseärvi: Helsinki 60 pp.
- (1941). Nuottasalbmakirji. Sámi Čuvgehussearvi doaimmahusat 7 (a hymnal in Northern Sámi): Sami Čuvgitusseärvi, 199 pp.
- Mikkola, Jooseppi Julius (1941). Kolttakylän arkisto. Sámi Čuvgehussearvi doaimmahusat 8 (in Finnish): WSOY: Porvoo, 128 pp.
- Itkonen, Toivo (1941). Lappalaisten leikit ja ajanvietot. Sámi Čuvgehussearvi doaimmahusat 9 (in Finnish). Sami Čuvgitusseärvi: Helsinki, 60 pp.
- Itkonen, Toivo (1942). Lappalaisten vanhat henkilönnimet. Sámi Čuvgehussearvi doaimmahusat 10 (in Finnish): Sami Čuvgitusseärvi: Helsinki, 36 pp.
