= Gustav Lund =

Norwegian Sami preacher (1862–1912)

Gustav Fridtjof Lund
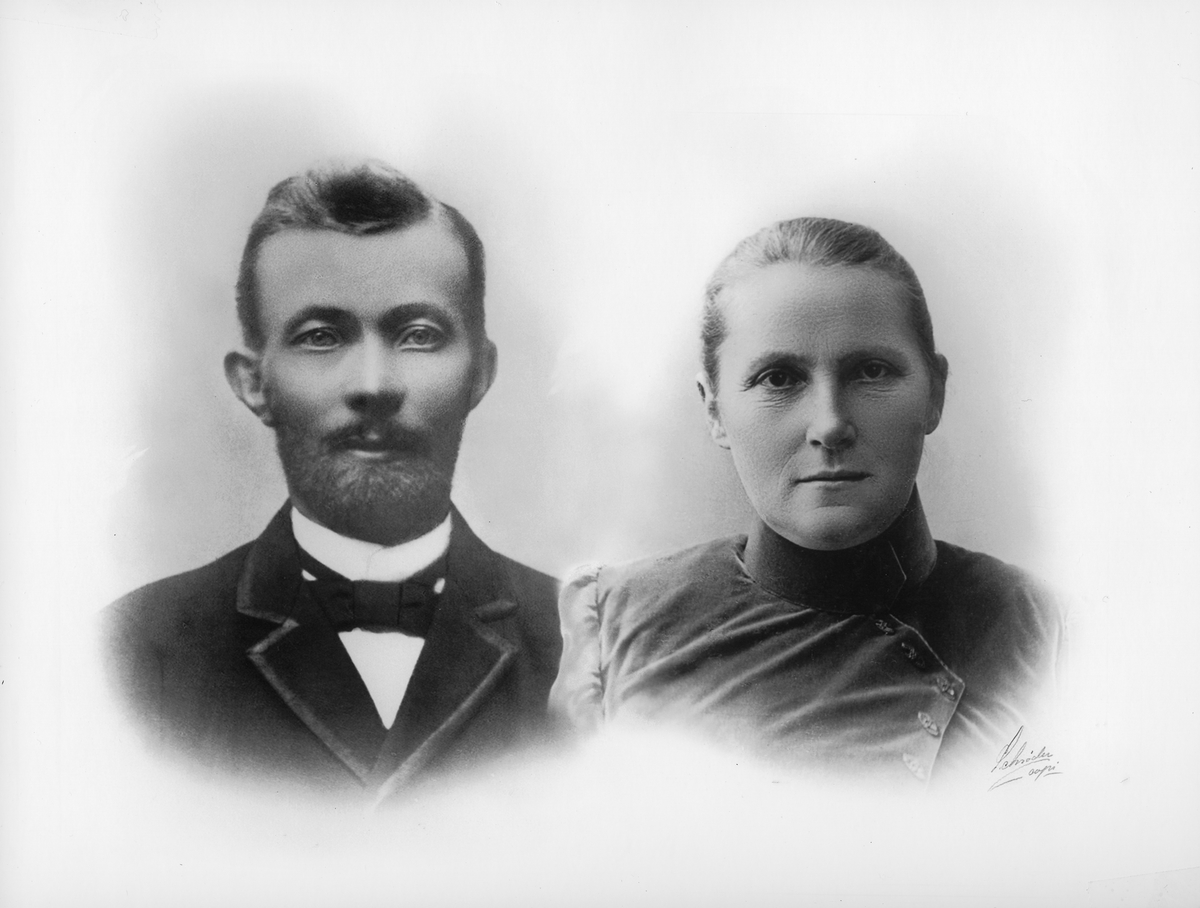
- Gustav and his wife, Hansine Lund
- Born: 18 April 1862; Talvik, Alta, Norway
- Died: 26 February 1912 (aged 49); Sigerfjord, Sortland, Norway
- Occupations: Sled Preacher, Journalist
- Known for: Editor of Nuorttanaste newspaper

Gustav Fridtjof Lund (18 April 1862 – 26 February 1912) was a Norwegian Sámi travelling preacher, known as the "sled preacher". In 1898, he became the first editor-in-chief of the Nuorttanaste Christian newspaper, which is currently the longest-running Northern Sámi-language publication in the world.

== Early life ==
Lund was born in the village of Talvik in Alten-Talvig Municipality in Finnmark county, Norway, to a Kven-speaking family. His parents died when he was young and he was raised by his grandparents until he was sent at age seven to live with a foster family in the village of Korsfjord where Northern Sámi was spoken. He attended a folk high school in Alta with the hope of eventually becoming a teacher, but he lacked the money for further education. He apprenticed as a carpenter in Vardø before moving to Bodø to take up fishing. Lund met Hansine Pettersen from Gildeskål Municipality there and they married in 1888.

== Sled preacher ==
After the birth of his son, Ferdinand, in 1889, Lund became more active in the Evangelical Lutheran Free Church of Norway, working with the Bodø preacher Ole A. Schulstad to translate hymns and other material into Northern Sámi. In 1892, the Free Church established a group to evangelize among the Sámi, and Lund was made a travelling preacher due, in part, to his knowledge of both Northern Sámi and Kven. He was called the "sled preacher" (gielkábáhppan in Northern Sámi) because he used a toboggan to carry devotional books and treaties on his travels.

Lund felt that written material was an important way to connect with people across Sápmi so he founded the newspaper Nuorttanaste, originally using a hand press to print issues. In 1902, he acquired a larger printing press and installed it in his home in Sigerfjord, where it remained in use until his death in 1912.
