= Kautokeino =

Kautokeino (Northern Sami: Guovdageaidnu) may refer to:

== Places ==
- Kautokeino Municipality (also known as: Guovdageaidnu), a municipality in Finnmark county, Norway
- Kautokeino (village) (also known as: Guovdageaidnu), the main village in Kautokeino Municipality in Finnmark county, Norway
- Kautokeino river, also known as Altaelva, a river in Finnmark county, Norway
- Kautokeino Airfield, the airport in Kautokeino Municipality in Finnmark county, Norway
- Kautokeino Church, a church in Kautokeino Municipality in Finnmark county, Norway

== Other ==
- Kautokeino rebellion, a revolt in the village of Kautokeino in northern Norway in 1852
- The Kautokeino Rebellion, a 2008 film based on the true story of the Kautokeino rebellion in 1852
- Kautokeino IL, a sports club in Finnmark county, Norway
