= Asbjørn Nesheim =

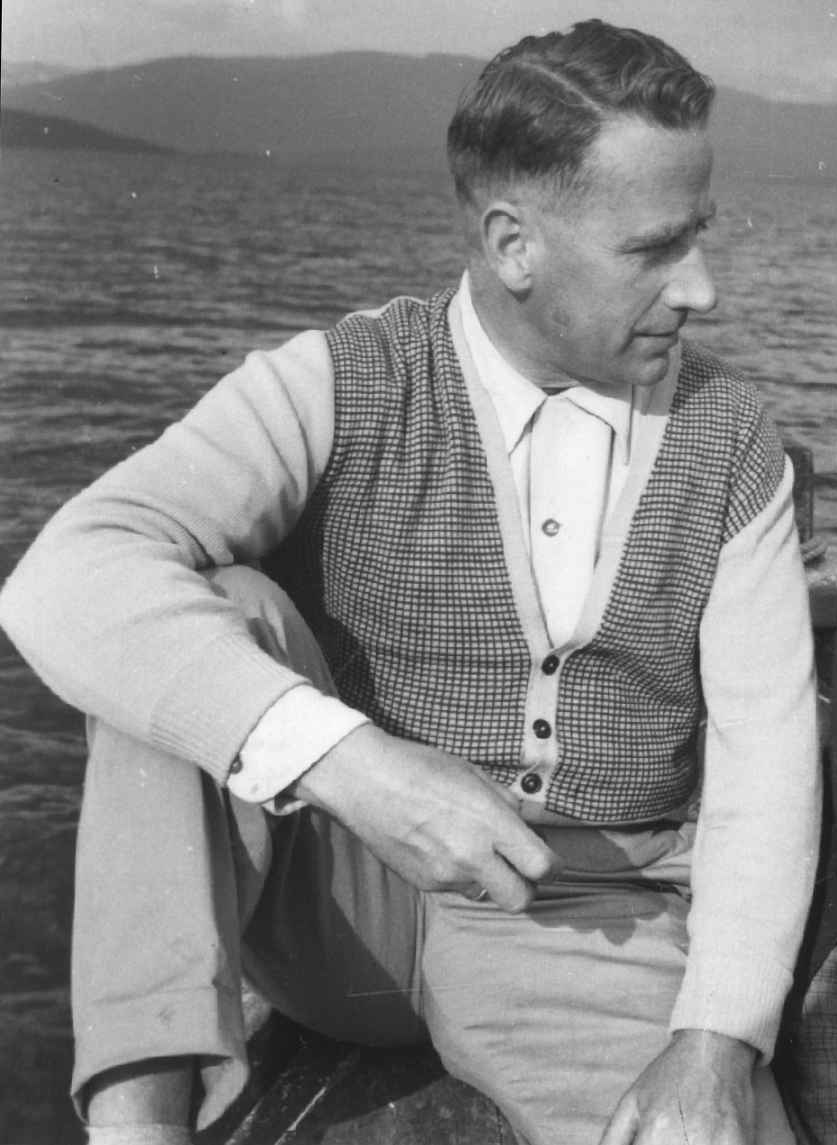

Asbjørn Nesheim (14 December 1906 in Trondheim –19 January 1989 in Oslo) was a Norwegian linguist and curator known for his research on the Sámi languages and cultural history, particularly for his collaboration with Konrad Nielsen on volumes four and five of Nielsen's Lapp Dictionary. Nesheim was also responsible for creating and building up a Sámi Department at the Norsk Folkemuseum in Oslo from the 1950s on.

== Bibliography ==
- Nesheim, Asbjørn 1942: Der lappische Dualis : mit Berücksichtigung finnisch-ugrischer und indo-europäischer Verhältnisse. Skrifter / utgitt av Det norske videnskaps-akademi i Oslo. II, Hist.-filos. klasse; 1941, no. 5. Oslo : I kommisjon hos Dybwad, 1942.
- Nielsen, Konrad og Asbjørn Nesheim 1932-1962: Lappisk ordbok : grunnet på dialektene i Polmak, Karasjok og Kautokeino / av Konrad Nielsen = Lapp dictionary : based on the dialects of Polmak, Karasjok and Kautokeino. Instituttet for Sammenlignende Kulturforskning, serie B; 17. Oslo : Aschehoug, 1932-1962. Medforfatter for b. 4-5: Asbjørn Nesheim.
