= Daerpies Dierie =

Southern Sami religious magazine

Daerpies Dierie is a Southern Sámi church quarterly, founded in 1997 and headquartered in Snåsa Municipality, Norway. The magazine is financially supported by the Diocese of Härnösand in Sweden and the Diocese of Nidaros in Norway. The magazine's editor-in-chief and founder is Bierna Bientie. Articles are published in Swedish, Norwegian or Southern Sámi. The articles cover a wide range of topics, from Sami church life to more general news, church life, cultural life of the Sámi community.
