= Muitalægje =

Norwegian Northern Sámi-language newspaper

- Editor: Christian Andreassen
- Launched: April 1873
- Ceased publication: September 1875
- Language: Northern Sámi
- Headquarters: Čáhcesuolu, Norway

Muitalægje was the first newspaper to publish in a Sámi language. Launched in April 1873 in Čáhcesuolu, Norway, the paper published a total of 33 issues before folding in September 1875. The full title of the paper was Muittalægje Čuvgetusa Haliduvvidi Sámi Gaskast (Tales for Sámi Hungry for Education/Culture).

== History ==
Inspired by the Sámi teacher Peder Larsen Ucce's appeal for a Sámi-language newspaper to support the education of Sámi people who were not benefiting from the state's Norwegianization policy, Muitalægje was founded by Northern Sámi-speaking Norwegian Christian Andreassen, the chief of police in Buolbmát, who also wrote the majority of the paper's articles, teacher Johan Eriksen Soffa, and fisherman Samuel Samuelsen. Larsen served as co-editor of the paper. The paper's founders all belonged to Vieljažiid Searvi (The Brotherhood), an informal society of socially engaged Sámi in eastern Finnmark.

The paper was printed at F. Kjeldseth's printing office in Čáhcesuolu, which also printed the Norwegian-language Finmarkens Amtstidende newspaper.

Andreasen intended Muitalægje to encourage Sámi youth to look towards books for knowledge so they would learn more about the world outside the Sámi community and thus become more interested in public affairs and better willing able to advocate for Sámi rights. The paper also helped to preserve and promote the Northern Sámi language and to support Sámi identity as Norwegianization policies were being strengthened.
