= Nuorttanaste =

Northern Sámi religious publication

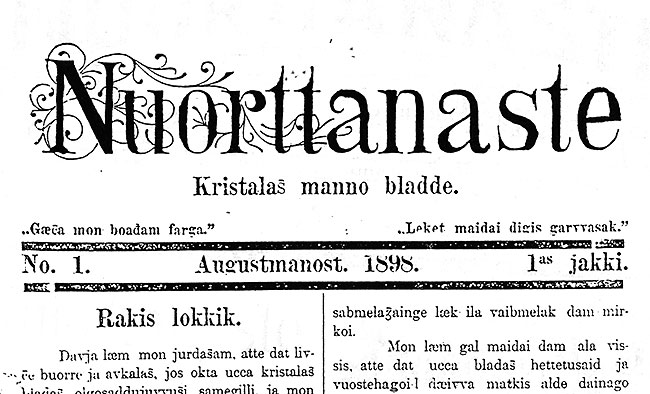
- Editor: Ann Solveig Nystad
- Launched: 1898
- Language: Northern Sámi
- Headquarters: Kárášjohka, Norway
- ISSN: 0333-418X
- Website: nuorttanaste.no

Nuorttanaste is a Northern Sámi religious publication based in Norway. It has published continuously since 1898, making it the longest running Sámi publication still being published.

== History ==
Nuorttanaste (modern Northern Sámi spelling Nuorttanásti), which means "The Eastern Star," was founded by "sled preacher" Gustav Lund, a travelling pastor of the Evangelical Lutheran Free Church of Norway who sought to evangelize Sámi in part by using their native tongue. In 1898, he founded Nuorttanaste in Finnmark, and the paper soon began publishing news articles and letters from readers alongside its religious content. The reporters and correspondents balanced the publisher's desire for religious content with readers' desire to receive news in their native language.

The first issue of Nuorttanaste was printed by Lund using a portable printing press. As the paper grew, it established formal offices in Sigerfjord. Over the years it moved several times before setting up its first permanent printing press was in Gáivuotna Municipality. The press alternated between Gáivuotna and Oslo for several years before setting up offices in Vuonnabahta in 1960. In 1992, the paper's headquarters moved to Kárášjohka.

For much of its history, including during World War II, Nuorttanaste published twice a month; it currently publishes 11 issues each year. It has subscribers in Norway, Sweden, and Finland.

=== Editors ===
- 1898–1912: Gustav Lund
- 1912–1916: Ole A. Andersen
- 1916–1948: Henrik Olsen Heika
- 1948–1960: Anders Guttormsen
- 1960–1992: John Ole Nilsen
- 1992–2003: Ann Solveig Nystad
- 2003–2013: Olaug Balto Larsson
- 2013–2016: Liv Tone Boine
- 2016–: Ann Solveig Nystad

== Cultural impact ==
For much of the 20th century, Nuorttanaste was the only newspaper publishing in Northern Sámi. Therefore, the paper played a major role in supporting Sámi literacy, along with Sámi language and culture.

For most of its publication history, Nuorttanaste has used the J.A. Friis orthography, which is the same writing system used for the Sámi Bible. From 1948 to 1958, the paper used the Bergsland–Ruong orthography, which was the standard for writing Northern Sámi in Norway and Sweden (but not Finland), before reverting to the J.A. Friis orthography. Since 2004, Nuorttanaste has used the pan-Scandinavian 1979 orthography.
