= Konrad Nielsen =

Norwegian philologist

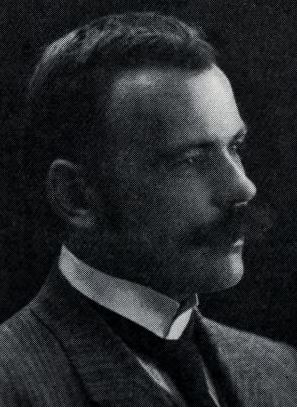
- Konrad Nielsen from 1911 book
- Born: 27 August 1875; Vik i Helgeland
- Died: 27 November 1953 (aged 78); Oslo
- Citizenship: Norwegian
- Education: University of Oslo; University of Helsinki
- Scientific career
- Fields: Sami languages other Finno-Ugric languages
- Workplaces: University of Oslo

Konrad Hartvig Isak Rosenvinge Nielsen (28 August 1875 – 27 November 1953) was a Norwegian philologist. He spent most of his career as a professor at the Royal Frederick University (University of Oslo) as a lecturer, textbook writer, lexicographer and translator. His specialty was Sami languages, also called Lapp languages in his day.

== Personal life and education ==
He was born in Vik i Helgeland as a son of politician Sivert Andreas Nielsen (1823–1904) and his wife Jonette Cornelie Falch Heide (1833–1925). In December 1924 he married Gudrun Augusta Agnes Müller (1889–1954). He was the father of diplomat Sivert Andreas Nielsen.

Nielsen's family moved from Vik to Bodø when Nielsen was eight years old. He finished his secondary education in 1892, and graduated from the Royal Frederick University with the cand.theol. degree in 1896. However, he changed his specialty to philology. In 1897 and 1898 he took exams in Kven and Sami languages, and from 1898 to 1899 he studied Finnish at the University of Helsinki.

== Career ==
In July 1899 Nielsen was appointed as a lecturer in Kven and Sami at the Royal Frederick University. In 1903 he took the dr.philos. degree at the University of Helsinki with the thesis Die Quantitätsverhältnisse im Polmak-lappischen, about the language in Polmak. He was promoted to professor of Finno-Ugric languages in 1911. He ultimately retired as a professor in 1946, but had several absences of leave between 1911 and 1946. Among others, he sat in Copenhagen as a member of the Reindeer Grazing Commission between 1913 and 1917. He was succeeded in 1947 by Knut Bergsland.

His main works were in the Norwegian language. He released the textbook Lærebok i lappisk in three volumes between 1926 and 1929, and the dictionary Lappisk ordbok – Lapp Dictionary in three volumes between 1932 and 1938. In addition, he was a translator. He also helped the Norwegian Geological Survey with Sami place names.

After the stay in Copenhagen, Nielsen lived with his family in Vettakollen. He also learned Turkish and Hungarian.

== Awards ==
He was a member of the Norwegian Academy of Science and Letters and the Hungarian Academy of Sciences, and held an honorary degree at the University of Tartu. He was decorated as a Knight, First Class of the Royal Norwegian Order of St. Olav in 1946, was a Commander of the Finnish Order of the White Rose and the Estonian Order of the Cross of the Eagle, and a Knight of the Swedish Order of the Polar Star. He died in November 1953 in Oslo.
