= Sámi University of Applied Sciences =

University of Applied Sciences in Norway

- Sámi allaskuvla
- Symbol
- Type: Public university college
- Established: 1989; 37 years ago
- Rector: Liv Inger Somby
- Faculty: 52
- Administrative staff: 100
- Students: 270
- Location: Kautokeino, Norway; 69°00′52″N 23°02′14″E
- Campus: Diehtosiida
- Website: samas.no
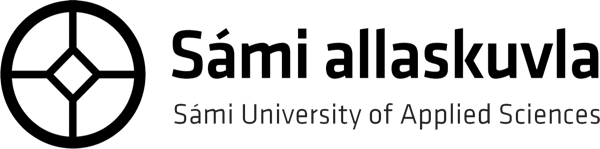

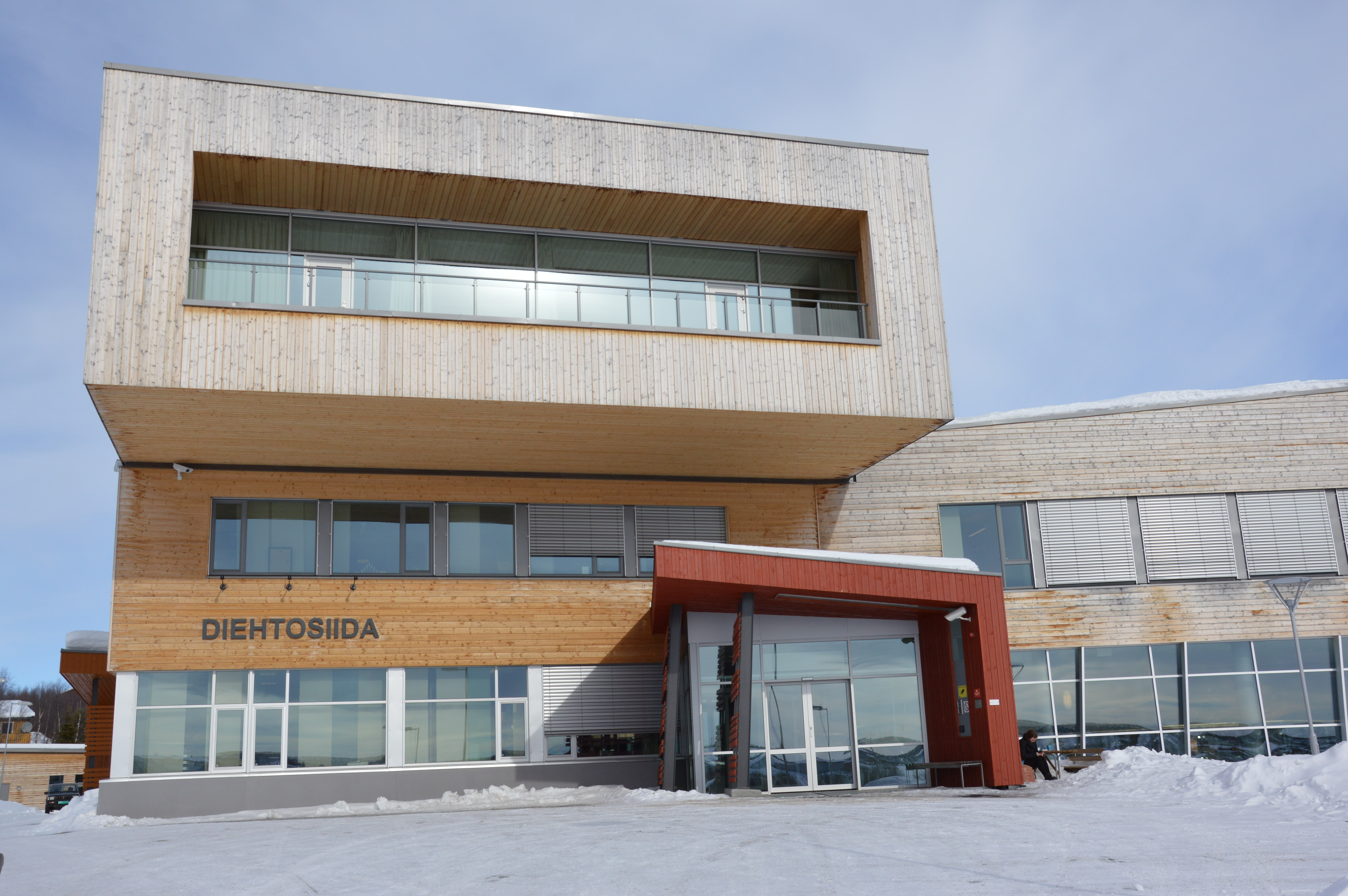
Diehtosiida building where the Sámi University of Applied Sciences is based

Sámi University of Applied Sciences (Northern Sami: Sámi allaskuvla, Norwegian: Samisk høgskole) is a university that is located in the village of Kautokeino in Kautokeino Municipality in Finnmark county, Norway. It was established in 1989 and has about 200 students and 110 faculty, technical and administrative staff. It is one of 25 Norwegian state university colleges. Since 2009 it has been located at the campus complex of Diehtosiida.

Sámi University of Applied Sciences has a national responsibility for Sámi higher education, including education within teaching and journalism. The college attempts to develop its syllabi on the basis of Sámi needs, and attempts to develop Sámi as an academic language. The college has students from all four countries covered by Sápmi.

== History ==
The Sámi University of Applied Sciences started operation on 1 January 1989 in Guovdageaidnu. Students from the Sámi department of the Alta school of education had been transferred to the new school the year prior; the students were studying duodji. Regular lessons were started 4 September. The school was officially opened on 1 November during Guovdageaidnu's cultural week.

In 2005, the Nordic Sámi Institute (Northern Sami: Sámi instituhtta) was merged into the university.

== International collaboration ==
The university is an active member of the University of the Arctic. UArctic is an international cooperative network based in the Circumpolar Arctic region, consisting of more than 200 universities, colleges, and other organizations with an interest in promoting education and research in the Arctic region.

The university also participates in UArctic's mobility program north2north. The aim of that program is to enable students of member institutions to study in different parts of the North.

== Notable people ==
- Britta Marakatt-Labba (born 1951) – Sámi textile artist
- Gunvor Guttorm (born 1958), Sami artist, art historian and academic
- Laila Susanne Vars (born 1976) – Norwegian-sámi lawyer and former politician
- Liv Inger Somby (born 1962), Sámi educator, writer, and journalist.
- Per Isak Juuso (born 1953) – Swedish-Sámi artisan and teacher
- Pigga Keskitalo (born 1972), Sámi politician and academic
