= Knut Bergsland =

Norwegian linguist (1914–1998)

- Born: 7 March 1914; Kristiania, Norway
- Died: 9 July 1998 (aged 84); Oslo, Norway

Academic background
- Education: Catholic University of Paris
- Thesis: Røros-lappisk grammatikk (1946)

Academic work
- Discipline: Uralic and Eskaleut linguistics
- Institutions: University of Oslo

Knut Bergsland (7 March 1914 – 9 July 1998) was a Norwegian linguist. Working as a professor at the University of Oslo from 1947 to 1981, he did groundbreaking research in Uralic (especially Sami) and Eskaleut languages.

== Career ==
He was born in Kristiania as a son of engineer Einar Christian Bergsland (1883–1945) and Henriette Louise Krogh Raabe (1883–1958). He was the brother of sports administrator Einar Bergsland. He finished his secondary education in 1932, and enrolled at the University of Oslo. He also studied at the École des Hautes Études and the Institut Catholique from 1935 to 1936. He graduated with the cand.philol. degree in 1940, having specialized in Latin, but now concentrated more on the Sami languages. His first linguistic work was a grammar of the Southern Sámi language, released as Røros-lappisk grammatikk in 1946. This work earned him the dr.philos. degree, and it is still the reference grammar of this language.

In 1947 Bergsland was appointed professor in Finno-Ugric languages at the University of Oslo, succeeding Konrad Nielsen. He continued his work on Sami languages, and also did important research in Eskaleut languages, firstly a historical grammar of Kalaallisut (or Western Greenlandic), and then a dictionary and reference grammar of Aleut. His interest in these languages arose during two stays as a visiting scholar; respectively at the University of Copenhagen in 1948 and the Indiana University at Bloomington in 1949–1950. He continued studying Aleut after retiring as a professor in 1981. Bergsland's professorship was vacant until 1987, when Ole Henrik Magga replaced him. Bergsland's final works were Aleut dictionary – Unangam tunudgusii (1994), Aleut Grammar (1997) and Ancient Aleut Personal Names (1998). He died in Oslo on 9 July 1998.

Bergsland held an honorary degree at the University of Helsinki.

== Bibliography ==
- Aleut Dialects of Atka and Attu (1959)
- (editor) Niiuis Maqaxtazaqangis: Atkan Historical Traditions (Alaska Native Language Center, 1986)
- (editor/translator) Nunamiut Stories (North Slope Borough Commission, 1987)
- Aleut Dictionary = Unangam tunudgusii: An Unabridged Lexicon of the Aleutian, Pribilof, and Cammander Islands Aleut Language (Alaska Native Language Center, 1994)
- Aleut Grammar (1997)
- Kadaangim Asangisangis = Ancient Aleut Personal Names: Materials from the Billings Expedition (1998)
