= Nordic Sámi Institute =

The Nordic Sami Institute is a research institution located at Guovdageaidnu (Kautokeino) in Norway. It is affiliated to Sámi University College. The mission of the institute is to strengthen and develop Sami languages, culture and social life. The institute is funded the Nordic Council of Ministers (a collaborative body of the Nordic governments), The Ministry of Education and Research (Norway), The Ministry of Education Research and Culture (Sweden), and The Ministry of Education (Finland).
