= Paavo Ravila =

Finnish linguist (1902–1974)

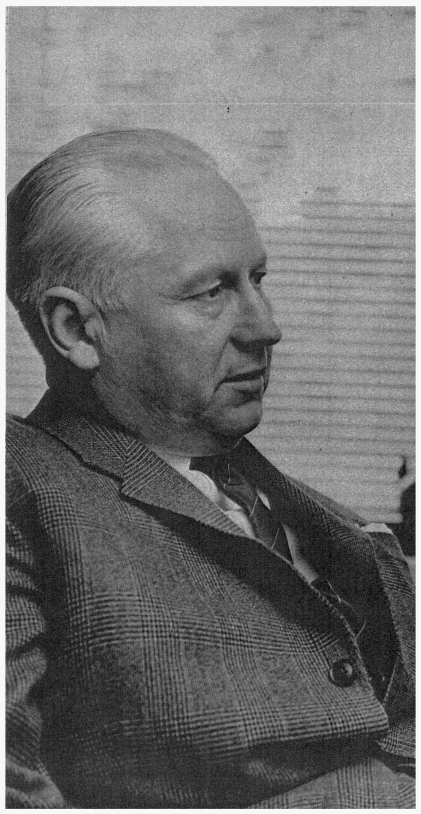
Paavo Ravila in 1960.

Paavo Ilmari Ravila (5 July 1902 – 16 April 1974) was a Finnish linguist and rector of the University of Helsinki.

== Biography ==
Ravila started his studies at the University of Turku in 1921, the same year the university was founded. He received his master's degree in philosophy 1924 and continued his education in Finno-Ugric languages at the University of Helsinki under professors Yrjö Wichmann, Frans Äimä and J. J. Mikkola. He earned his PhD in 1932 and was professor of Finnish and related languages at the University of Turku from 1934 to 1949. He spent the rest of his career at the University of Helsinki, first as professor of Finno-Ugric linguistics from 1949 to 1956, then as rector from 1953 to 1956 and finally as chancellor from 1963 to 1968. He lectured at the Indiana University Bloomington in 1951 and at Columbia University 1962–1963. During his stay at Indiana University, he took initiative to establishing a permanent chair for Finnish studies.

== Work ==
Ravila's interests included the languages of the Mordvins and the Sami people; his doctoral dissertation, Das Quantitätssystem des seelappischen Dialektes von Mattivuono (1932), was based on material he collected on expeditions in the 1930s. He was also interested in general linguistics, methodology and language philosophy, and published a well-received introduction to language history, Johdatus kielihistoriaan (1946). He was among the few scholars in Finland between 1940 and 1965 who were interested in the international development of theoretical linguistics, and he presented the new ideas, such as the proto-language concept and transformational syntax, to Finnish audience. He took a skeptical stance towards some of the new developments, especially transformational generative grammar. In 1966, he published Finnish Literary Reader, a selection of prosaic and lyrical texts by representative Finnish authors.

As a university administrator, Ravila had significant influence on Finnish research and university policy in the 1950s and 1960s. In 1958, in a speech to the Finno-Ugrian Society, he suggested establishing a professorship in general linguistics at the University of Helsinki, which became a reality in 1966.

== Honors and memberships ==
Ravila was elected member of the Finnish Academy of Science and Letters in 1944 and of the Finnish Society of Sciences and Letters in 1955. He was appointed corresponding member of the Learned Estonian Society in 1938 and foreign member of the Royal Gustavus Adolphus Academy in 1956. He was a member of the Academy of Finland from 1956 to 1963, when he was appointed its president. He was also president of the Finno-Ugrian Society for 14 years.
