= 2005 Norwegian Sámi parliamentary election =

- 12 September 2005
- All 43 seats in the Sámi Parliament; 22 seats needed for a majority
- Turnout: 71.2% ▲5.0
Party	Leader	Vote %	Seats	+/–
Labour		31.9%	18	+5
NSR		26.3%	16	+5
Centre		6.7%	1	−2
SFF		5.0%	0	−2
SáB		3.9%	1	0
NSR/SáB		3.0%	1	New
Kautokeino Reindeer Herders List		2.8%	1	0
Sámi People's Association		2.7%	1	New
Finnmark List		1.8%	1	New
Sámi Residents in Southern Norway		1.8%	1	0
Non-Reindeer Herders List		1.8%	1	0
Southern List		1.6%	1	New
This lists parties that won seats. See the complete results below.
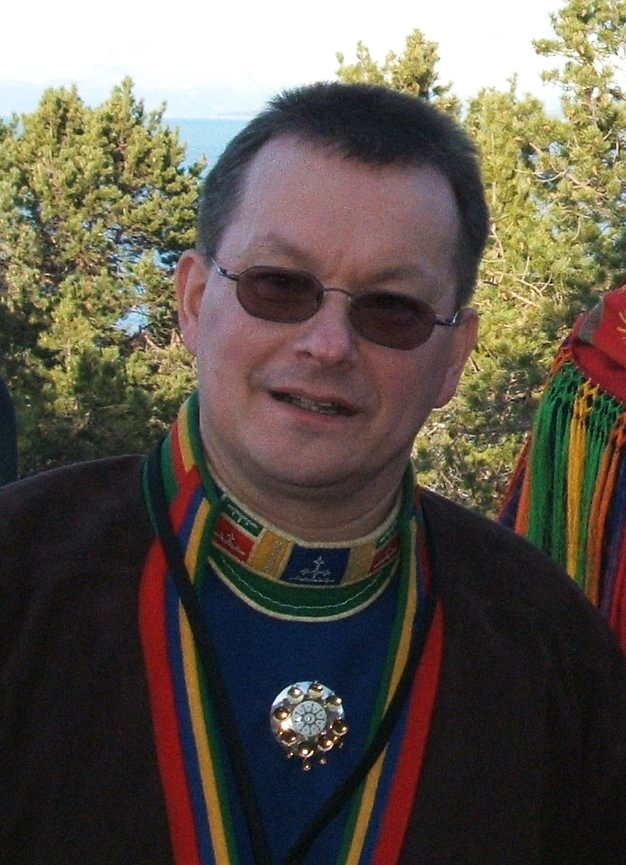

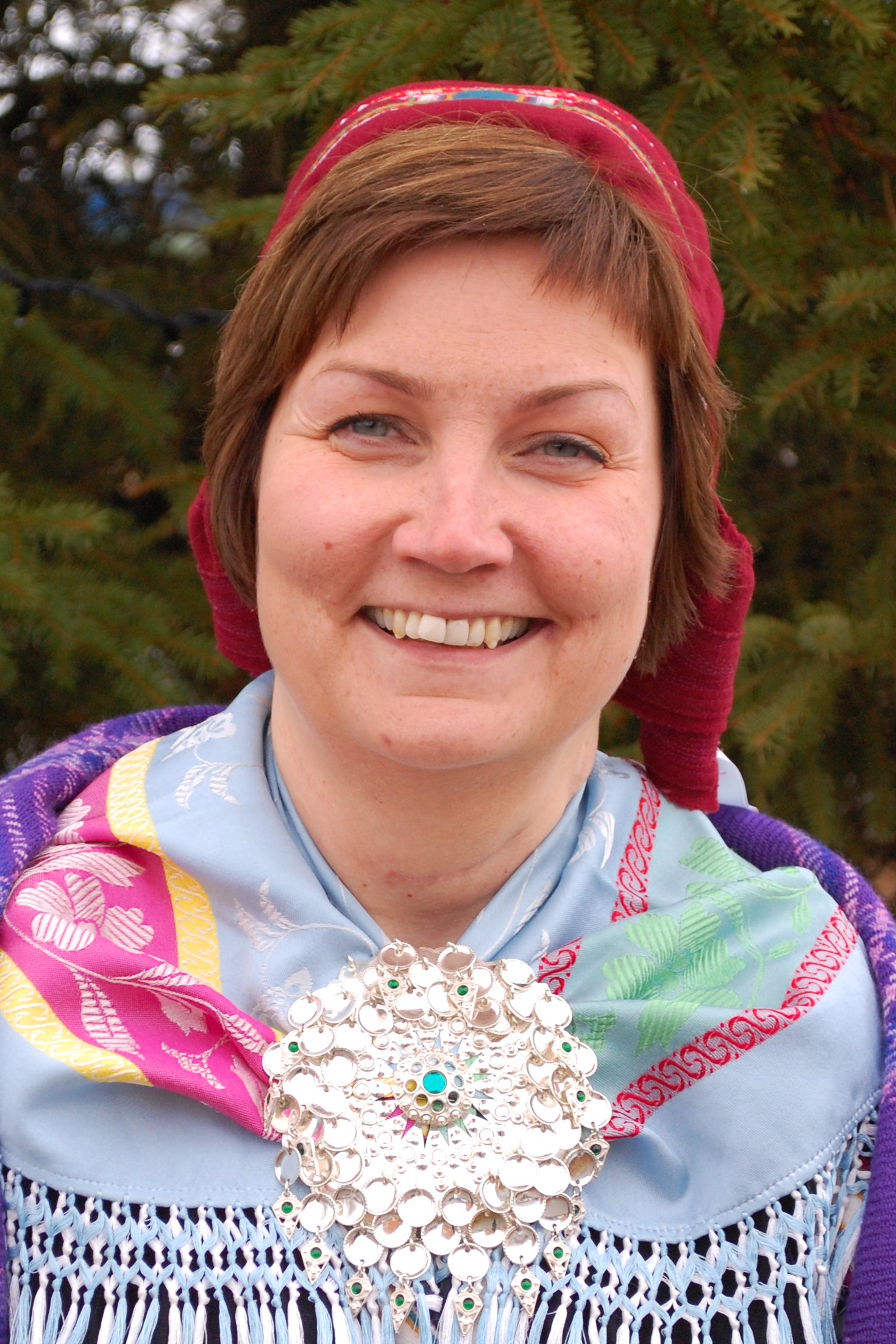
President of the Sámi Parliament before	President of the Sámi Parliament after
Sven-Roald Nystø; NSR	Aili Keskitalo; NSR

The 2005 Sámi parliamentary election was held in Norway on 12 September 2005. Voters elected 43 members for the Sámi Parliament of Norway.

== Constituencies ==
Norway was divided into 13 constituencies for the 2005 Sámi parliamentary election. For each, three representatives were elected. In addition an additional representative was elected from the four constituencies with the most votes. For the 2005 election, the constituencies were:

=== Constituencies in Finnmark county ===
Várjjat

- This constituency included the municipalities of Sør-Varanger, Unjárga (Nesseby), Vadsø, Vardø and Båtsfjord.
- Representatives (2005-2009): Magnhild Mathisen, Gunn-Britt Retter, and Knut Store
- It had the highest electoral turnout in 2005 (79.1%).

Deatnu

- This constituency included Deatnu Municipality (Tana), Berlevåg Municipality, and Gamvik Municipality.
- Representatives (2005-2009): Marianne Balto Henriksen, Jánoš Trosten, and Per Ivar Henriksen.

Kárášjohka

- This constituency included Kárášjohka Municipality (Karasjok).
- Representatives (2005-2009): Egil Olli, Terje H. Tretnes, Synnøve Solbakken-Härkönen, and Marie Therese Nordsletta Gaup.

Guovdageaidnu

- This constituency included Guovdageaidnu Municipality (Kautokeino).
- Representatives (2005-2009): Aili Keskitalo, Per Andersen Bæhr, Isak Mathis O. Hætta, and Klemet Erland Hætta.
- The largest constituency in 2005 (1,313 eligible voters).
- Most votes per members in 2005 election (277).

Porsáŋgu

- This constituency included Porsáŋgu Municipality (Porsanger), Lebesby Municipality, Nordkapp Municipality, and Måsøy Municipality.
- Representatives (2005-2009): Josef Ingmar Vedhugnes, Olaf Eliassen, and Wiebke Synnøve Slåtsveen.

Áltá/Fálesnuorri

- This constituency included Kvalsund Municipality, Hammerfest Municipality, Alta Municipality, Hasvik Municipality and Loppa Municipality.
- Representatives (2005-2009): Per Edvind Varsi, John Harald Skum, Toril Bakken, and Inger Jørstad.

=== Constituencies in Troms county ===
Davvi Romsa

- This constituency included Kvænangen Municipality, Nordreisa Municipality, Skjervøy Municipality, Gáivuotna Municipality (Kåfjord), Storfjord Municipality, and Lyngen Municipality.
- Representatives (2005-2009): Willy Ørnebakk, Tor Mikalsen, and Hilde Anita Nyvoll Vangen.

Gaska Romsa

- This constituency included Karlsøy Municipality, Tromsø Municipality, Balsfjord Municipality, Målselv Municipality, Bardu Municipality, Lenvik Municipality, Berg Municipality, Torsken Municipality, and Tranøy Municipality.
- Representatives (2005-2009): Randi A. Skum, Bjarne Store-Jakobsen, and Lene Hansen.

Lulli Romsa

- This constituency included the municipalities of Sørreisa, Dyrøy, Salangen, Lavangen, Gratangen, Skånland, Ibestad, Harstad, Bjarkøy, and Kvæfjord.
  - Representatives (2005-2009): Ann-Mari Thomassen, Berit Oskal Eira, and Susanne Amalie Andersen.

=== Constituencies in Nordland county ===
Davvi Nordland

- This constituency included the municipalities of Andøy, Øksnes, Bø, Sortland, Hadsel, Vågan, Vestvågøy, Flakstad, Moskenes, Værøy, Røst, Lødingen, Tjeldsund, Evenes, and Narvik).
- Representatives (2005-2009): Kjersti Myrnes Balto, Vibeke Larsen, and Roger Pedersen.
- The smallest constituency in 2005 (283 eligible voters).
- Fewest votes per members in 2005 election (63).

Gaska Nordland

- This constituency included the municipalities of Ballangen, Tysfjord, Hamarøy, Steigen, Sørfjord, Bodø, Fauske, Saltdal, Gildeskål, Beiarn, and Meløy).
- Representatives (2005-2009): Tone Finnesen, Anders Urheim, and Miriam Paulsen.

=== Constituencies in Central and Southern Norway ===
Lullisámeguovllut

- This constituency included all of the other municipalities in Nordland plus Engerdal Municipality in Hedmark county and all municipalities in Nord-Trøndelag and Sør-Trøndelag counties.
- Representatives (2005-2009): Jarle Jonassen, Sten Erling Jønsson, and Kirsten Appfjell.

Lulli Norga

- This constituency included the municipalities in the counties of Hedmark (except Engerdal), Møre og Romsdal, Sogn og Fjordane, Hordaland, Rogaland, Vest-Agder, Aust-Agder, Telemark, Buskerud, Vestfold, Akershus, Østfold, Oppland and Oslo)
- Representatives (2005-2009): Rita-Alise Porsanger, Jørn Are Gaski, Johan Mikkel Sara, and Kirsti Guvsám.
- The lowest electoral turnout in 2005 (66.8%)

=== Outcome ===
The results of the vote where that:

- Norwegian Sámi Association got 18 representatives (and for the first time did not have the majority in the parliament).
- Labour Party also got 18 representatives.
- Johttisápmelaččaid Listu, Åarjel læstoe, Sámi People's Party, Finnmark list, Dáloniid Listu, Centre Party, and an unaffiliated Sámi resident in Southern Norway each got 1 representative.

Since no party had a majority of the mandates a coalition was formed for the executive council consisting of: Norwegian Sámi Association, Sámi resident in Southern Norway, Johttisápmelaččaid Listu, Centre Party, and Sámi People's Party. Aili Keskitalo from the Norwegian Sámi Association was elected as the president. Johan Mikkel Sara, Sámi resident in Southern Norway, got the vice president position, while Per A. Bær got a seat in the board of the Finnmark Estate. The six members in the executive council consisted in addition to the president and vice-president of: Terje Tretnes (Sámi People's Party), Randi A. Skum, and Jarle Jonassen (the later both from Norwegian Sámi Association).

Later Jánoš Trosten left Norwegian Sámi Association and formed his own party, Čielga Sámi Jietna, while Anders Urheim left the Labour party and formed the Sosialdemokraten group. Thus leaving, the two largest parties with 17 mandates each.

After the election in 2005 Aili Keskitalo became president. She represents the Norwegian Sámi Association. On September 25 she resigned after the coalition forming the executive council was split up due to problems cooperating with vice president Johan Mikkel Sara.

On September 26, Labour Party formed an executive council consisting of: the new president Egil Olli, new vice-president Marianne Balto, Jørn Are Gaski, Hilde Nyvoll, and Vibeke Larsen. The Labour Party does not have the majority in the parliament.

=== Gender ===
One particularly remarkable facet of the Sámi parliamentary elections of 2005 was the outcome of 50% women being elected into parliamentary seats, as compared to the 37% of seats occupied by women in the non-Sámi Norwegian parliament. Through an active effort to foster women's participation in Sámi politics, no less than 22 women were elected to the 43 seats in the Sámi Parliament, up from 7 in 2001. Also in 2005, Aili Keskitalo, a woman, was elected as Parliamentary President, a position similar to Speaker of the House in the USA. She was the third parliamentary president of the Sámi Parliament of Norway and the first female president of any Sámi parliament, though she resigned in 2007 (see above). Taking her place was a man, Egil Olli, whereas the vice-president of parliament was a woman, Marianne Balto.

== Results ==
Election results for the 2005 Sámi parliamentary election. Voter turnout was 71.2%.

Party	Votes	%	Seats	+/–
Labour Party	2,843	31.85	18	+5
Norwegian Sámi Association	2,351	26.34	16	+5
Centre Party	602	6.74	1	–2
People's Federation of the Saami	442	4.95	0	–2
Sámi People's Party	345	3.87	1	0
Socialist Left Party	306	3.43	0	New
Sámi People's Party and Norwegian Sami	265	2.97	1	–
Kautokeino Reindeer Herders List	254	2.85	1	0
Sámi People's Association	240	2.69	1	New
Conservative Party	219	2.45	0	–1
Progress Party	201	2.25	0	New
Finnmark List	164	1.84	1	New
Sámi Residents in Southern Norway	163	1.83	1	0
Non-Reindeer Herders List	158	1.77	1	0
Southern List	139	1.56	1	New
Badjeolbmuid Listu	106	1.19	0	New
Liberal Party	62	0.69	0	0
Middle Nordland Non-Partisan List	38	0.43	0	New
Sami Red Electoral Alliance	28	0.31	0	New
Total	8,926	100.00	43	+4
Registered voters/turnout	12,538	–		

== See also ==
- 2005 Norwegian parliamentary election
