= 2017 Norwegian Sámi parliamentary election =

Election for the Sámi Parliament

- 11 September 2017
- All 39 seats in the Sámi Parliament; 20 seats needed for a majority
- Turnout: 70.3% ▲2.5
Party	Leader	Vote %	Seats	+/–
NSR	Aili Keskitalo	28.09	18	+7
Labour	Ronny Wilhelmsen	16.99	9	−1
NKF	Toril Bakken Kåven	6.75	3	0
Centre	Jan Ole Klemet Hermansen	7.56	2	+2
Árja	Inger Eline Eriksen	7.75	1	−2
Progress	Arthur Tørfoss	7.48	1	−1
Conservative		6.40	1	−1
Moving Sámi List		2.48	1	0
SáB		2.02	1	0
Åarjel-Saemiej Gielh	Ellinor Marita Jåma	1.70	1	−1
Residents List		1.51	1	
This lists parties that won seats. See the complete results below.
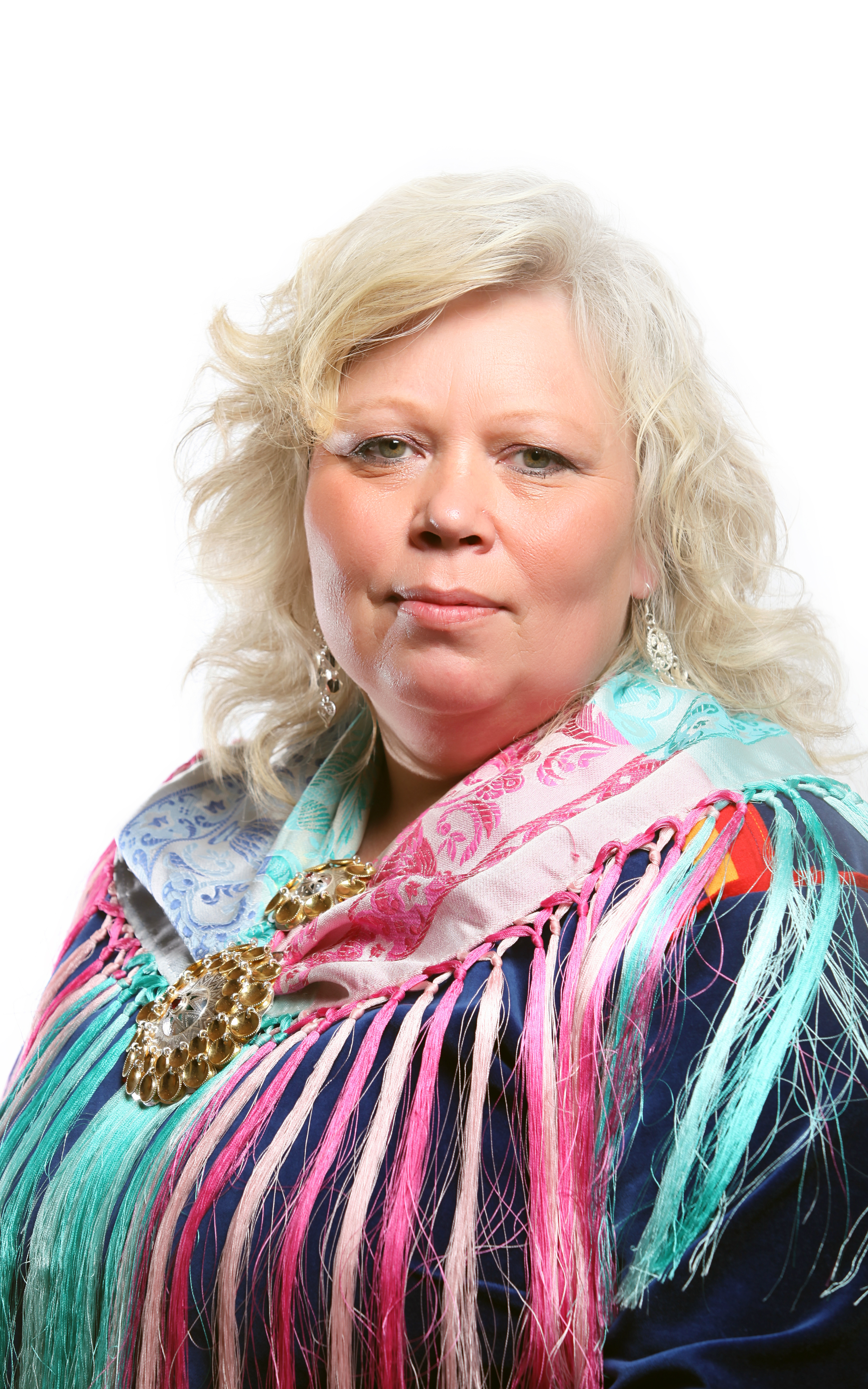

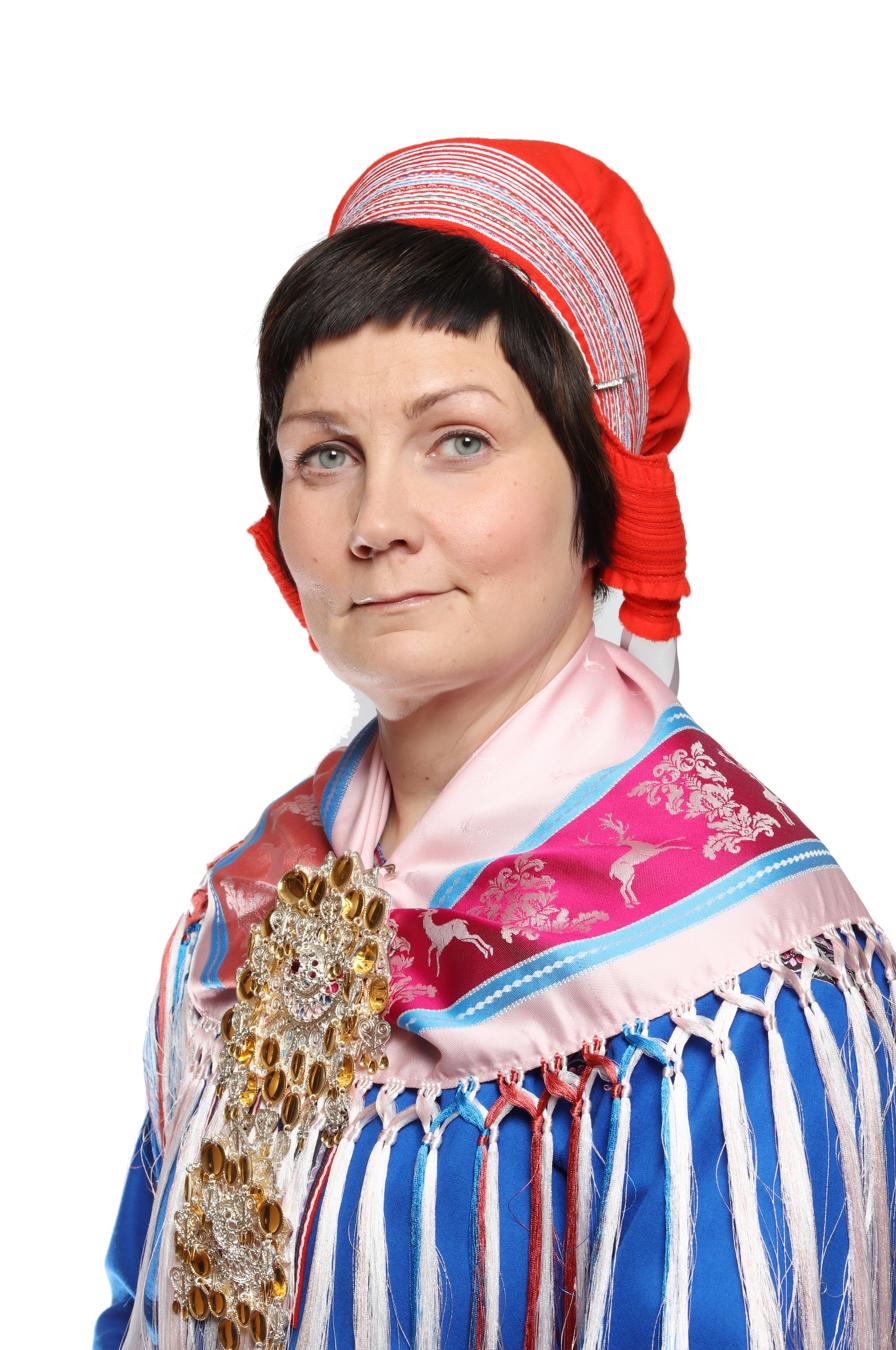
President of the Sámi Parliament before	President of the Sámi Parliament after
Vibeke Larsen; Independent	Aili Keskitalo; NSR

The 2017 Norwegian Sámi parliamentary election was held on 11 September 2017. All 39 seats in the Norwegian Sámi legislature, the Sámediggi, were up for election.

== Background ==
=== Previous election ===
In the previous election, held on 9 September 2013, the Norwegian Sámi Association, with former President of the Sámi Parliament Aili Keskitalo as their presidential candidate, won a plurality, with 11 of the 39 seats, including 2 on a joint list with the Sami People's Party. The Norwegian Sámi Association formed a minority administration on the Governing Council supported by the Labour Party, Árja and Åarjel-Saemiej Gielh. Keskitalo took office as president on 16 October after being elected by the Parliament. The Labour Party, which had governed from 2007, returned to the opposition.

=== 2016–17 political crisis ===
In December 2016, the budget proposed by Keskitalo's Governing Council was rejected by the Parliament, which instead voted for an alternative budget proposed by the Labour Party, Conservative Party, and Árja. A successful vote of no confidence followed. On 8 December 2016, Aili Keskitalo resigned and the Parliament elected Labour's Vibeke Larsen as her replacement, with a coalition consisting of Labour, the Conservative Party, and Árja.

On 28 January 2017, the Labour Party held a political council to select a new presidential candidate after the withdrawal of Helga Pedersen. Pedersen had withdrawn as presidential candidate in December 2016 in opposition to the vote of no confidence, which she had strongly advised against and refused to defend. Ronny Wilhelmsen was nominated, defeating incumbent President Vibeke Larsen by 21 votes to 17 on the second ballot. Larsen subsequently announced her intention to resign as president, before announcing the next day that she would leave the Labour Party and continue as a political independent, citing a "use and throw away mentality" within the party. Larsen additionally fired Wilhlemsen as her vice president due to a lack of trust.

=== Presidential candidates ===
The Norwegian Sámi Association re-nominated Aili Keskitalo as their presidential candidate. The Labour Party nominated Ronny Wilhelmsen, who served as Vice President of the Sámi Parliament prior to his firing in January 2017. Árja nominated Inger Eline Eriksen, member of the Governing Council. Nordkalottfolket nominated their leader, Toril Bakken Kåven. Vibeke Larsen formed her own political party, Šiella, and ran is its presidential candidate.

== Results ==
Party	Votes	%	Seats	+/–
Norwegian Sámi Association	3,303	28.09	16	+5
Labour Party	1,998	16.99	9	–1
Árja	911	7.75	1	–3
Centre Party	889	7.56	2	+2
Progress Party	879	7.48	1	–1
Nordkalottfolket	772	6.57	3	0
Conservative Party	752	6.40	1	–1
NSR–SáB	493	4.19	2	0
Ávjovári Moving Sámi List	291	2.48	1	0
Šiella	272	2.31	0	New
Sámi People's Party	238	2.02	1	+1
People's Federation of the Saami	204	1.74	0	New
Åarjel-Saemiej Gïelh	200	1.70	1	–1
Guovdageainnu Residents List	177	1.51	1	New
Sámi Democrats–Šiella	117	1.00	0	New
Jiehkkevárri	82	0.70	0	New
Sámieana	78	0.66	0	New
List of Permanent Residents	76	0.65	0	New
Socialist Left Party	25	0.21	0	0
Total	11,757	100.00	39	0
Valid votes	11,757	98.36		
Invalid/blank votes	196	1.64		
Total votes	11,953	100.00		
Registered voters/turnout	16,958	70.49		
Source: Valgresultat.no

== See also ==
- 2017 Norwegian parliamentary election
