= 2009 Norwegian Sámi parliamentary election =

- 14 September 2009
- All 43 seats in the Sámi Parliament; 22 seats needed for a majority
- Turnout: 68.0% ▼3.2
Party	Leader	Vote %	Seats	+/–
Labour		26.8%	14	−4
NSR		21.0%	11	−5
Árja		10.0%	3	New
Progress		7.8%	3	+3
Kautokeino Reindeer Herders List		4.4%	2	New
NSR/SfP		3.9%	2	New
Conservative		4.7%	1	+1
Sámi Residents in Southern Norway		2.0%	1	0
NKF		2.0%	1	New
Åarjel-Saemiej Gielh		1.6%	1	New
This lists parties that won seats. See the complete results below.
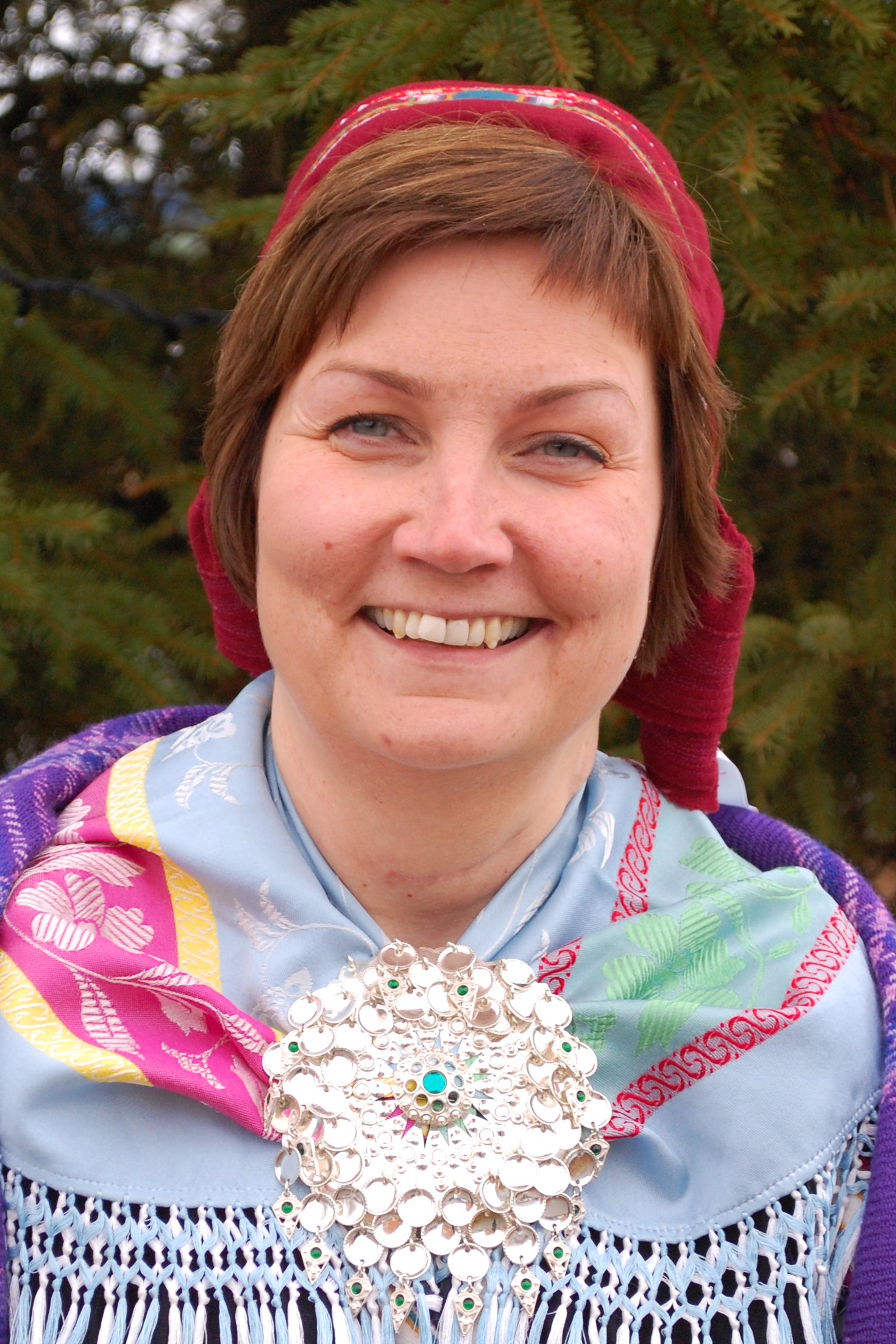

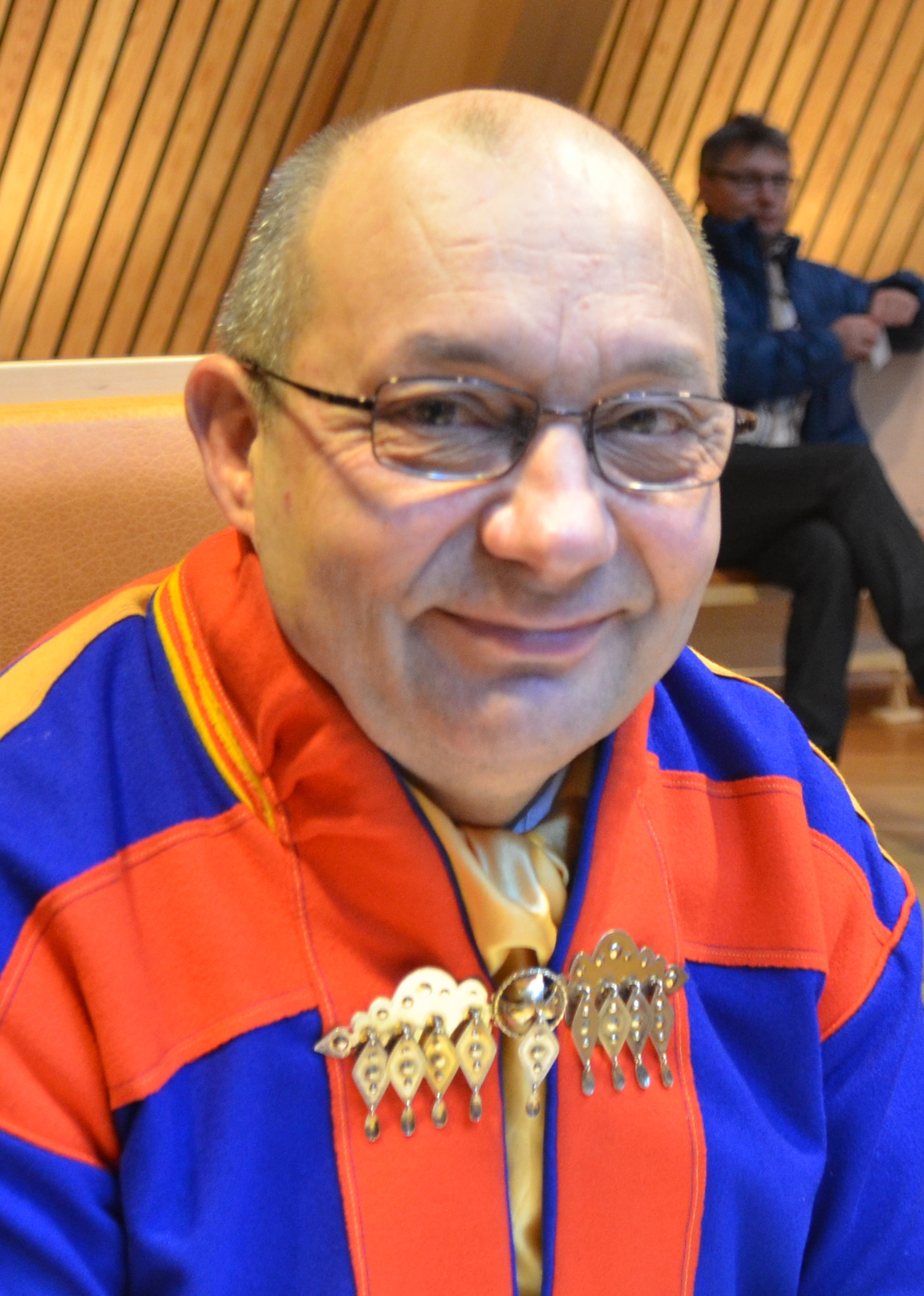
President of the Sámi Parliament before	President of the Sámi Parliament after
Aili Keskitalo; NSR	Egil Olli; Labour

The 2009 Sámi parliamentary election was held in Norway on 14 September 2009. Voters elected 39 members for the Sámi Parliament of Norway.

The election saw significant losses for the two dominant parties in the Sámi Parliament, the Norwegian Labour Party and Norwegian Sámi Association. Two third parties made a breakthrough, the new Árja and the Progress Party, with three seats each.

== Negotiations ==
Both the Labour Party and Norwegian Sámi Association had refused to cooperate with the Progress Party, who notably seek the dismantling of the Sámi Parliament. While both Labour and NSR were reluctant to give hold to a so-called "minor party tyranny", the parties also thought it unlikely to establish a Sámi Parliament Council together, but held that it could not be ruled entirely out. Both parties sought cooperation with the Árja Party. Árja held that they could cooperate with all parties, with the likely exception of the Progress Party, citing it "could be problematic". Árja mainly sought to establish a "bloc" together with the Kautokeino reindeer herders list, while also negotiating with both the main parties, as well as Nordkalottfolket.

=== Result ===
In the end, a majority Sámi Parliament Council was elected, supported by the Labour Party (14 seats), Árja (3), Nordkalottfolket (1), Åarjel-Saemiej Gielh (1), and an unaffiliated Sámi resident of Southern Norway (1). The Sámi Parliament Council itself, consisted of Egil Olli (Labour) as President, Láilá Susanne Vars (Árja) as Vice President, and the council members Ellinor Marita Jåma (Åarjel-Saemiej Gielh), Marianne Balto (Labour) and Vibeke Larsen (Labour). The council was later complained in to the Control Committee by Labour politician Åge Nils Haugen, as the council violated its own equal rights laws, as it consisted of four women and only one man. The complaint was also supported by the Progress Party.

== Results ==
Election results for the 2009 Sámi parliamentary election. Voter turnout was 68.0%.

Party	Votes	%	Seats	+/–
Labour Party	2,534	26.82	14	–4
Norwegian Sámi Association	1,986	21.02	11	–5
Árja	949	10.04	3	New
Progress Party	737	7.80	3	+3
Centre Party	466	4.93	0	–1
Conservative Party	439	4.65	1	+1
Kautokeino Reindeer Herders List	411	4.35	2	New
NSR–SáB	366	3.87	2	New
People's Federation of the Saami	297	3.14	0	0
Sámi People's Party	221	2.34	0	–1
Sámi Residents in Southern Norway	191	2.02	1	0
Nordkalottfolket	184	1.95	1	New
Åarjel-Saemiej Gielh	146	1.55	1	New
Non-Reindeer Herders List	124	1.31	0	New
Common List	110	1.16	0	New
Ofelas	75	0.79	0	New
Socialist Left Party	64	0.68	0	0
Sjaddo	55	0.58	0	0
Christian Democratic Party	48	0.51	0	New
Liberal Party	45	0.48	0	0
Total	9,448	100.00	39	–4

== See also ==
- 2009 Norwegian parliamentary election
