= 2013 Norwegian Sámi parliamentary election =

Election for the Sámi Parliament

- 9 September 2013
- All 39 seats in the Sámi Parliament; 20 seats needed for a majority
- Turnout: 67.8% ▼0.2
| Party | Leader | Vote % | Seats | +/– |
|---|---|---|---|---|
| NSR | Aili Keskitalo | 24.2% | 11 | 0 |
| Labour | Vibeke Larsen | 21.1% | 10 | −4 |
| Árja | Laila Susanne Vars | 11.5% | 4 | +1 |
| NKF | Toril Bakken Kåven | 4.3% | 3 | +2 |
| Progress | Aud Martinsen | 9.0% | 2 | −1 |
| Conservative | Anne-Marit Eira | 7.0% | 2 | +1 |
| NSR/SfP | Beaska Niillas | 4.7% | 2 | 0 |
| Åarjel-Saemiej Gielh | Ellinor Marita Jåma | 2.1% | 2 | +1 |
| Kautokeino Residents List | Isak Mathis O. Hætta | 2.7% | 1 | +1 |
| Moving Sámi List | Per A. Bæhr | 3.3% | 1 | −1 |
| Sámi in the South | Marie Therese Nordsletta Aslaksen | 1.2% | 1 | +1 |
This lists parties that won seats. See the complete results below.
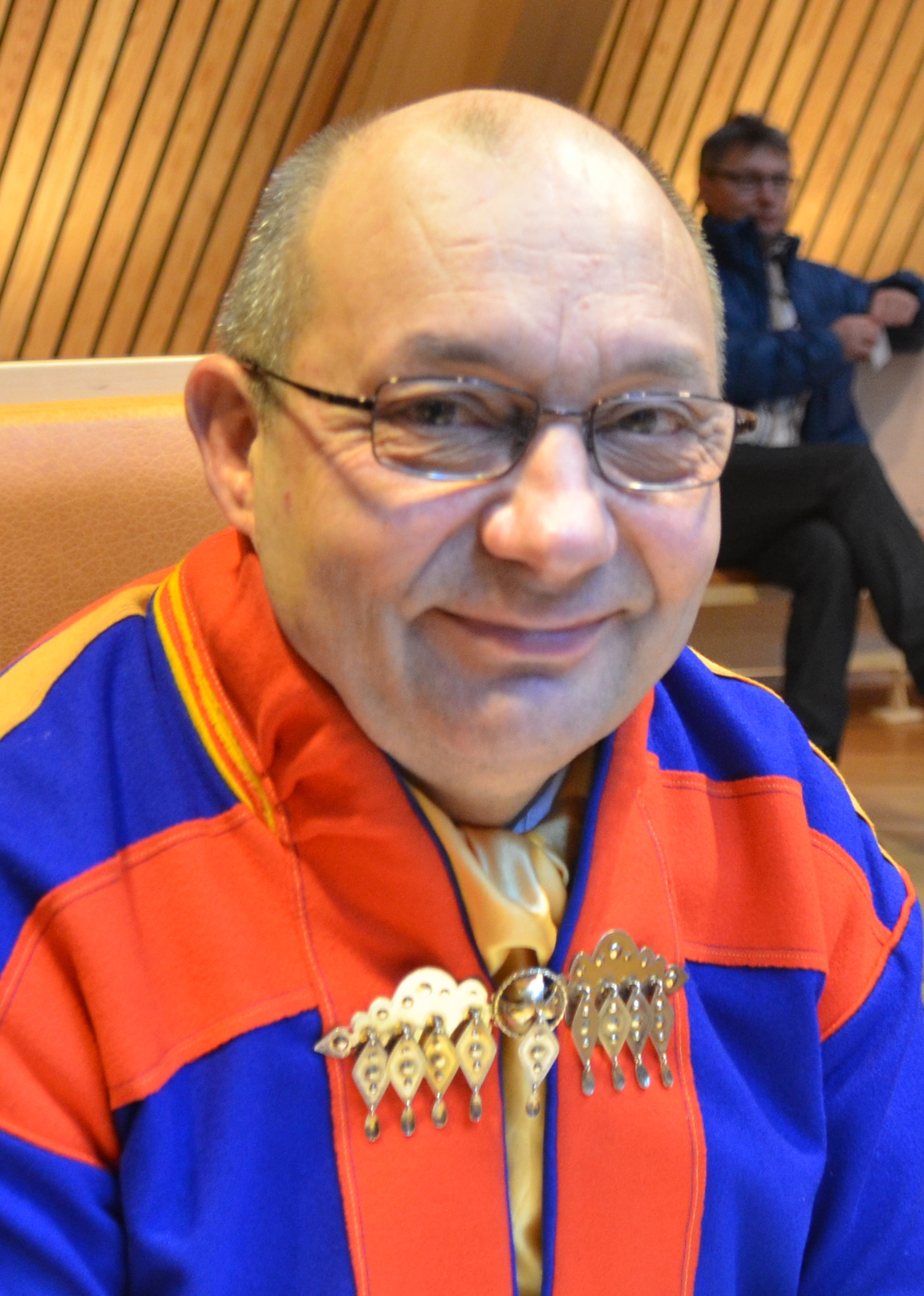

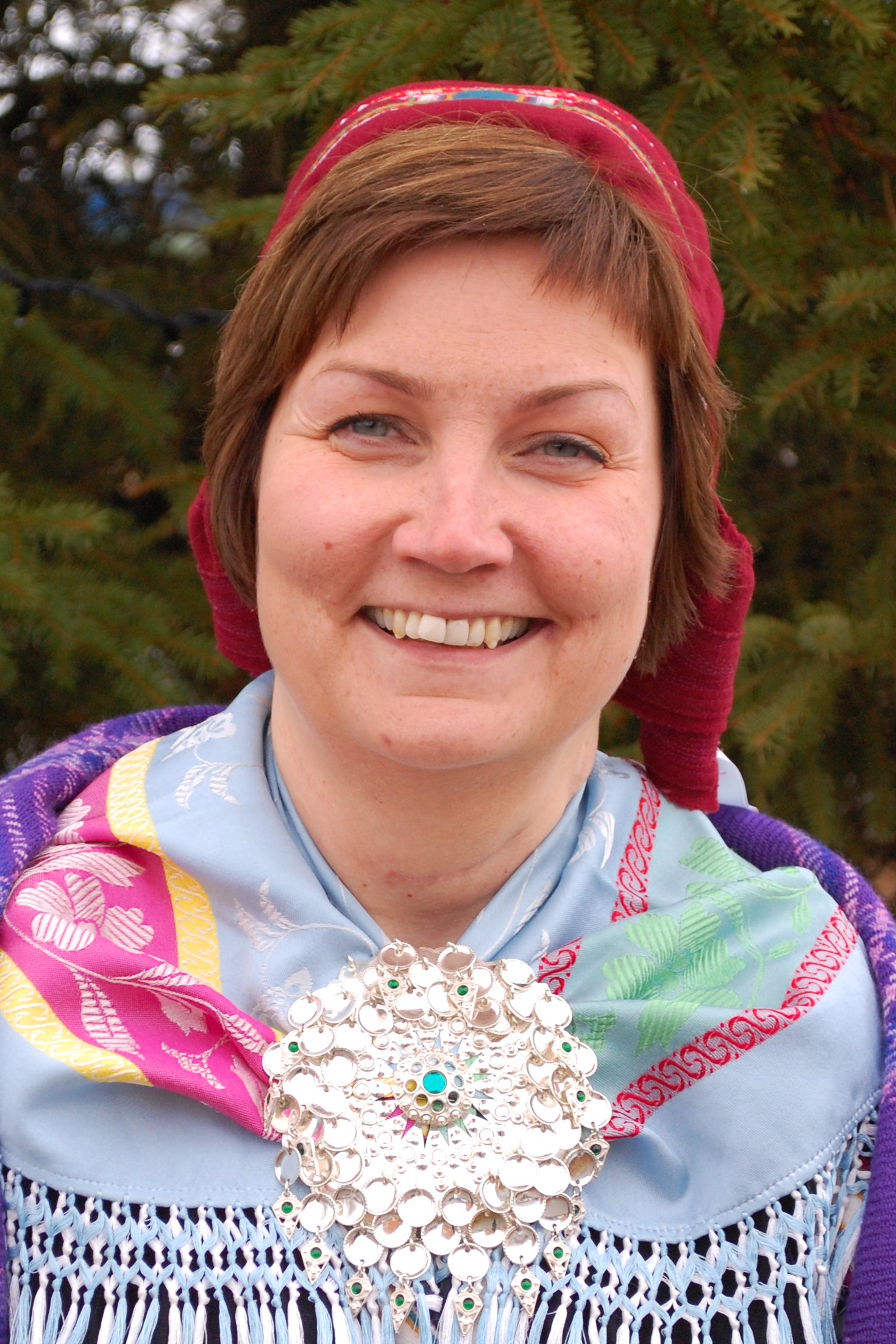
| President of the Sámi Parliament before | President of the Sámi Parliament after |
|---|---|
| Egil Olli; Labour | Aili Keskitalo; NSR |

The 2013 Norwegian Sámi parliamentary election was held on 9 September 2013, simultaneously with the 2013 Norwegian parliamentary election. All 39 seats in the Norwegian Sámi parliament, the Sámediggi, were up for election.

The election resulted in a hung parliament, with Aili Keskitalo of the Norwegian Sámi Association taking the presidency through a minority coalition.

== Background ==
Sámi parliament elections are held simultaneously with the Norwegian parliament elections. Voters elect a total of 39 representatives from seven total constituencies. The election was held on 9 September 2013 in communities with over 30 citizens on the electoral roll, communities with under 30 registered require their citizens to vote in advance between 1 July and 6 September 2013. Voting is eligible for those over 18 years of age, including those who turn 18 by the end of the election year. Voters are entered into the Sámi parliament electoral roll, which requires individuals to meet certain criteria and individual registration.

Before the election, the governing coalition was between the Labour Party, Árja, and Åarjel-Saemiej Gielh.

=== Presidential candidates ===
The Labour Party nominated Vibeke Larsen, the Norwegian Sámi Association nominated Aili Keskitalo, Arja nominated Láilá Susanne Vars, and the Progress Party nominated Aud Martinsen. The Centre Party would nominate Helge Guttormsen, but wound up with no seats.

Larsen was selected over Mariann Wollmann Magga to be the Labour Party's candidate for president. Wollmann Magga was on a joint ticket with Johan Vasara as vice president. For vice president, the Labour Party had four candidates contesting the party's nomination: Jørn Are Gaski, John Kappfjell, Johan Vasara, and Ronny Wilhelmsen. After three rounds, Vasara defeated Wilhelmsen 12–9. Willy Ørnebakk, who had previously floated his interest in running as the Labour Party's nominee, withdrew and resigned from the party. Ørnebakk cited a certain culture within the Labour Party which had led him to feel insecurity as a potential president.

== Campaign ==
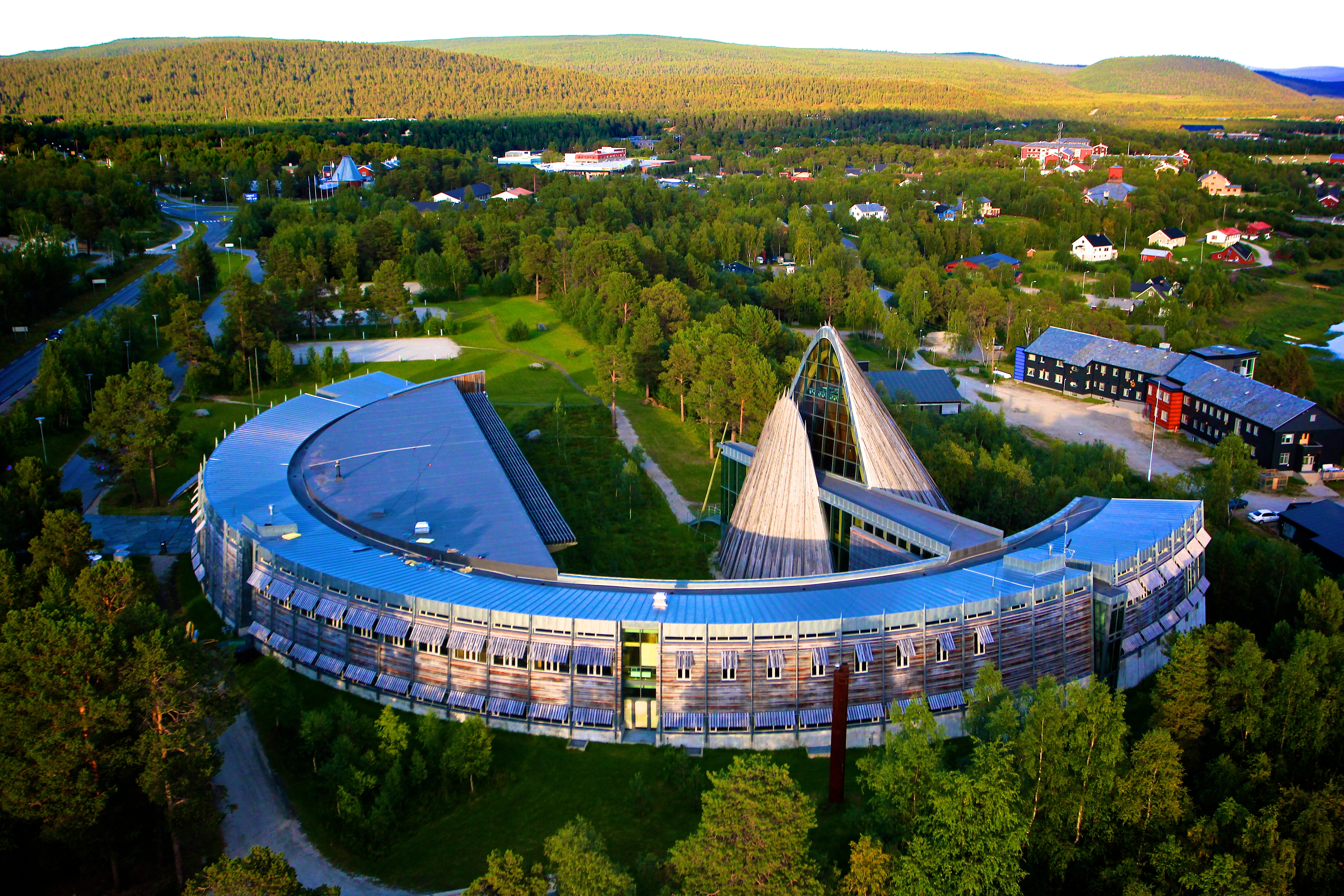
Due to their policy advocating for the abolition of the Sámi Parliament, the Progress Party was excluded from any potential coalition discussions

NRK Sápmi held debates between the various presidential candidates, a four party online meeting was held on August 21, 2013, with Vibeke Larsen (Labor Party), Laila Susanne Vars (Árja), Aili Keskitalo (NSR), and Helge Guttormsen (Sp) all participating. Among topics discussed were: Sámi resource extraction and infrastructure development, cultural investment, language promotion, reindeer husbandry, potential coalition partners, and schooling.

Labor and Árja's nominees stated their opposition to collaborating with the Progress Party due to the party's stance on abolishing the parliament, while simultaneously indicating their openness to collaborating with all other parties. Centre's nominee stated that the Progress Party would not be a major factor in coalition building, and indicated their interest in a red-green coalition.

Nordkalottfolket highlighted their focus on culture, industry, and closeness towards nature, as well as highlighting a need for a balance between Norwegian, Sámi, and Kven culture. For the first time, the Nordkalottfolket list would be put forth for a southern constituency, having only previously ran in the north. Nordkalottfolket expressed their interest for the transformation of the Sámi Parliament into a joint Sámi and Kven parliament. Vibeke Larsen of the Labor Party expressed her opposition to the proposal, highlighting the cultural distinction between the Kven people and the Sámi, alternatively suggesting that the Kven should establish their own parliament.

The Conservative Party's Sámi parliamentary leader Anne-Marit Eira indicated her support put forward by the youth chapter Unge Høyre to shut down the Sámi Parliament in exchange for reserved seats in the Storting. However, the proposal was disputed by members within the party, like the second deputy leader Bent Høie, who stated that there was still a need for a separate representative body for Norway's Sámi people.

This was the first election for Sámi in the South, which had previously ran as Sámi Settled in Southern Norway. The party targeted the Sámi diaspora, but was oriented towards urban Sámi living in Oslo.

=== Lists ===
The seven electoral constituencies of the Sámi parliament

A total of fifteen parties submitted lists in order to run in the 2013 election. Of the major parties, only two parties ran a full slate of candidates across the seven constituencies, the Labor Party and the NSR. The Conservative, Progress, and Center Parties ran lists in six constituencies. Arja ran in five constituencies. Nordkalottfolket ran in two constituencies.

| Constituency: | 1. Østre | 2. Ávjovárri | 3. Nordre | 4. Gáisi | 5. Vesthavet | 6. Sørsamisk | 7. Sør-Norge | Total |
|---|---|---|---|---|---|---|---|---|
| Arbeiderpartiet | x | x | x | x | x | x | x | 7 |
| Árja | x | x | x | x | | | x | 5 |
| Fastboendes liste | | x | | | | | | 1 |
| Fremskrittspartiet | x | x | x | x | x | | x | 6 |
| Høyre | x | x | x | x | x | | x | 6 |
| Flyttsamelista | | x | | | | | | 1 |
| Kristelig Folkeparti | | x | | | | | | 1 |
| Nordkalottfolket | | | x | | | | x | 2 |
| Norske Samers Riksforbund | y | x | x | x | x | x | x | 7 |
| Næring og natur | | x | | | | | | 1 |
| Samefolkets parti | y | x | | | | | x | 3 |
| Samer sørpå | | | | | | | x | 1 |
| Senterpartiet | x | x | x | x | x | x | | 6 |
| Venstre | | x | | | | | | 1 |
| Åarjel-Saemiej Gielh | | | | | | x | | 1 |
| Total | 6 | 12 | 7 | 6 | 5 | 4 | 8 | 48 |

== Debates ==
2013 Norwegian Sámi election debates
| Date | Time | Organizers | P Present I Invitee N Non-invitee | | | | | | |
| Date | Time | Organizers | NSR | Ap | Árja | Frp | Sp | H | Refs |
|---|---|---|---|---|---|---|---|---|---|
| 5 Sep | 19:45 | NRK | P Aili Keskitalo | P Vibeke Larsen | P Laila Susanne Vars | N | P Helge Guttormsen | N | |

== Results ==
| Party | Votes | % | Seats | +/– |
|---|---|---|---|---|
| Norwegian Sámi Association | 2,397 | 24.17 | 11 | 0 |
| Labour Party | 2,093 | 21.10 | 10 | –4 |
| Árja | 1,145 | 11.54 | 4 | +1 |
| Progress Party | 888 | 8.95 | 2 | –1 |
| Conservative Party | 696 | 7.02 | 2 | +1 |
| Centre Party | 471 | 4.75 | 0 | 0 |
| NSR–SáB | 465 | 4.69 | 2 | – |
| Nordkalottfolket | 431 | 4.35 | 3 | +2 |
| Ávjovári Moving Sámi List | 331 | 3.34 | 1 | –1 |
| Kautokeino Residents List | 264 | 2.66 | 1 | +1 |
| Åarjel-Saemiej Gïelh | 205 | 2.07 | 2 | +1 |
| Sámi People's Party | 184 | 1.86 | 0 | 0 |
| Nutrition and Nature | 132 | 1.33 | 0 | New |
| Sámi in the South | 122 | 1.23 | 1 | New |
| Liberal Party | 50 | 0.50 | 0 | 0 |
| Christian Democratic Party | 45 | 0.45 | 0 | 0 |
| Total | 9,919 | 100.00 | 39 | 0 |
| Valid votes | 9,919 | 98.43 | | |
| Invalid/blank votes | 158 | 1.57 | | |
| Total votes | 10,077 | 100.00 | | |
| Registered voters/turnout | 15,005 | 67.16 | | |
Source: Valgresultat.no

== Aftermath ==
The 2013 election resulted in a hung parliament, with neither the Labour Party nor the Norwegian Sámi Association reaching a majority coalition. It was eventually decided that Aili Keskitalo would be the next president of the Sámi Parliament with a minority government. Keskitalo would win against Laila Susanne Vars from Árja, who was supported by her party, Nordkalottfolket, and Kautokeino Residents List. The first round was won by Keskitalo 29 votes to 10, with Vars subsequently stating that Árja would support Keskitalo in the second round. Keskitalo would later be ousted in December 2016 in favor of a coalition between the Labour Party, the Conservatives, and Arja, with Vibeke Larsen as president.
