= List of political parties in Norway =

This article lists political parties in Norway.

Norway has a multi-party system with numerous political parties, in which no party can easily gain a majority of the 169 legislative seats. Parties may cooperate to form coalition governments.

== History ==
=== 1884–1905 ===
The oldest political party in Norway is the Liberal Party, which was formed in 1884. Shortly afterwards, the Conservative Party was formed in opposition. The main political cleavage at the time was the issue of parliamentarism, with Liberals in favor and Conservatives in opposition. Until 1903, Norway was, for all intents and purposes, a two-party system; the smaller Moderate Liberal Party joined the Conservatives in a de facto permanent electoral coalition from the 1891 election.

=== 1905–1945 ===
During the first years of the 20th century, major electoral shifts took place. In 1903, the leftist Labour Party gained its first five MPs, after having captured 10% of the national vote. For the 1921 elections, the former two-round, single-member district system was replaced with proportional representation, allowing for further gains for medium-sized parties such as Labour and the Farmers' Party, which had been formed the previous year. In 1927, Labour surged to first place nationally, a position it has held in every single election since then. In 1928, they formed their first government, ending the decades-long power-alteration between Liberals and Conservatives. This government, headed by Christopher Hornsrud, was short-lived, however; it lasted a mere 18 days. The Farmers' Party followed suit, sitting in government briefly from 1931 to 1933, under Peder Kolstad and Jens Hundseid. Despite the surge of previously minor parties, the Liberals and Conservatives retained significance, with Johan Ludwig Mowinckel (1933–1935) serving as the last Liberal prime minister to date. With the onset of World War II, Johan Nygaardsvold from the Labour Party served as de jure prime minister for a decade, from 1935 to 1945.

During the Nazi occupation of Norway, political opposition to the collaborationist regime of Vidkun Quisling and the Nasjonal Samling party was silenced and prosecuted; Nygaardsvold's cabinet went into exile in London in 1940, and did not return before 1945.

=== 1945–2001 ===
From the first post-war elections in 1945 until the 1961 elections, the Labour Party held an absolute majority in parliament, with its Einar Gerhardsen serving as prime minister for, in total, 17 years and 17 days. For most of this period, Norway was generally regarded as a dominant-party system, with the divided opposition, consisting of Liberals, Conservatives, Centrists, Christian Democrats and occasionally Communists, unable to match Labour. It was first in 1963, in the aftermath of the Kings Bay Affair, that the Conservative John Lyng was able to take power with support from the other non-socialist groups. With the gradual decline of the Labour Party, opposition figures such as Per Borten (Centrist), Lars Korvald (Christian Democrat) and Kåre Willoch served as prime ministers at various points during the latter half of the 20th century. 1973 saw the advent of anti-establishment parties such as Anders Lange's Party and the Socialist Electoral League, which would later become the right-wing Progress Party and Socialist Left, respectively. Both of these groups remained relatively isolated on the political scene for the subsequent decades; the Socialist Left did not enter government before 2005, while the Progress Party was not included in a centre-right pact before in 2013.

=== 2001–present day ===
The parliamentary election in 2001 saw the collapse of the Labour Party's traditionally constantly large lead over non-socialist parties; they took a mere 24% of votes – a loss of 11 points – against 21% for the Conservatives of Jan Petersen. The short-lived Cabinet Stoltenberg I, a Labour government in office since 2000, stepped down in favor of a centre-right coalition of Liberals, Conservatives and Christian Democrats, led by the latter's Kjell Magne Bondevik. Following the 2005 election, the centre-left Red-Green Coalition won a majority in parliament, with Jens Stoltenberg returning as prime minister, and serving until 2013.

The 2013 election provided the bloc of the Conservative Erna Solberg a clear parliamentary majority, with 96 of the 169 seats in parliament. She formed a government with the Progress Party of Siv Jensen, breaking the latter's decades-long isolation from the other centre-right parties. Four years later, the centre-right parties managed to retain the majority in parliament with 88 of the 169 seats. Solberg continued to serve as prime minister, with different combinations of government coalition partners, all four parties at some time were part of Solberg Cabinet. In the most recent election of 2021, the result swung in strong favour of the centre-left parties who gathered 100 of 169 seats in the Storting. This led to a new government with Jonas Gahr Støre as prime minister, consisting of the Labour party and the Centre party.

== Political parties ==
=== Parties currently in Parliament ===

Party		Est.	Ideology	Position	Leader	Affiliation		2025 parliamentary election		2023 local elections		
Party		Est.	Ideology	Position	Leader	Int'l	EU	MPs	Vote share	Municipal councils	County councils	Vote share
Ap	Labour Party; Arbeiderpartiet	1887	Social democracy	Centre-left	Jonas Gahr Støre	PA	PES	53 / 169	28.2%	2,023 / 7,791	153 / 664	21.7%
FrP	Progress Party; Fremskrittspartiet	1973	Right-wing populism	Right-wing to far-right	Sylvi Listhaug	—N/a	—N/a	48 / 169	23.9%	948 / 7,791	87 / 664	11.4%
H	Conservative Party; Høyre	1884	Liberal conservatism	Centre-right	Ine Eriksen Søreide	IDU	EPP	24 / 169	14.6%	1,717 / 7,791	163 / 664	25.9%
Sp	Centre Party; Senterpartiet	1920	Nordic agrarianism	Centre	Trygve Slagsvold Vedum	—N/a	—N/a	9 / 169	5.6%	1,274 / 7,791	61 / 664	8.2%
SV	Socialist Left Party; Sosialistisk Venstreparti	1975	Democratic socialism	Left-wing	Kirsti Bergstø	—N/a	NGLA	9 / 169	5.5%	484 / 7,791	43 / 664	6.8%
R	Red Party; Rødt	2007	Socialism	Left-wing to far-left	Marie Sneve Martinussen	—N/a	—N/a	9 / 169	5.3%	192 / 7,791	25 / 664	3.5%
MDG	Green Party; Miljøpartiet De Grønne	1988	Green politics	Centre-left	Arild Hermstad	GG	EGP	7 / 169	4.7%	157 / 7,791	24 / 664	4.1%
KrF	Christian Democratic Party; Kristelig Folkeparti	1933	Christian democracy	Centre-right	Dag Inge Ulstein	—N/a	EPP	7 / 169	4.2%	359 / 7,791	29 / 664	4.0%
V	Liberal Party; Venstre	1884	Social liberalism	Centre	Guri Melby	LI	ALDE	3 / 169	3.6%	280 / 7,791	26 / 664	5.0%

=== Parties currently in the Sámi Parliament of Norway ===
Party	Founded	Associated ideology	Current leader	International affiliation	Vote share (2025)	2025 MPs
Norwegian Sámi Association; Norske Sámers Riksforbund	1968	Sámi interests	Silje Karine Muotka	—N/a	38.01%	18 / 39
North Calotte People; Nordkalottfolket	2005	Populism	Toril Bakken Kåven	—N/a	31.89%	15 / 39
Labour Party; Arbeiderpartiet	1887	Social democracy	Ronny Wilhelmsen	PA	11.37%	4 / 39
Sámi People's Party; Samefolkets Parti	1999	Sámi interests	Birger Randulf Nymo	—N/a	4.79%	1 / 39
Ávjovári Moving Sámi List; Ávjovári Flyttsameliste	1999	Moving Sámi interests	Berit Marie Eira	—N/a	2.38%	1 / 39

=== Non-parliamentary parties with elected local representatives ===
Party	Founded	Associated ideology	Current leader	International affiliation	2021 election vote share	2023 election vote share	2023 municipal council members	2023 county council members
Industry and Business Party; Industri og Næringspartiet	2020	Right-wing politics	Lars Husby	None	0.34%	3.06%	241 / 7,791	30 / 664
Pensioners' Party; Pensjonistpartiet	1985	Pensioners' interests	Olav Halvor Megård	None	0.64%	1.50%	84 / 7,791	9 / 664
Norway Democrats; Norgesdemokratene	2002	National conservatism	Anne Cecilie Kristensen	None	1.14%	0.50%	10 / 7,791	0 / 664
Conservative; Konservativt	2011	Christian right	Erik Selle	None	0.35%	0.47%	14 / 7,791	1 / 664
The Centre; Partiet Sentrum	2020	Centrism	Elisabeth Meling	None	0.26%	0.42%	7 / 7,791	0 / 664
Coastal Party; Kystpartiet	1999	Northern regionalism	Kathy Fjellstad	None	0.01%	0.02%	1 / 7,791	0 / 664

=== Non-parliamentary parties with no elected representation ===
Party	Founded	Associated ideology	Current leader	International affiliation	2021 election vote share
Welfare and Innovation Party; Velferd og Innovasjonspartiet	2016	Health politics	Lise Askvik	—N/a	0.22%
The Liberals; Liberalistene	2014	Classical liberalism	Arnt Rune Flekstad	IALP	0.15%
People's Party FNB; Folkets Parti FNB	2014	Single-issue politics	Cecilie Lyngby	—N/a	0.12%
Alliance – Alternative for Norway; Alliansen – Alternativ for Norge	2016	Alt-right	Hans Jørgen Lysglimt Johansen	None	0.08%
Pirate Party; Piratpartiet	2012	Pirate politics	Svein Mork Dahl	PPI, PPEU	0.08%
Communist Party of Norway; Norges Kommunistiske Parti	1923	Marxism–Leninism	Runa Evensen	IMCWP	0.01%
Feminist Initiative; Feministisk Initiativ	2015	Radical feminism	Cathrine Linn Kristiansen, Sunniva Schultze-Florey	—N/a	0.01%
Generation Party; Generasjonspartiet	2020	Holism	Gyda Oddekalv	—N/a	0.01%
Save Nature; Redd Naturen	2020	Anti-wind power	Petter Johan Holt	—N/a	0.00%
Árja; Innsatsvilje (Commitment)	2008	Traditionalism	Láilá Susanne Vars	—N/a	5.33%
People's Federation of the Saami; Sámenes Folkeforbund	1993	Sámi interests	Liv Olaug Slettli	—N/a	1.45%
Value Party; Verdipartiet	2016	Christian conservatism	Kjartan Mogen	—N/a	0
Norway Party; Norgespartiet	2007	Direct democracy	—N/a	—N/a	0
Society Party; Samfunnspartiet	1985	Anarchism	Bjørn Dahl	—N/a	0
Northern Assembly; Nordting	2014	Northern regionalism	Amund Sjølie Sveen	—N/a	0
Serve the People – Communist League; Tjen Folket – Kommunistisk Forbund	1998	Marxism–Leninism–Maoism	—N/a	—N/a	0
DNI Party; Partiet DNI	2024	Populism	Owe Ingemann Waltherzøe	—N/a	
Loneliness Party; Ensomhetspartiet	2024	Loneliness prevention	Else Kåss Furuseth	—N/a	
Peace and Justice; Fred og Rettferdighet	2024	Russophilia	Marielle Leraand	—N/a	

=== Defunct parties ===
==== Major/parliamentary parties ====
- Centre (Centrum) (1893–1903)
- Coalition Party (Samlingspartiet) (1903–09)
- Free-minded Liberal Party (Frisinnede Venstre) (1909–45)
- Future for Finnmark (Framtid for Finnmark) (1989–93)
- Labour Democrats/Radical People's Party (Arbeiderdemokratene/Radikale Folkeparti) (1906–36)
- Liberal People's Party (Det Liberale Folkepartiet) (1972–88)
- Liberal People's Party (Det Liberale Folkepartiet) (1992–2017)
- Moderate Liberal Party (Moderate Venstre) (1888–1906)
- Nasjonal Samling (1933–45), collaborationist party, only legal party 1940–45, banned
- Red Electoral Alliance (Rød Valgallianse) (1973–2007)
- Social Democratic Labour Party of Norway (Norges Socialdemokratiske Arbeiderparti) (1921–27)
- Socialist People's Party (Sosialistisk Folkeparti) (1961–76)
- Society Party (Samfundspartiet) (1932–49)

==== Minor parties ====
- National Socialist Workers' Party of Norway (Norges Nasjonalsocialistiske Arbeiderparti) (1930–40), extraparliamentary
- Fatherland League (Fedrelandslaget) (1933–40 as political party)
- Democratic Party of Norway (Norges Demokratiske Parti) (1965–c.1979)
- Democratic Socialists (Demokratiske Sosialister) (1973–1976)
- Workers' Communist Party (Arbeidernes Kommunistparti) (1973–2007), extraparliamentary
- Reform Party (Reformpartiet) (1974–75)
- Norwegian Front/National People's Party (Norsk Front/Nasjonalt Folkeparti) (1975–91), extraparliamentary
- Stop Immigration (Stopp Innvandringen) (1987–95), Anti-immigration
- Christian Conservative Party (Kristent Konservativt Parti) (1989–98)
- National Democrats (Nasjonaldemokratene) (1990–c.1991), Anti-immigration
- Fatherland Party (Fedrelandspartiet) (1990–2008), county representation, Euroscepticism, Anti-immigration
- Natural Law Party (Naturlovpartiet) (1993, last active 2001)
- New Future Coalition Party (Samlingspartiet Ny Fremtid) (1993–98)
- White Electoral Alliance (Hvit Valgallianse) (1995–97), Anti-immigration
- Non-Partisan Deputies (Tverrpolitisk folkevalgte) (1997, last active 2009)
- Norwegian People's Party (Norsk Folkeparti) (1999, last active 2003), Anti-immigration
- National Alliance (1999–2006), Anti-immigration
- The Political Party (Det Politiske Parti) (2001)
- Reform Party (Reformpartiet) (2004–09)
- Abortion Opponents' List (Abortmotstandernes Liste) (c. 2005, last active 2009)
- Norwegian Patriots (2007–08), Anti-immigration
- Vigrid (2008–09 as political party)

== See also ==
- List of political parties by country
- Parliament of Norway
- Politics of Norway
