= 2021 Norwegian Sámi parliamentary election =

Election for the Sámi Parliament

- 13 September 2021
- All 39 seats in the Sámi Parliament; 20 seats needed for a majority
- Turnout: 68.78%
Party	Leader	Vote %	Seats	+/–
NSR	Silje Karine Muotka	31.91	17	−1
NKF	Toril Bakken Kåven	18.28	9	+6
Labour	Ronny Wilhelmsen	15.04	7	−2
Centre	Svein O. Leiros	9.59	3	+1
SáB	Birger Nymo	5.58	1	−1
Progress	Arthur Tørfoss	4.77	1	0
Moving Sámi List	Berit Marie Eira	2.38	1	0
This lists parties that won seats. See the complete results below.

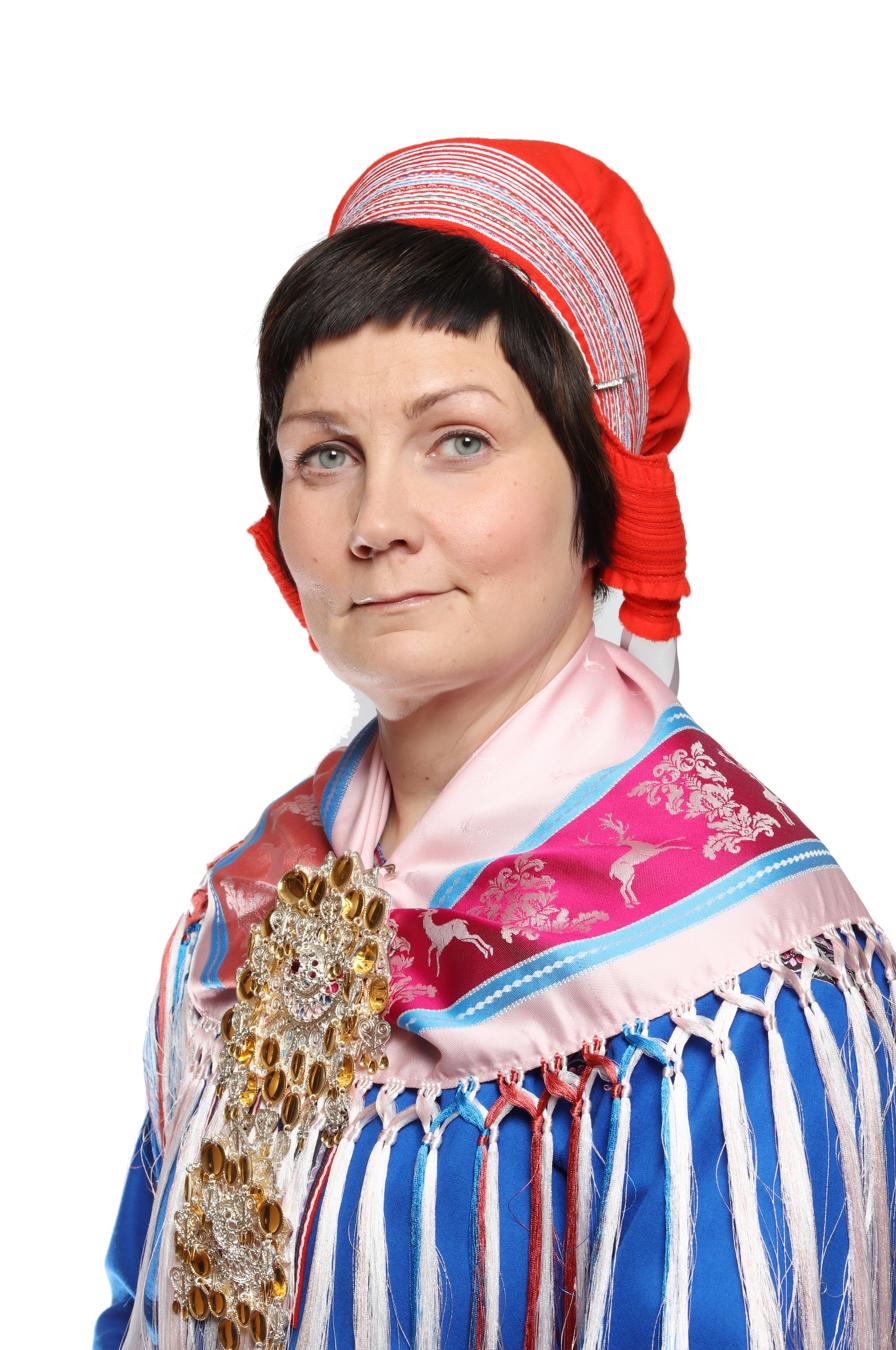

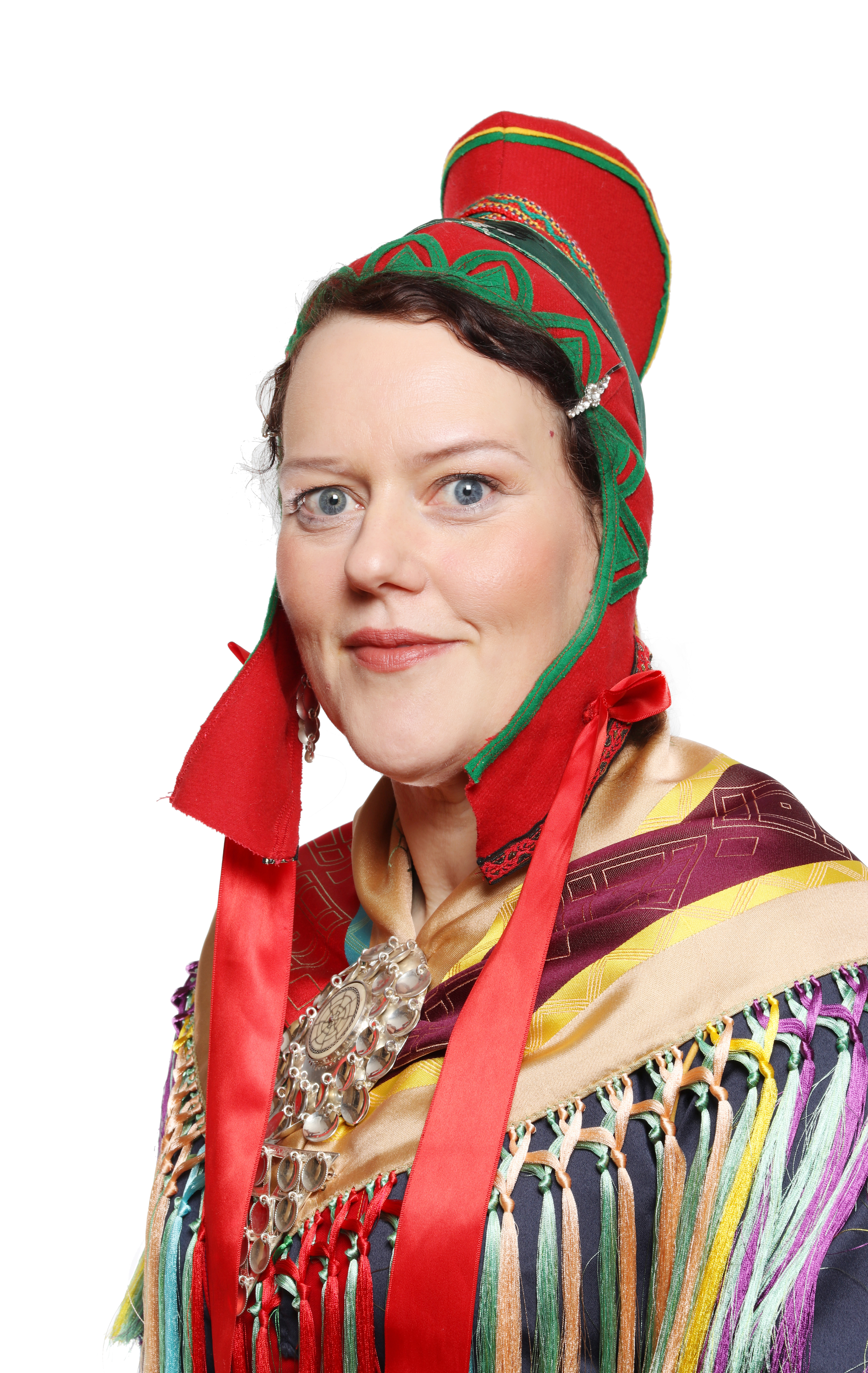
President of the Sámi Parliament before	President of the Sámi Parliament after
Aili Keskitalo; NSR	Silje Karine Muotka; NSR

The 2021 Norwegian Sámi parliamentary election was held on 13 September 2021. All 39 seats in the Norwegian Sámi legislature, the Sámediggi, were up for election.

== Background ==
=== Previous election ===
In the previous election, held on 11 September 2017, the Norwegian Sámi Association, with former President of the Sámi Parliament Aili Keskitalo as their presidential candidate, won a plurality, with 18 of the 39 seats, including 2 on a joint list with the Sami People's Party. On 9 October, the Norwegian Sámi Association formed a coalition on the Governing Council with the Centre Party, Ávjovári Moving Sámi List and Åarjel-Saemiej Gielh, together controlling 22 seats in the Sámi Parliament. Keskitalo took office as president on 12 October after being elected by the Parliament. The Labour Party, which had governed from 2016, returned to the opposition. Other opposition parties included Nordkalottfolket, Progress Party, Guovdageainnu Residents List, Conservative Party, Sami People's Party, and Árja.

=== Presidential candidates ===
In June 2020, Aili Keskitalo announced that she would not be running for re-election as president. The Norwegian Sámi Association nominated Silje Karine Muotka, the incumbent Councillor of Environment, Industry, and Developmental Issues on the Governing Council, as their candidate. The Labour Party nominated Ronny Wilhelmsen, their presidential candidate in 2017. The Nordkalottfolket nominated their leader, Toril Bakken Kåven.

== Electoral system ==
The election used party-list proportional representation in 7 multi-member constituencies. Each constituency is given a minimum of 2 seats. The apportionment of the remaining 25 seats is based on the number of voters on the Sámi electoral roll on 30 June on the year of the last local elections in 2019, and allocated using the Sainte-Laguë method. Unlike elections to Storting, there are no levelling seats.

Constituency	Seats	
Constituency	2017	2021
Østre	5	5
Ávjovári	8	7 ▼
Nordre	6	6
Gáisi	5	6 ▲
Vesthavet	5	5
Sørsamisk	4	4
Sør-Norge	6	6
Norway	39	

Voters aged 18 or over, and registered on the Sámi electoral roll prior to 30 June 2021, were entitled to vote in the Sámi Parliament election. To register, a voter must declare that they identify as Sámi, and that they either have Sámi as their mother tongue, have a Sámi parent, grandparent or great-grandparent, or are the child of a person already on the electoral roll. Sámi people from Sweden, Finland or Russia must be registered in Norway for the past three years in order to register.

Advance voting was available from 10 August to 10 September (1 July for voters abroad or in Svalbard or Jan Mayen), and required for voters in municipalities with fewer than 30 people on the Sámi electoral roll. In total, 8,340 votes, 40.6% of the total, were advance votes.

== Debates ==
2021 Norwegian Sámi election debates
Date	Time	Organizers	P Present I Invitee N Non-invitee						
Date	Time	Organizers	NSR	Ap	NKF	Sp	Frp	H	Refs
20 June	11:04	NRK	P Silje Karine Muotka	P Ronny Wilhelmsen	N	N	N	N	
28 June	20:00	NRK	P Beaska Niillas	N	P Aina Madelén Nordsletta Aslaksen	N	N	N	
18 aug	19:49	NRK	P Silje Karine Muotka	P Sigurd Kvammen Rafaelsen	N	P Siv Mossleth	N	P Marianne Haukland	
19 aug	22:05	NRK	P Silje Karine Muotka	P Ronny Wilhelmsen	I	I	I	I	
10 Sep	12:10	NRK	P Silje Karine Muotka	P Ronny Wilhelmsen	P Toril Bakken	N	N	N	

== Results ==
Party	Votes	%	Seats	+/–
Norwegian Sámi Association	4,414	31.91	17	–1
Nordkalottfolket	2,529	18.28	9	+6
Labour Party	2,081	15.04	7	–2
Centre Party	1,326	9.59	3	+1
Sámi People's Party	772	5.58	1	0
Árja	738	5.33	0	–1
Progress Party	660	4.77	1	0
Conservative Party	596	4.31	0	–1
Ávjovári Moving Sámi List	329	2.38	1	0
People's Federation of the Saami	200	1.45	0	0
Ávjovári Residents List	189	1.37	0	New
Total	13,834	100.00	39	0
Valid votes	13,834	97.91		
Invalid/blank votes	296	2.09		
Total votes	14,130	100.00		
Registered voters/turnout	20,543	68.78		
Source: valgresultat.no

=== By constituency ===
==== Vote share ====
Constituency	NSR	NKF	Ap	Sp	SáB	FrP	JSL
Østre	25.9	13.9	22.6	12.5	4.2	4.0	–
Ávjovári	25.0	17.5	9.9	11.6	6.6	1.8	11.5
Nordre	20.7	36.5	14.8	7.4	3.5	9.7	–
Gáisi	37.6	17.1	13.5	9.5	3.4	6.5	–
Vesthavet	41.6	12.5	13.6	11.4	4.7	3.5	–
Sørsamisk	53.7	9.5	20.7	8.1	–	3.1	–
Sør-Norge	35.3	14.7	15.2	6.6	11.5	4.8	–

==== Number of seats ====
Constituency	NSR	NKF	Ap	Sp	SáB	FrP	JSL
Østre	2	1	1	1	–	–	–
Ávjovári	2	2	1	1	–	–	1
Nordre	1	3	1	–	–	1	–
Gáisi	3	1	1	1	–	–	–
Vesthavet	3	1	1	–	–	–	–
Sørsamisk	3	–	1	–	–	–	–
Sør-Norge	3	1	1	–	1	–	–

== Aftermath ==
The Norwegian Sámi Association presidential candidate Silje Karine Muotka declared victory on the night of the election. Muotka stated that renewal of the Muohtačalbmi coalition with the Centre Party and Ávjovári Moving Sámi List was her preference for government formation.

On 12 October, the Norwegian Sámi Association, Centre Party and Ávjovári Moving Sámi List announced that they had reached an agreement to continue cooperating within the Sámi Parliament. On 18 October, the cooperation agreement, named the Beaiveálgu Declaration after the first Sámi-language novel, was presented. Silje Karine Muotka named her Governing Council, consisting of the Norwegian Sámi Association, with one Centre Party member. Muotka was elected President of the Sámi Parliament on 21 October.

== See also ==
- 2021 Norwegian parliamentary election
