= Gerd Fleischer =

Norwegian human rights defender

Gerd Fleischer (born 17 September 1942) is a Norwegian human rights defender. Her activism stems from her experience as a war child, with a Norwegian-Sami mother and a German father. Fleischer is the leader of Selvhjelp for innvandrere og flyktninger ("Self-Help for Immigrants and Refugees"; SEIF). She is the recipient of the Jenteprisen (2014).

== Biography ==
Gerd Elinor Fleischer was born in a small town in northern Norway on 17 September 1942 and was raised in Tromsø. Her mother is Norwegian-Sami and her father is German. As a child, Fleischer was subjected to discrimination, violence and persecution by the local community and the Norwegian state. After being beaten, bullied, and called a "German whore", she escaped from home at the age of thirteen because of domestic abuse, living a lonely life, hungry and homeless. Four year later, she left Norway and went into exile. During this time, she found her father in Germany, although at first, he denied knowing Fleischer or her mother. After eighteen years, most of the time in Mexico City, she returned to Norway, determined to fight for justice for the children of war, as well as other victims of discrimination and persecution. She has participated in the war children's lawsuit against the Norwegian state at the European Court of Human Rights in 2007. Prior to the 2009 Norwegian Sámi parliamentary election, she was the second candidate for the Sámi People's Party in the Southern Norway constituency.

Fleischer fostered two street children from Mexico. She is featured in the documentary "De uønskede" ("The Unwanted").

== Awards ==
- 2014, Jenteprisen
