= Bygdeliste =

Type of electoral list in Norway

A bygdeliste (also fellesliste or lokal liste) is a type of electoral list for the system of party-list proportional representation in Norway. It is a list of political candidates that are running for a local office without being part of a national political party. Normally in Norwegian politics, each party puts forth a list of candidates for an election and the percent of the vote that the party receives will translate into that percentage of the candidates from the list being elected. In the 2015 election, about 5% of the local representatives in Norway were elected from a bygdeliste and there are 16 municipalities that elected a mayor from a bygdeliste.

A bygdeliste is a group of candidates who have banded together without a party, often for a local cause or situation such as to prevent a school closure or a municipal merger. The bygdeliste is essentially a very small local party that exists outside the normal parties. The word bygdeliste literally means "village list" in the Norwegian language. Alternate names in Norwegian include fellesliste ("community list") or lokale liste ("local list").

In order for the bygdeliste to be on the ballot for municipal elections, the group must get signatures of at least 2% of the voting population or 300 people, whichever is smaller. Bygdeliste candidates do not receive state funding like regular political parties in Norway do.
