= Reform Party (Norway) =

Norwegian political party

The Reform Party (Norwegian: Reformpartiet) was a Norwegian political party. It was founded on 12 October 2004 and was a candidate for the 2005 Storting election in six counties: Akershus, Møre og Romsdal, Oppland, Rogaland, Vestfold and Østfold. It received 727 votes (0.03%).

It was founded as a party in opposition to the toll plaza around Tønsberg, and had as its main issue opposition to user financing of highway construction in Norway. The party was disestablished on 13 July 2009.
