= Johan Mikkel Sara =

Sami politician

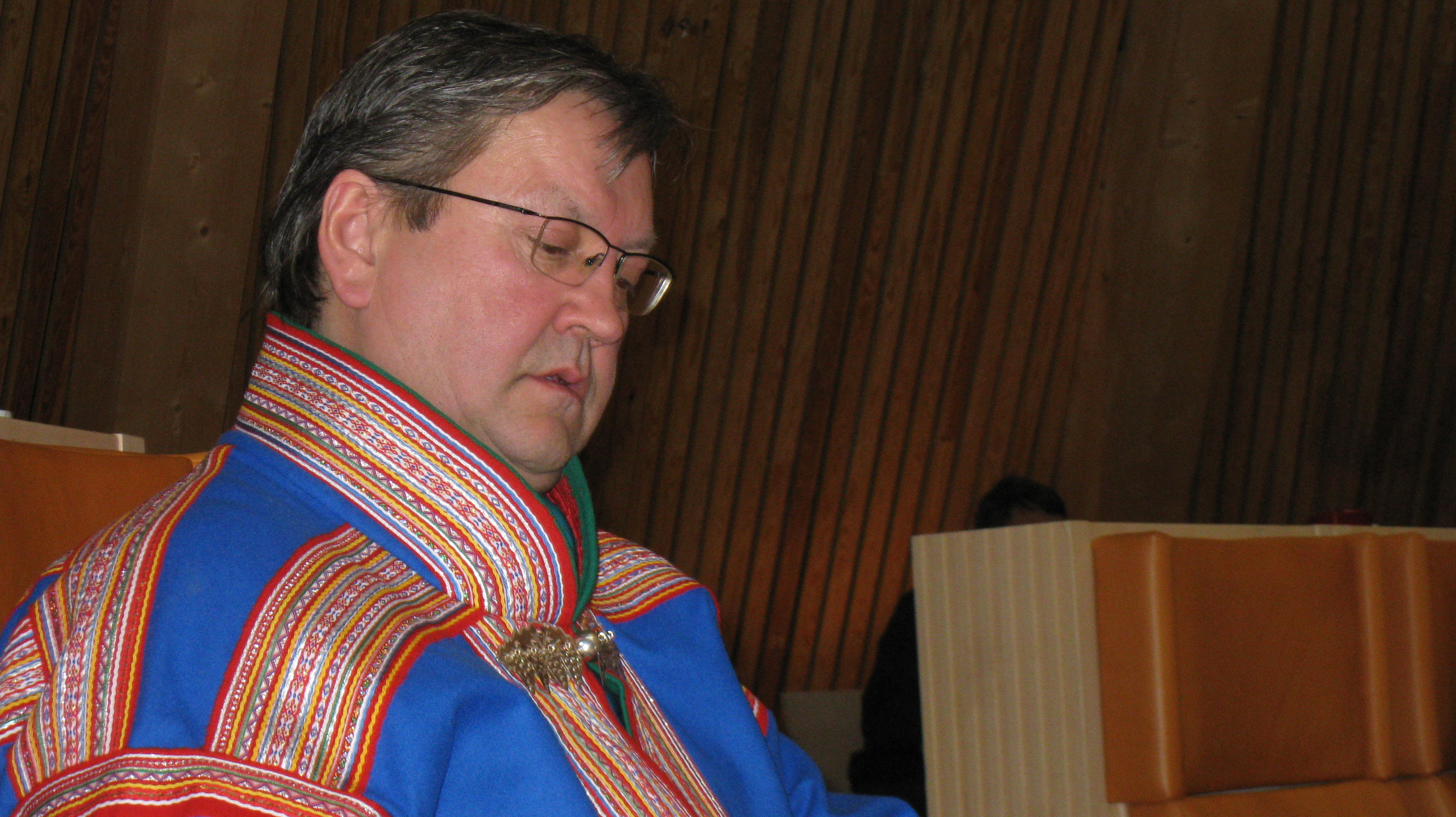
Johan Mikkel Sara

Johan Mikkel Sara (born 1953) is a Sami politician. He represents Sami who are living in southern Norway at the Sami Parliament, where he was vice president from 2005 to 26 September 2007. Sara was one of the so-called "Gang of Four" who went between the Norwegian Saami Association (NSR) and the Labour Party, and that by virtue of this bargaining position had prominent positions in the Sami parliament, until his break with NSR in 2007.
