= Árja =

Commitment Árja
- Leader: Láilá Susanne Vars
- Founded: 25 May 2008
- Ideology: Indigenous rights Traditionalism
- Political position: Centre

Website
- Árja.no

Árja ("Commitment" in northern Sami) is a Norwegian Sami political party. The party was founded on 24 May 2008 in Jergul, and its leader is Láilá Susanne Vars. The ideology of the party is claimed to be based on respect for the elderly in society and traditionally based education. Otherwise, the party wants a more open and available Sami Parliament, criticises the Sami Parliament for neglecting traditionally Sami values and society, and thus wants to strengthen the rights for the rural and coastal population.

The party put up lists in five out of seven constituencies, and ran for its first Sami parliamentary election in 2009 where it immediately broke through as the third largest party, with 10% of the votes and three parliamentary representatives.

Singer Fred Buljo is associated with Árja; he represented the party between 2013 and 2017.

== Electoral history ==
Sámediggi
Date	Votes			Seats		Position	Size
Date	#	%	± pp	#	±	Position	Size
2009	949	10.0	New	3 / 39	New	Coalition (Ap–Árja–NKF–ÅAsG–SSN)	3rd
2013	1,145	11.5	▲1.5	4 / 39	▲1	Opposition (2013–16)	3rd
2013	1,145	11.5	▲1.5	4 / 39	▲1	Coalition (2016–17, Ap-H-Árja)	3rd
2017	911	7.8	▼3.7	1 / 39	▼2	Opposition	3rd
2021	738	5.3	▼2.5	0 / 39	▼1	Extra-parliamentary	▼6th
