= North Calotte =

Region in Northern Europe

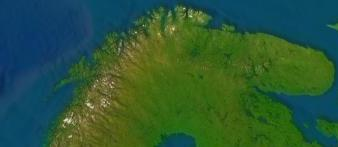
The area of Nordkalotten

North Calotte (Nordkalotten in Norwegian and Swedish, or Pohjoiskalotti in Finnish), also known as the Cap of the North, comprises the regions of Norway, Sweden, and Finland located north of the Arctic Circle. It is usually considered to consist of the counties Finnmark, Nordland and Troms in Norway, Norrbotten in Sweden, and Lapland in Finland. The Kola Peninsula of Russia is also sometimes included, although the nascent Soviet Union had closed its border.

The region contains over 30% of the total area of the three countries, but it houses less than 5% of their population. The region has a subarctic climate and is home to the majority of the Sámi people.

NATO forces conduct their intensive Arctic warfare training exercises there.

== See also ==
- Nordkalottfolket
