= Nordkalottfolket =

North Calotte People Nordkalottfolket
- Abbreviation: NKF
- Leader: Vibeke Larsen
- Founded: 2005
- Ideology: Populism; Multiculturalism; Sámi interests Kven interests Norwegian interests
- Sámi Parliament: 15 / 39
- Finnmark County Council: 7 / 35
- Troms County Council: 1 / 37

Website
- https://nordkalottfolket.no/

Nordkalottfolket (lit. 'North Calotte People', NKF) is a Sámi political party in Norway. It was first established in 2005 and contested the 2005 election as the Finnmark List (Norwegian: Finnmarkslista), but was renamed in 2009 to its current name. The NKF has been led by Vibeke Larsen since 2024.

The party advocates for a multicultural and egalitarian approach towards the peoples of the north, including the Sámi, Kven, and Norwegian people. The NKF states that it wishes for equal opportunity for all Northern people on the Cap of the North (Norwegian: Nordkalotten). This position informs its stances on local issues such as land and water rights, reindeer husbandry, and the outfield industry. Its approach has been described as populist and its rhetoric has been compared to that of the Progress Party.

As of 2024, Nordkalottfolket is the largest opposition party in the Sámi Parliament.

== History ==
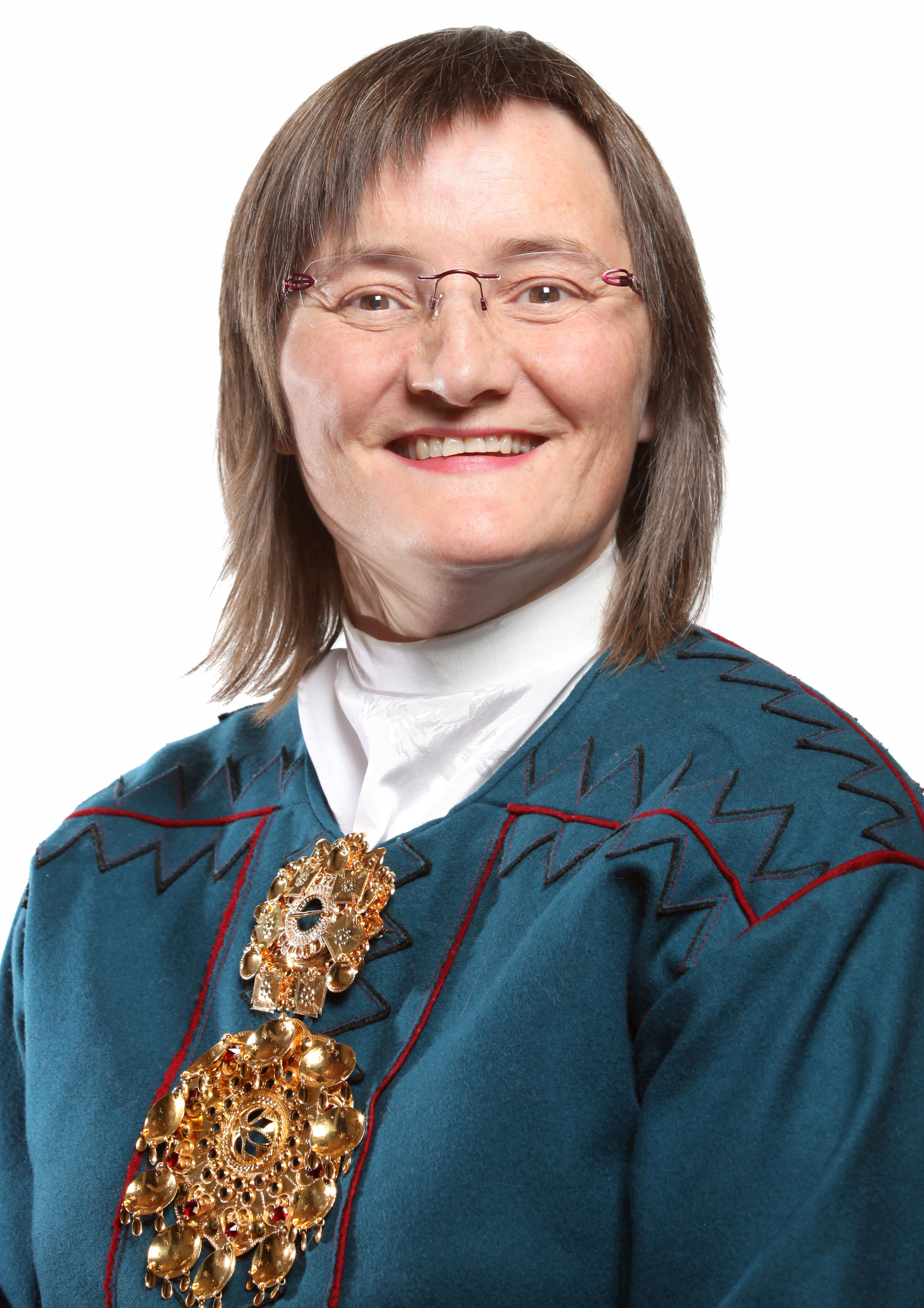
Toril Bakken Kåven led the party from 2005 to 2022.

The party originally was named the "Finnmark List" (Finnmarkslista), a name which was decided upon in the last minute prior to running in the 2005 Norwegian Sámi parliamentary election. The party was eventually renamed in 2009 as Nordkalottfolket by Toril Bakken Kåven who considered the name "beautiful" and reflective of the common history and the multiple ethnic groups living in the Cap of the North. In addition to preventing confusion, as the party did not run in solely the region of Finnmark anymore.

The party received its highest share of vote during the 2021 Norwegian Sámi parliamentary election, becoming the second largest party in the Sámi parliament. Despite their increased result, the party was unable to find viable coalition partners and thus went into opposition. Analysts cited the mobilization of the party's voters in select electoral districts as contributing to the party's win.

Toril Bakken Kåven announced her intention to stand down as leader in May 2022. Arne Kristian Vestre was elected her successor at the national meeting of the party on 12 June 2022. Vibeke Larsen was elected as the party's new leader in 2024. She had previously served as president of the Sámi Parliament of Norway in 2016 and 2017 as a member of the Labour Party and later as an independent.

== Ideology ==
The party describes itself as having a "want to safeguard culture, industry, and society". The party cites the communal nature of living, interaction, relation, and land use in the north as its reasoning. Rolf Edmund Lund described the party's policies as pragmatic with regards to issues of the outfield industry, rights to land and water, coastal Sámi interests, individuals who cannot speak Sámi due to assmiliation, and equality with a focus on the Kven people. In addition to describing the party's rhetoric as populist, the party is described as advocating for positive discrimination.

The party contrasts with the Norwegian Sámi Association by being on the party's ideological right. It has been compared with the Progress Party in both its rhetoric and attitudes. It has been described as "building lines of conflict between Sámi who speak Sámi and especially against the reindeer husbandry industry". The party has been formerly criticized for describing Sámi-speakers as "pigs".

The party supports all support and assistance towards the country of Ukraine during the 2022 Russian invasion of Ukraine. The party urged Norwegian authorities to cease all cooperation with Russia and impose sanctions as long as the war was ongoing. The party cited the north's increased potential risk of invasion by Russia.

=== Indigenous and minority rights ===
Toril Bakken Kåven stated that the party "[stands] firm on Sámi rights and indigenous peoples' rights" but that there was a need for responsible management of those rights. She stated that there should be freedom for deviation in order to create progress for their respective groups. The party objects to the concept of Free, prior and informed consent as the basis for northern policy. The party additionally advocates for the right for individuals to self-identify as Sámi with the party advocating for reintegration of individuals whose families were forcibly assimilated into Norwegian society and whose families no longer identify as Sámi.

The party is critical of demands to use Sámi languages as a condition to participate in Sámi politics, citing the Norwegianization policy which left many Sámi unable to speak their native tongue, stating there "should be equal opportunities to participate in Sámi politics". On the question of whether the president of the Sámi parliament should speak Sámi, the NKF believes that it is acceptable if they were to speak Norwegian, as two out of three Sámi individuals cannot speak a Sámi language. The North Calotte People are in favour of language policies that allow students to exchange their Norwegian lessons in favor of instruction in the Kven or Sámi languages. The party is in favor of additional investment in Sámi language programs and the reinstatement of book buses in the Southern and Lule Sámi areas. However, the party stressed for the simultaneous need for equal opportunity in politics and a pragmatic approach towards language.

The party advocates for equal treatment and equal conditions between the Norwegian, Sámi, and Kven populations of the north. On issues of land use, the North Calotte People cite the communal usage by the three groups as basis for the rejection of Sámi veto rights over northern land. During the 2013 election, North Calotte People expressed their interest for the transformation of the Sámi Parliament into a joint Sámi and Kven parliament.

The party has been criticized by the leader of the Norwegian Sámi Association, Runar Myrnes Balto, for having "refined the art of attacking the rights of Sámi and presenting it as an equality project". He stated that the party portrayed the Sámi as wanting to have supremacy over the northern peoples, leading to an image of a culture war in the north. Myrnes Balto described the leader of the North Calotte People, Toril Bakken Kåven, as a "Trumper". Myrnes Balto had previously compared the party's policies to those of Jarl Hellesvik and his anti-Sámi organization EDL.

=== Environment ===
North Calotte People oppose expanding additional protections on local lands, citing the sustainable use of nature as the best kind of protection. The party additionally opposes the concept of the Sámi veto right with regards to land and natural encroachment by industry, an idea put forth by the NSR, Labour, and Centre parties. The party has previously worked to loosen protection for Sámi outfield industry, which was criticized by the NSR for paving the way for industries to gain access to the outfields.

== Electoral history ==
Sámediggi
Date	Votes			Seats		Position	Size
Date	#	%	± pp	#	±	Position	Size
2005	164	1.8	New	1 / 43	New	Opposition	8th
2009	184	1.9	▲0.1	1 / 39	Steady	Opposition	▼9th
2013	431	4.3	▲2.4	3 / 39	▲2	Opposition	▲4th
2017	772	6.6	▲2.2	3 / 39	Steady	Opposition	▲3rd
2021	2,529	18.3	▲11.7	9 / 39	▲6	Opposition	▲2nd
