= Sven-Roald Nystø =

Norwegian Lule Sámi politician

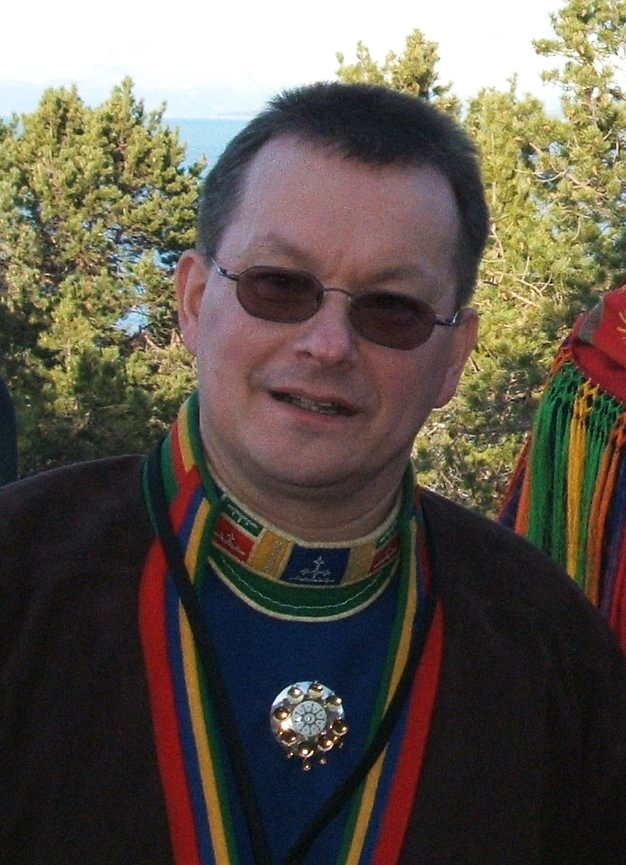
- Nystø in 2015

Sámi Parliament President
- In office 1997–2005
- Preceded by: Ole Henrik Magga
- Succeeded by: Aili Keskitalo

Personal details
- Born: 30 September 1956 (age 70) Tysfjord Municipality, Norway
- Party: Norwegian Sámi Association
- Education: University of Tromsø

Sven-Roald Nystø (born 30 September 1956) is a Lule Sámi politician from Storå in Tysfjord Municipality, Norway. He has worked for the Lule Sámi cultural and language center Árran as a senior advisor.

Nystø has been a board member and leader of the Norwegian Sámi Association. He served as a representative in the Sámi Parliament of Norway from 1993 to 1995, representing the districts of Midt-Troms and Midtre-Nordland for the Norwegian Sámi Association. Nystø was later the president of the Sámi Parliament for two terms, from 1997 to 2005. Before he became president, he was vice-president under Ole Henrik Magga. He also served on Samerettsutvalget, the Sámi Rights Committee, and was head of the Indigenous Committee on the Barents Regional Council.

Nystø led the work of the Sámi Parliament in consultations with the Norwegian authorities on the Finnmark Act. Nystø was also president when the Sámi Parliament and the Bondevik government signed an agreement on consultations between the government and the Sámi Parliament on matters of particular concern to the Sámi population.

He received his master's degree from the University of Tromsø.

Political offices
Preceded by Ole Henrik Magga	President of the Sami Parliament; 1997–2005	Succeeded by Aili Keskitalo
