= Ellinor Jåma =

Norwegian politician

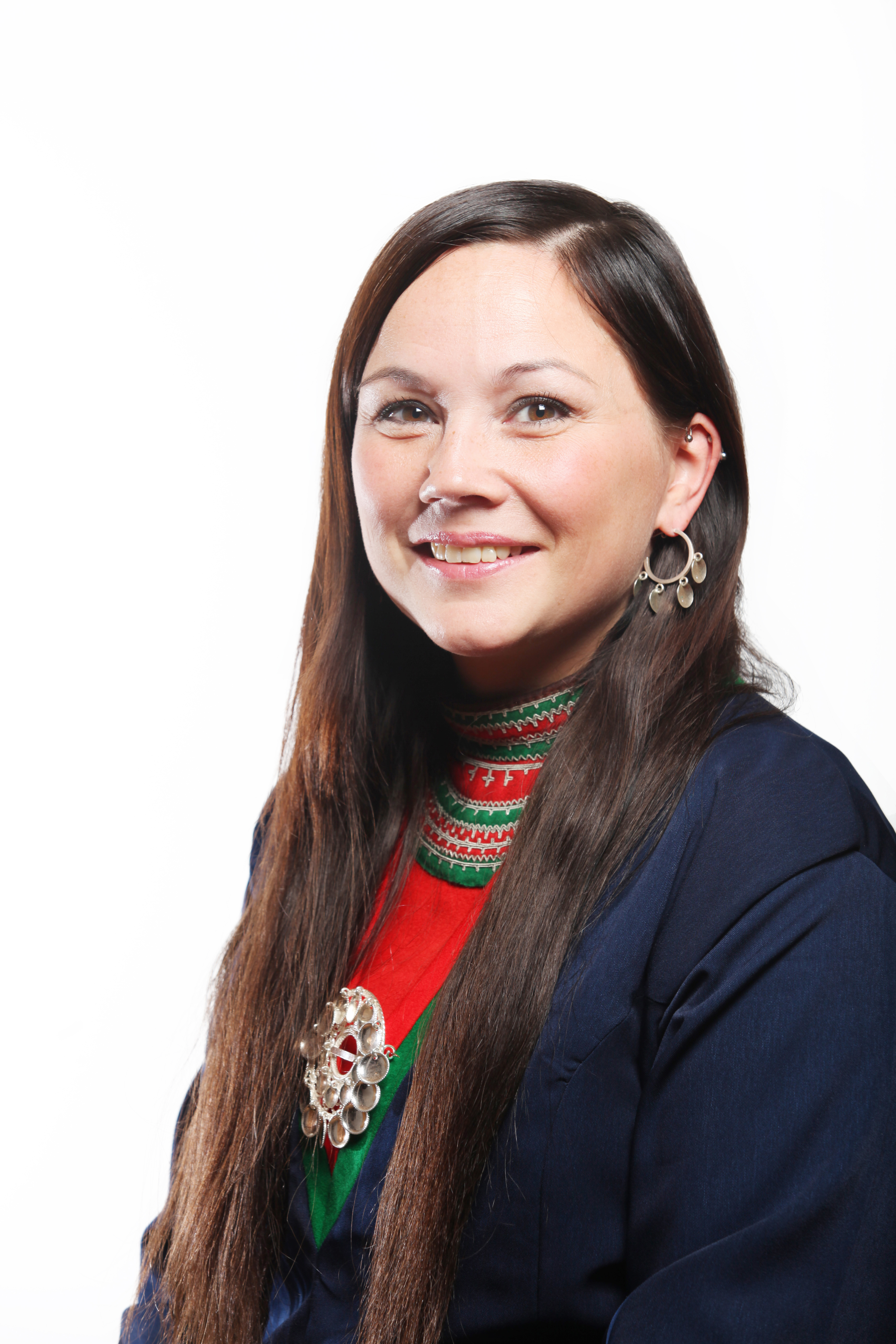
Ellinor Jåma

Ellinor Marita Jåma (born 8 August 1979) is a Norwegian Sami politician, representing Åarjel-Saemiej Gielh (South Sami Voices) in the Sami Parliament of Norway. She has been elected for two consecutive periods: 2009–13 and 2013–17. She is also active in the promotion of Sami culture and language.

== Career ==
Jåma has a background in teaching, graduating in psychology, with a master's degree from the Norwegian University of Science and Technology, Trondheim. She was elected twice to the Sami Parliament of Norway, serving consecutive terms between 2009-2013 and 2013-2017.

== Reindeer herding ==
In June 2014, Jåma was elected leader of the Reindeer Herders Association of Norway (Norske Reindriftssamers Landsforbund). She was the first woman to hold the post for 30 years. At only 35 on her election, she was the youngest leader ever.

== Sami culture ==
Interviewed on Norwegian television, Jåma explained how important it was for her to revive the Sami culture. "We have a lasting legacy, for which I wish to be a spokesman. Today I see the bureaucrats and politicians maintaining they know what is best for the Sami. But thanks to the Sami Parliament, we can influence things ourselves." She was also keen to support the Sami languages which had almost died out in some places. In this connection, Jåma had taken things into her own hands, producing the first ever children's television programme in the Southern Sami language.
