= Láilá Susanne Vars =

Sámi lawyer & politician (born 1976)

Laila Susanne Vars
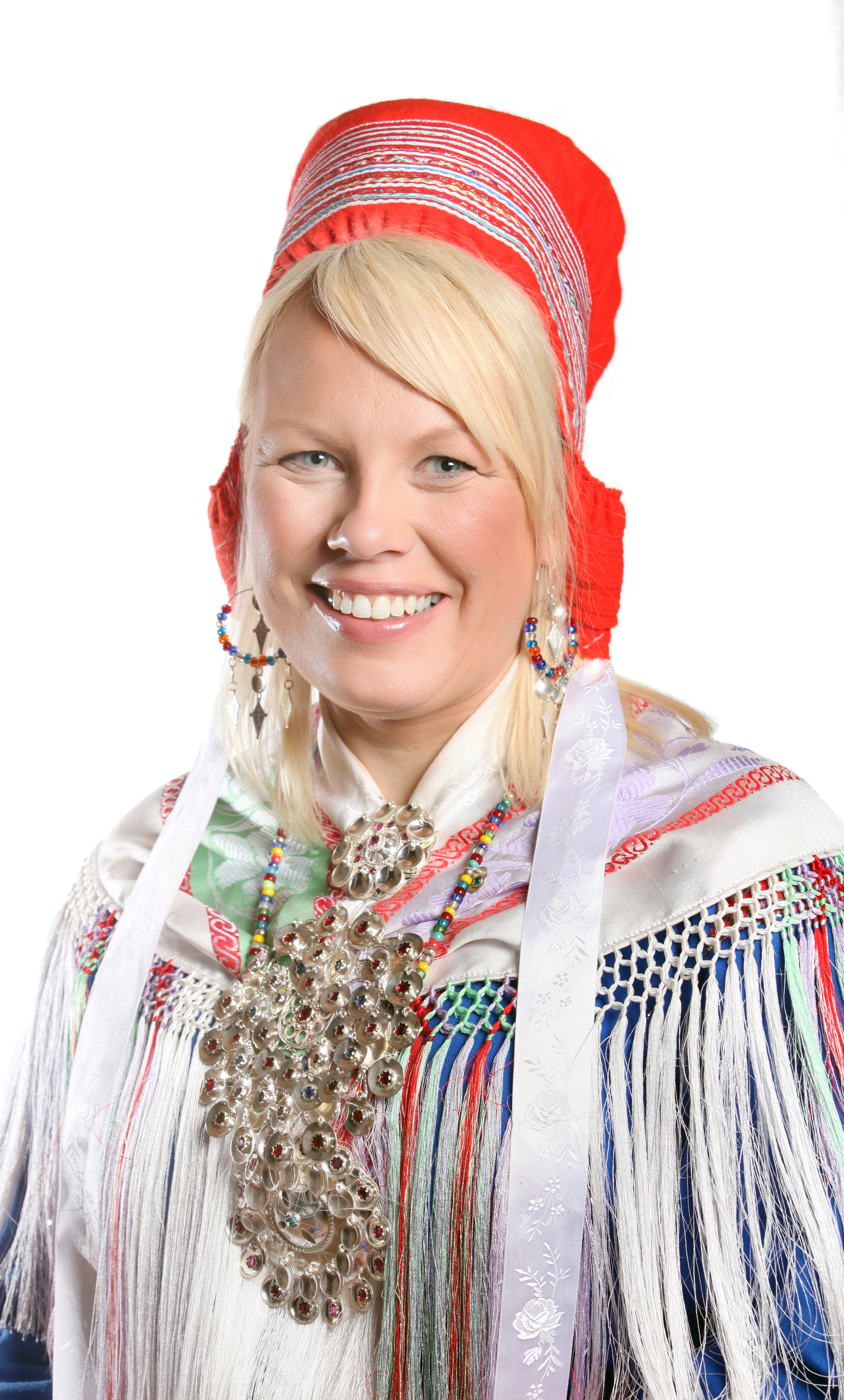
- Born: Láhpoluoppal, Kautokeino Municipality, Finnmark county, Norway
- Education: University of Tromsø - The Arctic University of Norway
- Occupations: Lawyer, politician
- Political party: Árja

Laila Susanne Vars is a Norwegian-Sami human rights lawyer and former politician. Elected rector of Sámi University of Applied Sciences 2019-2023. First Sámi woman to achieve a PhD in Law. Vars is appointed by the Government of Sweden, Ministry of Culture as Commissioner of the Truth Commission for the Sámi People in Sweden. She is former research director at the Norwegian National Human Rights Institution (NHRI) and former Expert member of the United Nations' Expert Mechanism on the Rights of Indigenous Peoples (EMRIP) 2017-2023.

She led the Sami Árja party from 2008 to 2010, and was vice president of the Sami Parliament of Norway from 2009 to 2013. In 2013, she became the director of the Gáldu Resource Centre for the Rights of Indigenous Peoples, which was based in Kautokeino Municipality, Norway. When Gáldu was integrated into the NHRI in 2017, Vars worked AS research director at the NHRI.

== Biography ==
Vars studied law at the University of Tromsø, earning her cand.jur. degree in 2001 and her doctorate in international law in 2010, with a dissertation entitled "The Sámi People's Right to Self-determination".

She worked as a legal adviser for the Sami Parliament from 2001 to 2004, and she played a central role in the adoption of the Finnmark Act, which gave about 95% of the land of Finnmark county to its inhabitants. She also participated in the negotiations on the United Nations Declaration on the Rights of Indigenous Peoples on behalf of the Sami Parliament. She has led the Sami Jurists Association and has sat on several committees at the University of Tromsø. She has also published several articles on Sami and indigenous rights.

During the Sami parliamentary election of 2009, she was the first candidate on the Árja party's list for the second (Ávjovárri) electoral district. She was elected to the Sami Parliament, beating two former Sami Parliament presidents in her district, and served as vice president for the 2009–2013 term. On 25 February 2010, the Sami Parliament decided that Executive Council members would not participate in plenary, so Alf Isaksen took over her plenary seat as substitute member.

Vars was re-elected for the 2013–2017 term and led Árja's contingent in the Sami Parliament. She sat on the Planning and Finance Committee as well as the Executive Council from 2013 to 2017. Vars asked to be relieved of her duties as a member of parliament as of 1 January 2017 when she took her position at the NHRI.

From 2013 to 2015, Vars served as a member of the Norwegian government's Tater/Romani Committee, which focused on the relationship between the government and the Norwegian Travellers. From 2013 to 2016, she was a member of the Norwegian National Commission for UNESCO.

Vars has served as vice-president of the board of the Faculty of Law at the University of Tromsø, and was an institutional board member of the International Work Group for Indigenous Affairs, based in Copenhagen, Denmark.

On 24 March 2017, she was selected to serve as the expert member from the Arctic on the Expert Mechanism on the Rights of Indigenous Peoples (EMRIP), an advisory body of the Office of the United Nations High Commissioner for Human Rights. She was reappointed by the Human Rights Council for a second term as Expert member of the Mechanism in 2021.

She was elected as president/ rector of Sámi allaskuvla - Sámi University of Applied Sciences in 2019, and her term ended in 2023.

Vars was in 2021 appointed as member of the executive board of Redd Barna (Save the Children) Norway. In 2022 the Norwegian Ministry of Education and Research elected her as member of the executive board of Norwegian Institute of International Affairs (NUPI). In 2023 she was elected as chairperson for RIKSSCENEN, The Norwegian Hub for Traditional and Sámi Music and Dance RIKSSCENEN and the same year she was also elected as member of the board of the Sámi Music Festival. https://www.samieasterfestival.com/min-birra-25?lang=en

In 2023 Vars was elected as member of the Municipality Board of Guovdageainnu suohkan- Kautokeino kommune 2023-2027, and as member of the Chairmannship (Formannskap) of the Municipality. She represents the sámi political party Árja.

In 2022 Vars was appointed as Commissioner in the Truth Commission for the Sámi People in Sweden. She is the only Commissioner who´s not a Swedish citizen in the Commission, and was appointed based on her international expertise in Truth and Reconciliation processes, Indigenous Peoples Rights and Constitutional Law.

Vars works currently at the Sámi Parliament in Norway as Senior Advisor in the Section for Parliamentary Administration and Elections.
