= Egil Olli =

Norwegian politician

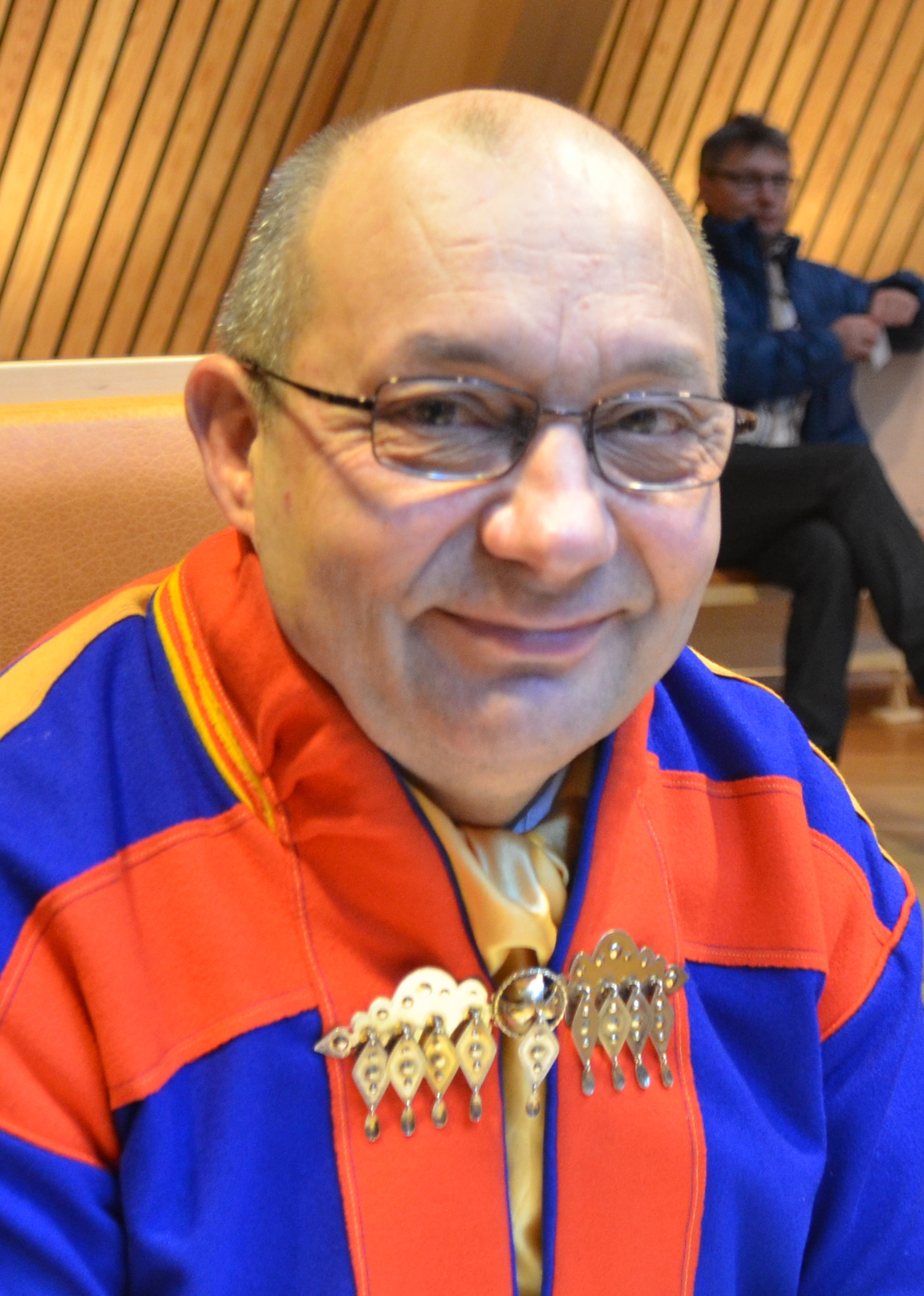

4th President of the Norwegian Sami Parliament
- In office 26 September 2007 – 16 October 2013
- Preceded by: Aili Keskitalo
- Succeeded by: Aili Keskitalo

Personal details
- Born: Egil Andreas Olli; 13 October 1949 (age 76) Porsáŋggu Municipality, Norway
- Party: Labour

Egil Andreas Olli (born 13 October 1949) is a Norwegian politician for the Labour Party. In September 2007, he became President of the Sami Parliament of Norway when he replaced Aili Keskitalo after she stepped down upon the collapse of the coalition she was heading. He was the fourth President of the Sami Parliament, and the first not to represent the Norwegian Sami Association. In early 2012 Olli announced that he would not run for reelection.

Preceded by Aili Keskitalo	Presidents of the Sami Parliament; 2007–2013	Succeeded by Aili Keskitalo
