= Vibeke Larsen =

Norwegian Sami politician

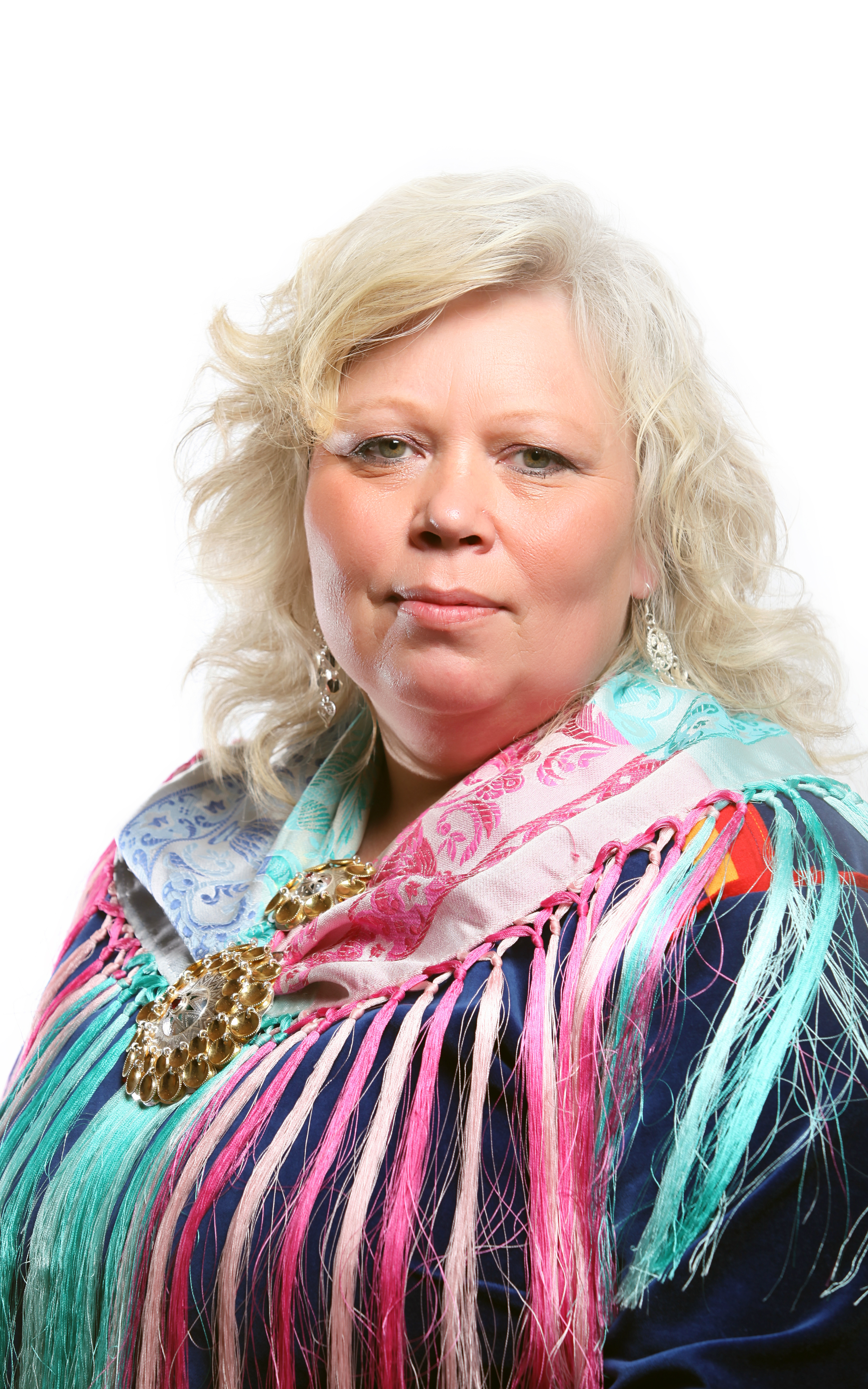

President of the Norwegian Sami Parliament
- In office 8 December 2016 – 12 October 2017
- Vice President: Ronny Wilhelmsen (2016–2017); Lars Filip Paulsen (2017)
- Preceded by: Aili Keskitalo
- Succeeded by: Aili Keskitalo

Personal details
- Born: 15 June 1971 (age 55) Vassdalen, Narvik, Norway
- Party: Nordkalottfolket
- Occupation: Politician

Vibeke Larsen (born 15 June 1971) is a Norwegian Sami politician and leader of Nordkalottfolket since 2024. She was formerly a member of the Labour Party and Šiella.

She was born in Vassdalen in Narvik. She was elected to the Sami Parliament of Norway in 2005. From 2009 to 2013 she was member of the Sametingsrådet. She served as president of the Sami Parliament from 2016 to 2017. Larsen was elected as leader of Nordkalottfolket in 2024, and was the party's presidential candidate in the 2025 Norwegian Sámi parliamentary election.

== The Larsen Council ==
Larsen became President of the Sami Parliament following a motion of no confidence against then-president Aili Keskitalo in December 2016. Her council was a coalition between the Labour Party, Árja and the Conservatives. From December 2016 until 28 January 2017, her council consisted of herself as president, Ronny Wilhelmsen (Labour) as vice president, Mariann Wollmann Magga (Labour), Lars Filip Paulsen (Conservative) and Inger Eline Eriksen Fjellgren (Árja).

From 28 January 2017 until March the same year, her council only consisted of herself, Wollmann Magga, Paulsen and Eriksen Fjellgren after she fired vice president Wilhelmsen following internal conflict in the Labour Party. She argued that Wilhelmsen had worked against her and supported a motion of no confidence against her. She also resigned her membership of the Labour Party and thereby became the first Sami Parliament president to not belong to a party. She appointed Lars Filip Paulsen as her vice president and continued to serve as president until the 2017 election, when Aili Keskitalo formed her third council and succeeded her as president.

Preceded by Aili Keskitalo	President of the Sami Parliament; 2016–2017	Succeeded by Aili Keskitalo
