= Aili Keskitalo =

Norwegian Sami politician

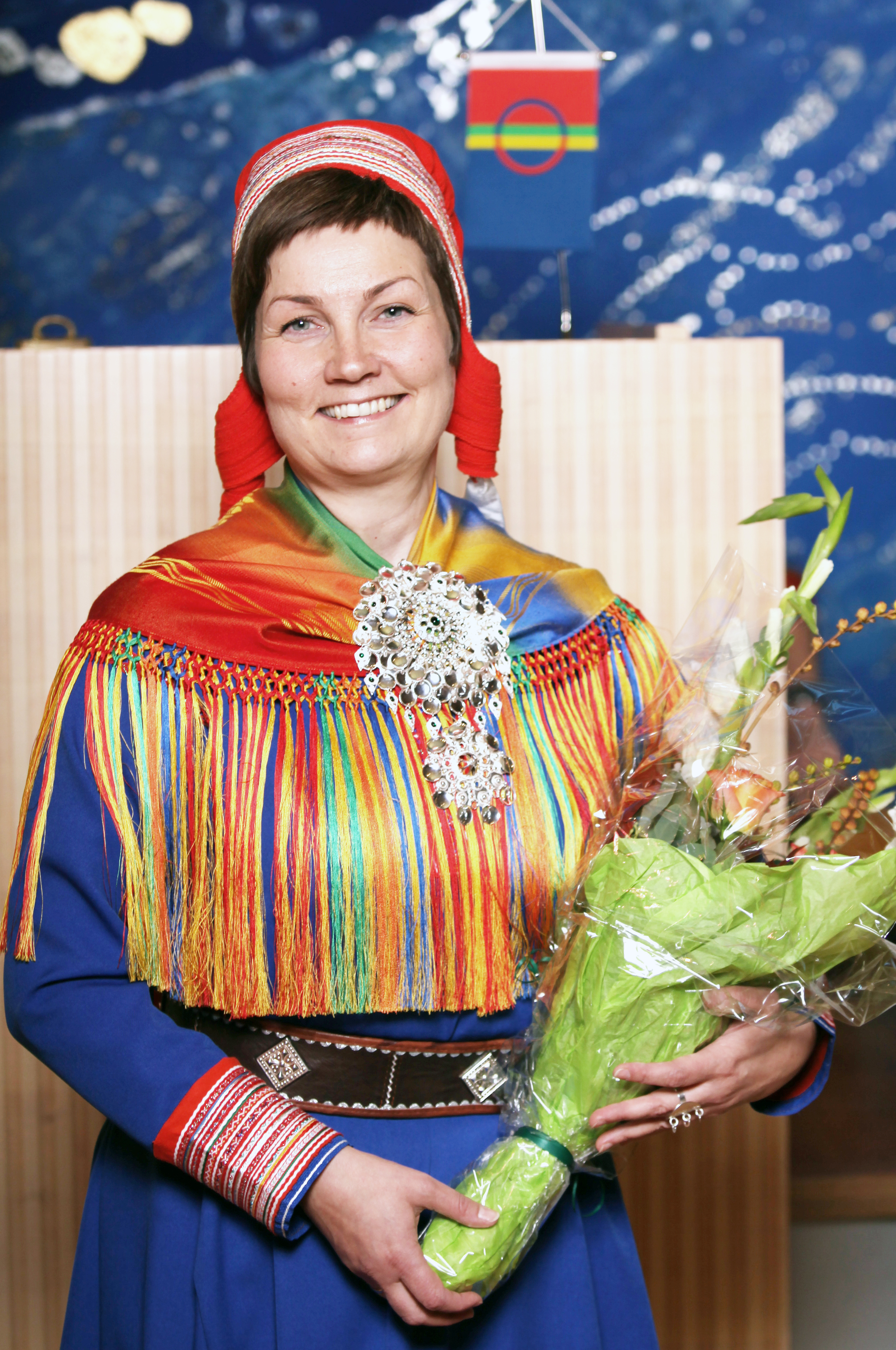
- Official portrait, 2013

President of the Sami Parliament of Norway
- In office 12 October 2017 – 21 October 2021
- Preceded by: Vibeke Larsen
- Succeeded by: Silje Karine Muotka
- In office 16 October 2013 – 8 December 2016
- Preceded by: Egil Olli
- Succeeded by: Vibeke Larsen
- In office 20 October 2005 – 26 September 2007
- Preceded by: Sven-Roald Nystø
- Succeeded by: Egil Olli

Personal details
- Born: 29 October 1968 (age 57) Kautokeino, Finnmark, Norway
- Party: NSR
- Children: 3

Aili Keskitalo (born 29 October 1968) is a Norwegian Sámi politician representing the Norwegian Sámi Association (NSR), who has served as the president of the Sámi Parliament for three terms, from 2005 to 2007, 2013 to 2016 and 2017 to 2021.

Prior to her current presidency, she served as president of the Sámi Parliament of Norway in 2005, the third in its history and the first female President of any Sámi Parliament. She stepped down in September 2007. The collapse of her coalition made way for the first ever non-NSR presidency, led by Egil Olli from the Norwegian Labour Party. She was re-elected in 2013 and served until 2016. In 2017, she returned for her third stint as president of the Sámi Parliament. In 2020, Keskitalo announced that she would not seek re-election in the 2021 election.

She has a Master in Public Administration from Copenhagen Business School, in which she compared the school systems in Norway and Greenland.

Keskitalo was the first Sámi President whose mother tongue was not Sámi but Norwegian. However, she speaks Northern Sámi fluently.

== See also ==
- Sámi politics
  - Sámi Parliament of Russia
  - Norwegian Sámi Association
  - Keskitalo's Third Council

Preceded by Vibeke Larsen	President of the Sami Parliament; 2017–2021	Succeeded by Silje Karine Muotka
Preceded by Egil Olli	President of the Sami Parliament; 2013–2016	Succeeded by Vibeke Larsen
Preceded by Sven-Roald Nystø	President of the Sami Parliament; 2005–2007	Succeeded by Egil Olli
