= People's Federation of the Saami =

The People's Federation of the Saami or the Saami Peoples Union (Norwegian: Samenes Folkeforbund, Northern Sami: Sámiid Álbmotlihttu) is an organization for the Sami people in Norway. The Federation was established in 1993. It is a member organization of the Saami Council.
