= Sámi People's Party =

Sámi People's Party Sámeálbmot bellodat Samefolkets Parti
- Leader: Birger Randulf Nymo
- Founded: 15 October 1999
- Headquarters: Karasjok
- Ideology: Sámi peoples' interests
- Colours: Red, Green, Yellow, Blue
- Parliament: 0 / 169
- County Councils: 2 / 728
- Municipal Councils: 0 / 10,781
- Sámi Parliament (Norway): 1 / 39

Website
- www.samefolketsparti.no

The Sámi People's Party (Norwegian: Samefolkets Parti, Northern Sami: Sámeálbmot bellodat) is a Norwegian political party, founded on 15 October 1999, without parliamentary representation, that refers to the Sámi ethnic minority in Northern Norway.
