= Norwegian Sámi Association =

Norwegian Sámi Association Norgga Sámiid Riikasearvi Vuona Sámij Rijkasiebre Nøørjen Saemiej Rijhkesiebrie Norske Samers Riksforbund
- Leader: Beatrice Fløystad
- Founded: 1968
- Ideology: Sámi interests
- Colours: Yellow
- Sámi Parliament: 18 / 39

Website
- http://nsr.no/

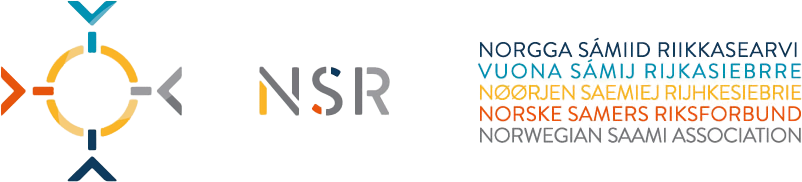
Logo of the Norwegian Sámi Association

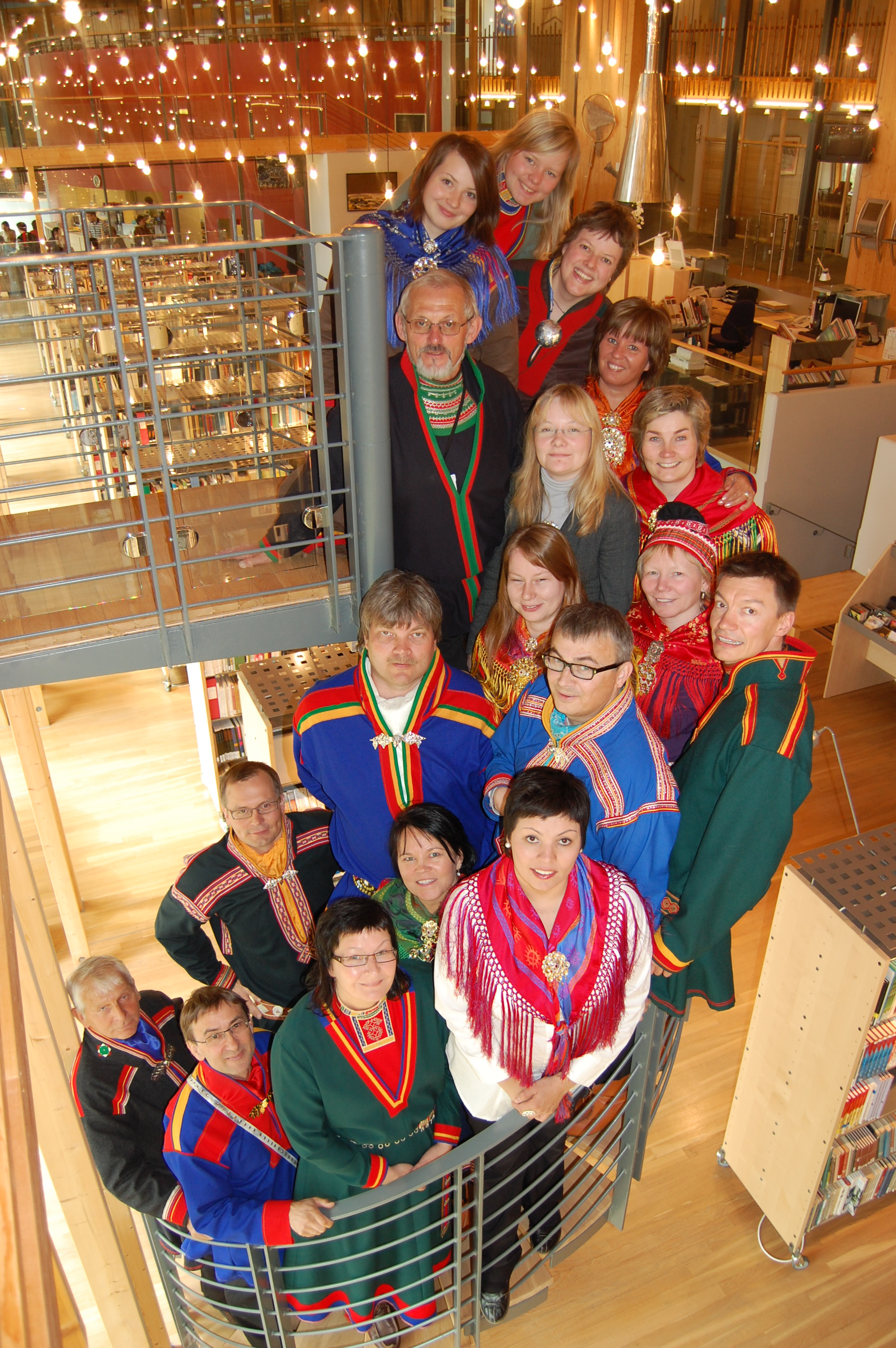
NSR Members of the Sámi Parliament of Norway 2005–2009

The Norwegian Sámi Association (Northern Sami: Norgga Sámiid Riikasearvi [ˈnorːkka ˈsaːmijt ˈrijːkaˌsea̯rːviː]; Lule Sami: Vuona Sámij Rijkasiebre; Southern Sami: Nøørjen Saemiej Rijhkesiebrie; Norwegian: Norske Samers Riksforbund), also known as NSR, is the largest Sámi organization in Norway. The association was founded in 1968.

== Purpose ==
The NSR actively runs cultural, social, and informational work through local groups and Sámi associations. In total, 24 Sámi associations are attached to the NSR. The NSR is also active politically, running for elections in Sametinget (the Sámi Parliament of Norway) and sending delegates to the Sámi Council.

The NSR was founded in 1968, so it has been contributing to the development of Sámi society and culture since before the Sámi Parliament was established. The NSR goal is to unite the Sámi people across different special interests. As such, the NSR is independent of any outside political parties or religions.

Since the establishment of the Sámi Parliament in 1989, the NSR has held the leadership and presidency of the organization. The Sámi Parliament presidents have been Ole Henrik Magga from Kautokeino (1989–1997), Sven-Roald Nystø from Tysfjord (1997–2005), and Aili Keskitalo from Kautokeino (2005–2007, 2013–2016 and 2017–2021).

== Presidents ==
The following table lists the presidents of the NSR since its founding.

Name	Term
Beatrice Fløystad	2022–present
Vidar Andersen (acting)	2021–2022
Runar Myrnes Balto	2018–2021
Niillas Beaska	2014–2018
Gunn Britt Retter (acting)	2013–2014
Aili Keskitalo	2008–2013
Silje Karine Muotka	2006–2008
Martin Urheim (acting)	2005–2006
Aili Keskitalo	2003–2005
Klemet Erland Hætta	2001–2003
Janoš Trosten	1998–2001
Geir Tommy Pedersen (acting)	1997–1998
Sven-Roald Nystø	1995–1997
Nils Thomas Utsi	1991–1995
Ragnhild Lydia Nystad	1985–1991
Ole Henrik Magga	1980–1985
Odd Ivar Solbakk	1979–1980
Peder Andersen	1976–1979
Odd Mathis Hætta	1974–1976
Regnor Solbakk	1971–1974
Johan Mathis Klemetsen	1969–1971
