= Muotka's Council =

- 9th Governing Council of the Sámi Parliament of Norway
- Incumbent
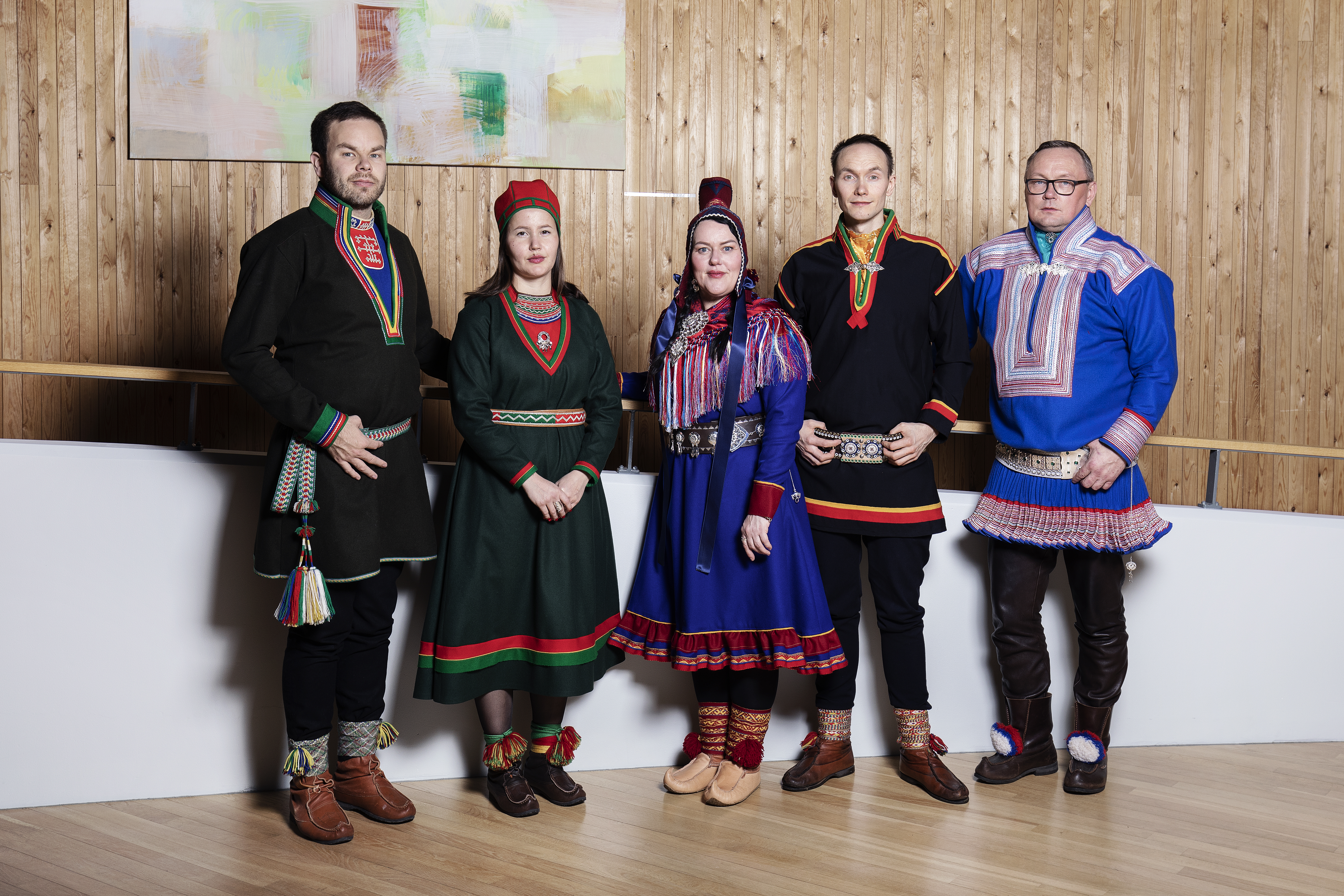
- Date formed: 21 October 2021

People and organisations
- Head of state: Harald V of Norway
- Head of government: Silje Karine Muotka
- No. of ministers: 5
- Member party: Norwegian Sámi Association; Centre Party; Ávjovári Moving Sámi List
- Status in legislature: Coalition majority government (2021–present)
- Opposition party: Nordkalottfolket
- Opposition leader: Toril Bakken Kåven

History
- Election: 2021
- Legislature term: 2021-2025
- Predecessor: Keskitalo's Third Council

Muotka's Council is the incumbent governing council of the Sámi Parliament of Norway, headed by the President Silje Karine Muotka of the Norwegian Sámi Association. The governing council was installed on 21 October 2021, following the 2021 Norwegian Sámi parliamentary election. It is a coalition council consisting of the Norwegian Sámi Association, the Centre Party, and the Ávjovári Moving Sámi List, known as the Beaiveálgu coalition.

== Responsibilities ==
The Governing Council heads the executive branch of the Sami parliamentary system in Norway. The President of the Sami Parliament is the head of the executive branch. The Governing Council is composed by the President and four other council members. They hold full-time positions and are responsible for the daily political business of the Sami Parliament.

== List of councillors ==
Portfolio	Minister	Took office	Left office	Party
President of the Sámi Parliament of Norway: Rights; Border Reduction and All-Sámi and International work; Relocation, Regional Development and City Agreements; Creative Industries, Tourism and Varied Business; Fishing, Salmon and Combination and Outfield Industries	Silje Karine Muotka	21 October 2021	Incumbent	NSR
Member of the Governing Council: Budget, Annual Report and Accounts; Sameness, Truth and Reconciliation; Health and Social; Gender Equality and Diversity; Statistics; Digitization	Runar Myrnes Balto	21 October 2021	Incumbent	NSR
Member of the Governing Council: Language; Upbringing, Education and Research; Youth policy	Mikkel Eskil Mikkelsen	21 October 2021	Incumbent	NSR
Member of the Governing Council: Culture; Climate, Environment and Energy; Area; Media	Maja Kristine Jåma	21 October 2021	Incumbent	NSR
Member of the Governing Council: Cultural Monuments and Building Protection; Traditional Knowledge; Duodji; Elderly Policy; Reindeer Husbandry and Agriculture; Predatory Game; Finnmark Estate Agency; Church and Outlook on Life	Hans Ole Eira	21 October 2021	2023	Centre
Member of the Governing Council: Cultural Monuments and Building Protection; Traditional Knowledge; Duodji; Elderly Policy; Reindeer Husbandry and Agriculture; Predatory Game; Finnmark Estate Agency; Church and Outlook on Life	Berit Marie Eira	2023	Incumbent	Ávjovári Moving Sámi List

== See also ==
- Sámi politics
  - Sámi Parliament of Norway
  - Sámi Parliament of Finland
  - Sámi Parliament of Sweden
  - Sámi Parliament of Russia
- Elections in Norway
