= Keskitalo's Third Council =

- 8th Governing Council of the Sámi Parliament of Norway
- 2017–2021
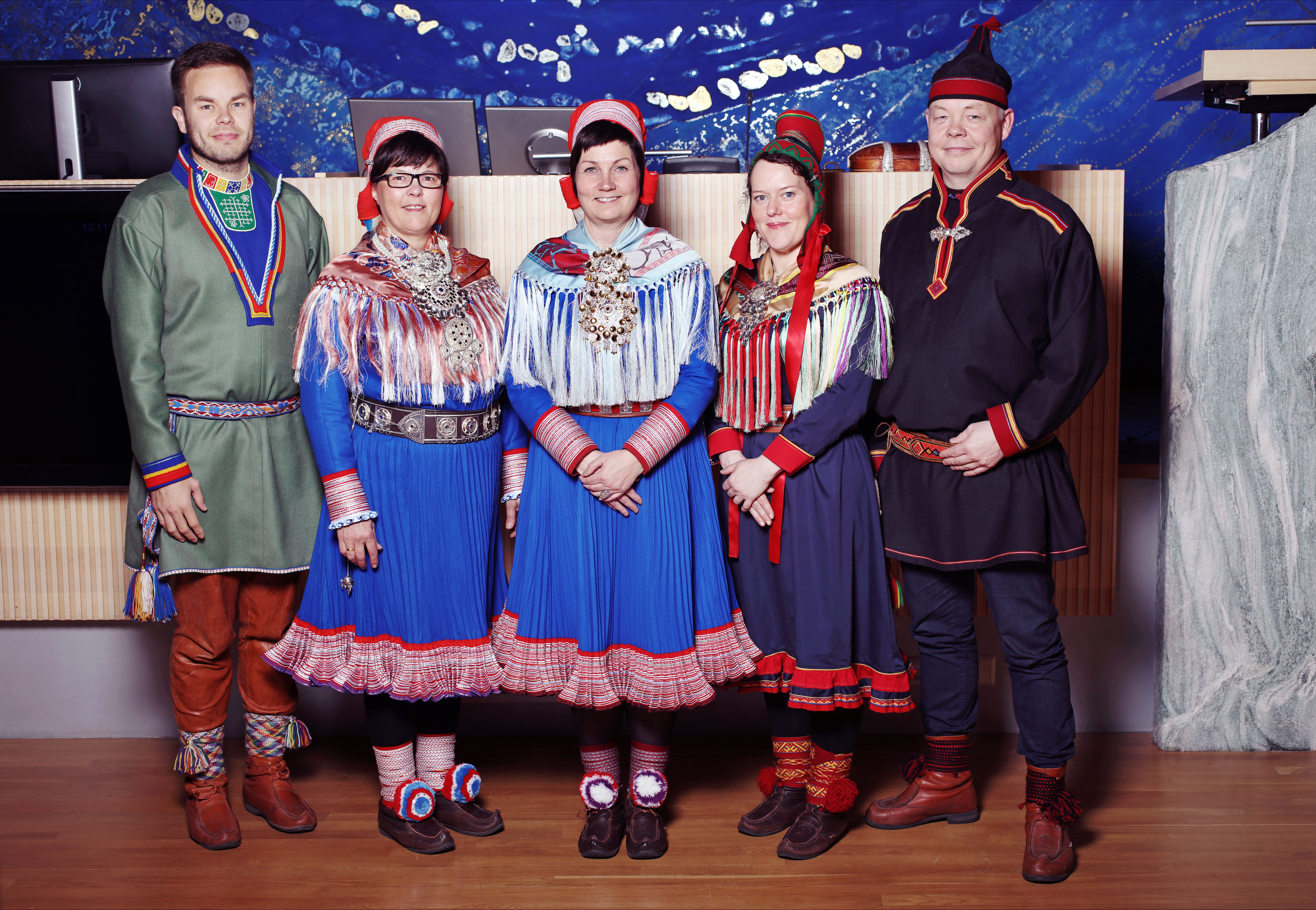
- Date formed: 12 October 2017
- Date dissolved: 21 October 2021

People and organisations
- Head of government: Aili Keskitalo
- No. of ministers: 5
- Member party: Norwegian Sami Association; Centre Party; Reindeer herder's list Åarjel-Saemiej Gïelh
- Status in legislature: Coalition majority government

History
- Election: 2017
- Legislature term: 2017–2021
- Predecessor: Larsen's Council
- Successor: Muotka's Council

Keskitalo's Third Council was a governing council of the Sámi Parliament of Norway, headed by the President Aili Keskitalo of the Norwegian Sami Association. The governing council was installed on 12 October 2017, following the 2017 Norwegian Sámi parliamentary election, and served until 21 October 2021. It was a coalition council consisting of the Norwegian Sami Association/Norwegian Sami Association and Sami People's Party joint list (NSR/NSR-SáB), the Centre Party, the Reindeer herders list (JSL) and Åarjel-Saemiej Gïelh (ÅAsG), known as the Muohtačalmmit coalition.

== Responsibilities ==
The Governing Council heads the executive branch of the Sami parliamentary system in Norway. The President of the Sami Parliament is the head of the executive branch. The Governing Council is composed by the President and four other council members. They hold full-time positions and are responsible for the daily political business of the Sami Parliament.

== List of councillors ==
Portfolio	Minister	Took office	Left office	Party
President of the Sámi Parliament of Norway responsible for rights, language, and cross-border and international cooperation	Aili Keskitalo	12 October 2017	21 October 2021	NSR
Councillor of Culture and Finance, responsible Truth and Reconciliation Commission	Henrik Olsen	12 October 2017	21 October 2021	NSR
Councillor of Environment, Industry, and Developmental issues responsible for the Finnmark Estate Agency	Silje Karine Muotka	12 October 2017	21 October 2021	NSR
Councillor of Health, Equality, Education, and Research	Mikkel Eskil Mikkelsen	12 October 2017	21 October 2021	NSR
Councillor of Cultural Heritage, Traditional Knowledge, and Duodji responsible for youth council and senior council of the Sámi Parliament of Norway	Berit Marie P.E. Eira	12 October 2017	21 October 2021	Reindeer herder's list

== See also ==
- Sámi politics
  - Sámi Parliament of Norway
  - Sámi Parliament of Finland
  - Sámi Parliament of Sweden
  - Sámi Parliament of Russia
- Elections in Norway
