= Hålogalandsallmenningen =

Proposed organisation in Norway

Hålogalandsallmenningen is the proposed name for the organization which is expected to manage about 50% of the land and inland water resources in the counties of Troms and Nordland in Norway. It expected that the members in the board of directors will be elected from the County Council of Troms, the County Council of Norland, and the Sami Parliament of Norway. A similar organization, the Finnmark Estate, is already established in the county of Finnmark.

== Background ==
The background for the Finnmark Act is the Sámi people's fight for their rights to manage their land and culture. In 1978 the Norwegian Water Resources and Energy Directorate published a plan that called for the construction of a dam and hydroelectric power plant that would create an artificial lake and inundate the Sami village of Máze. This plan was met by a strong opposition from the Sámi, and resulted in the Alta controversy. As a result of the controversy, the Norwegian government held meetings in 1980 and 1981 with a Sámi delegation appointed by the Norwegian Sámi Association, the Sámi Reindeer Herders’ Association of Norway and the Norwegian Sámi Council. The meetings resulted in the establishment of the Sámi Rights Committee addressing Sámi legal relations, that proposed among other things the establishing the Sami Parliament, and finally the adoption of the Finnmark Act in 2005.

The Sámi rights to lands, waters and resources were strengthened after 1990, when Norway recognized the Sámi as an indigenous people by adapting the ILO convention 169 concerning Indigenous and Tribal Peoples in Independent Countries. The convention states that rights for the indigenous peoples to land and natural resources are recognized as central for their material and cultural survival. In addition, indigenous peoples should be entitled to exercise control over, and manage, their own institutions, ways of life and economic development in order to maintain and develop their identities, languages and religions, within the framework of the States in which they live.

In 2001 a committee known as Samerettsutvalget was established to evaluate the Sámi rights to lands, waters and resources in Troms and Norland. The committee finished its work in 2007, and proposed to establish Hålogalandsallmenningen.
