= 2025 Norwegian Sámi parliamentary election =

Election for the Sámi Parliament

- 8 September 2025
- All 39 seats in the Sámi Parliament; 20 seats needed for a majority
| Party | Leader | Vote % | Seats | +/– |
|---|---|---|---|---|
| NSR | Silje Karine Muotka | 38.0 | 18 | +1 |
| NKF | Vibeke Larsen | 31.9 | 15 | +6 |
| Labour | Svein Atle Somby | 11.4 | 4 | −3 |
| SáB | Ann-Elise Finbog | 4.8 | 1 | 0 |
| Flyttsamelista (Note: Also known as the Ávjovári Moving Sámi List) | Berit Marie Eira | 2.4 | 1 | 0 |
This lists parties that won seats. See the complete results below.
Distribution of seats by electoral district
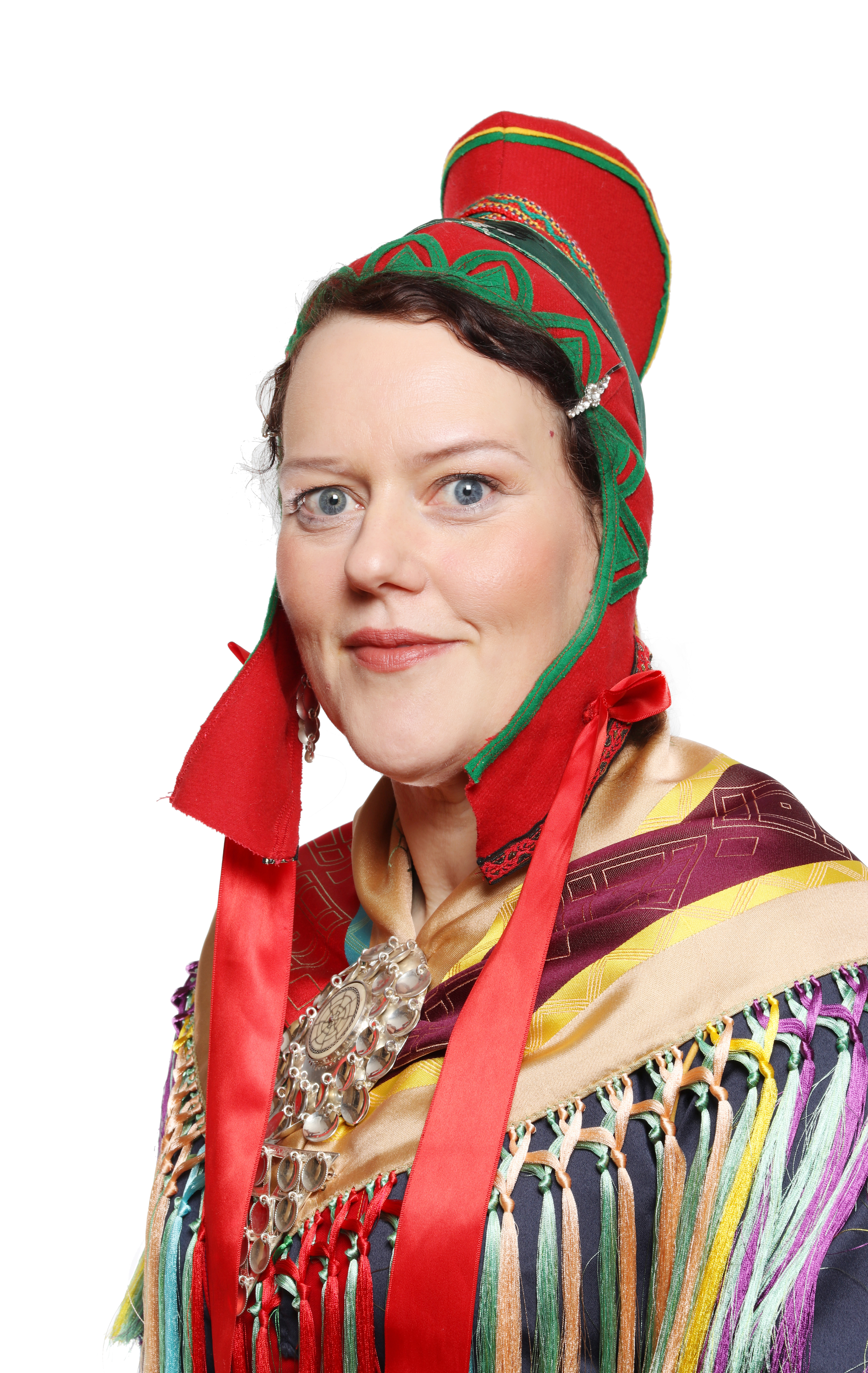

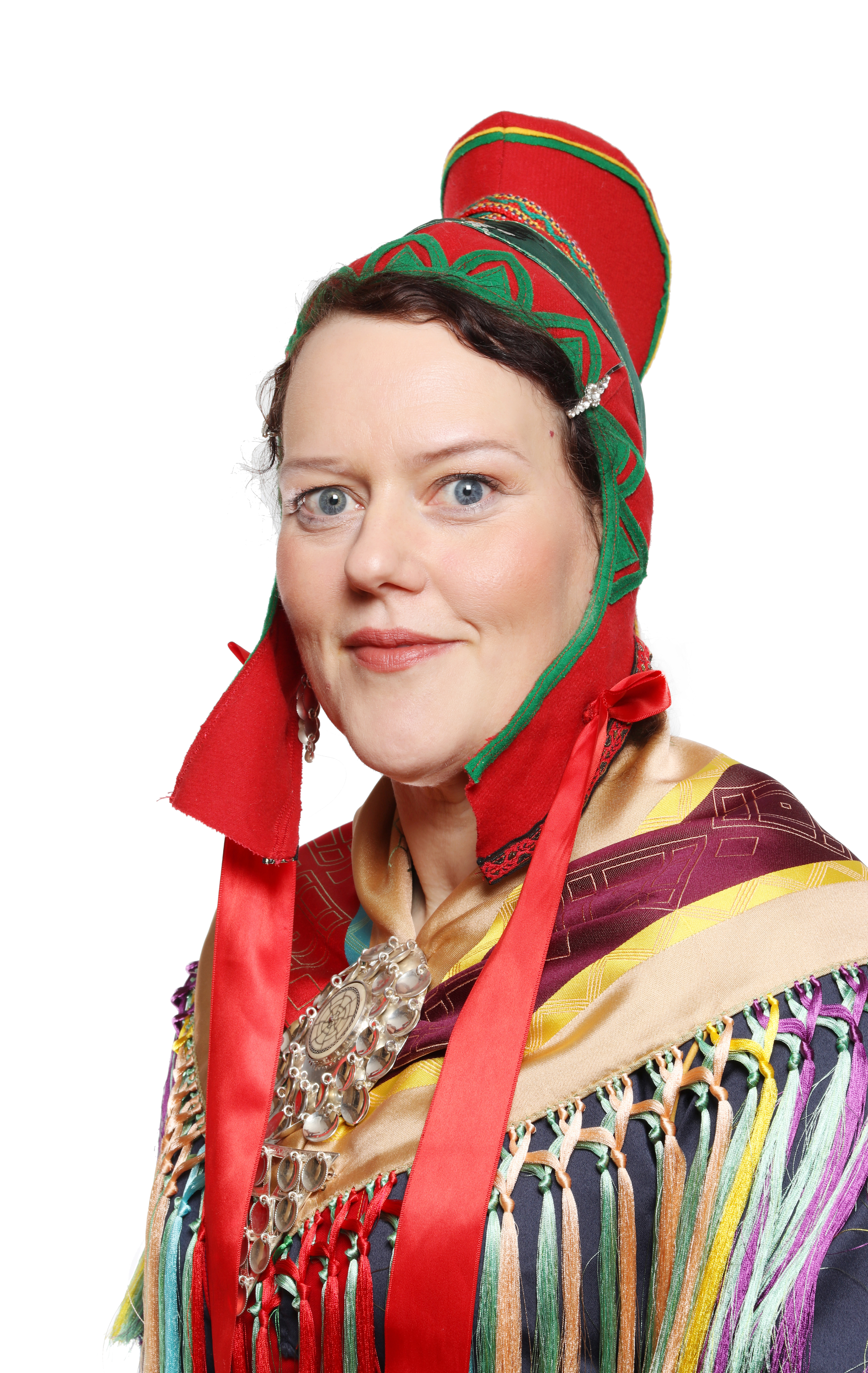
| President of the Sámi Parliament before | President of the Sámi Parliament after |
|---|---|
| Silje Karine Muotka; NSR | Silje Karine Muotka; NSR |

The 2025 Norwegian Sámi parliamentary election was held on 8 September 2025 to elect all 39 seats in the Sámi Parliament of Norway.

== Background ==
=== Previous election ===
In the previous election, held on 13 September 2021, the Norwegian Sámi Association, with Silje Karine Muotka as their presidential candidate, won a plurality of seats. After the elections, Muotka expressed support for a renewal of the previous coalition with the Centre Party and Ávjovári Moving Sámi List. The three parties presented their coalition agreement, the Beaiveálgu Declaration, on 18 October, and Muotka took office as president on 21 October.

Nordkalottfolket, a populist party led by Toril Bakken Kåven, emerged as the second largest party in that election with 9 seats, beating the Labour Party into third. Other opposition parties included the Sámi People's Party and the Progress Party.

=== Presidential candidacies ===
The Norwegian Sámi Association nominated the incumbent president, Silje Karine Muotka. Nordkalottfolket nominated Vibeke Larsen, who served as president from 2016 to 2017, first for the Labour Party and later as an independent. The Labour Party nominated Svein Atle Somby.

== Electoral system ==
The election uses party-list proportional representation in 7 multi-member constituencies. Each constituency is given a minimum of 2 seats. The apportionment of the remaining 25 seats is based on the number of voters on the Sámi electoral roll on 30 June on the year of the last local elections in 2023, and allocated using the Sainte-Laguë method. Unlike elections to Storting, there are no levelling seats to ensure overall proportionality.

| Constituency | Seats | |
| Constituency | 2021 | 2025 |
|---|---|---|
| Østre | 5 | 5 |
| Ávjovári | 7 | 6 ▼ |
| Nordre | 6 | 6 |
| Gáisi | 6 | 6 |
| Vesthavet | 5 | 5 |
| Sørsamisk | 4 | 4 |
| Sør-Norge | 6 | 7▲ |
| Norway | 39 | |

Voters aged 18 or over, and registered on the Sámi electoral roll prior to 30 June 2025, are entitled to vote in the Sámi Parliament election. To register, a voter must declare that they identify as Sámi, and that they either have Sámi as their mother tongue, have a Sámi parent, grandparent or great-grandparent, or are the child of a person already on the electoral roll. Sámi people from Sweden, Finland or Russia must be registered in Norway for the past three years in order to register.

Advance voting was available from 10 August to 5 September (1 July for voters abroad or in Svalbard or Jan Mayen), and required for voters in municipalities with fewer than 30 people on the Sámi electoral roll.

== Contesting parties ==
The table below lists political parties elected to the Sámediggi in the 2021 parliamentary election.

| Name | | Lead candidate | Constituencies contested | 2021 result | |
| Name | | Lead candidate | Constituencies contested | Votes (%) | Seats |
|---|---|---|---|---|---|
| NSR | Norwegian Sámi Association; Norgga Sámiid Riikasearvi; Norske Samers Riksforbund | Silje Karine Muotka | All constituencies | 31.91% | 17 / 39 |
| NKF | Nordkalottfolket | Vibeke Larsen | All constituencies | 18.28% | 9 / 39 |
| Ap | Labour Party; Bargiidbellodat; Arbeiderpartiet | Svein Atle Somby | All constituencies | 15.04% | 7 / 39 |
| Sp | Centre Party; Guovddášbellodat; Senterpartiet | Tor Mikkola | All constituencies but Sør-Norge | 9.59% | 3 / 39 |
| SáB | Sámi People's Party; Sámeálbmot Bellodat; Samefolkets Parti | Ann-Elise Finbog | All constituencies but Gáisi | 5.58% | 1 / 39 |
| FrP | Progress Party; Ovddádusbellodat; Fremskrittspartiet | Ellen Eriksen | All constituencies | 4.77% | 1 / 39 |
| JSL | Ávjovári Moving Sámi List; Johttisápmelaččaid listu Flyttsamelista | Berit Marie Eira | Ávjovári | 2.38% | 1 / 39 |

The table below shows the extraparliamentary parties contesting the election.

| Name | | Lead candidate | Constituencies contested | 2021 result |
|---|---|---|---|---|
| H | Conservative Party; Olgešbellodat; Høyre | Lars Filip Paulsen | All constituencies | 4.31% |
| SFF | People's Federation of the Saami; Sámi Álbmotlihttu; Samenes Folkeforbund | Tor Mainer Bergersen | Østre | 1.45% |
| INP | Industry and Business Party; Industri- og Næringspartiet | Odd Eilert Persen | Nordre | Did not contest |
| Sel | Sameland List; Sámeeatnanlistu; Sámeeatnanlista | Sissel Gaup | Ávjovári | Did not contest |

== Opinion polls ==
| Polling execution | | | Parties | | | | | | | | | |
| Polling firm | Fieldwork date | Sample size | NSR | NKF | Ap | Sp | SáB | FrP | H | JSL | Others | Lead |
|---|---|---|---|---|---|---|---|---|---|---|---|---|
| Norstat/NRK | 20–27 Aug 2025 | 799 | 40; 19 | 31; 16 | 12; 3 | 4; 1 | 5; 0 | 4; 0 | – 0 | 1; 0 | 3; 0 | 9 |
| Norstat/NRK | 9–19 Jul 2025 | 986 | 38 | 35 | 13 | 3 | 1 | 3 | – | 2 | 5 | 3 |
| Norstat/NRK | 24 Feb–1 Mar 2025 | 1,001 | 36.4 | 34.9 | 15.8 | 3.7 | 0.9 | 3.9 | 0.9 | – | 3.6 | 1.5 |
| Norstat/NRK | 29 Oct–6 Nov 2024 | 1,000 | 33 | 38 | 13 | 2 | 3 | 6 | 6 | 2 | 2 | 5 |
| 2021 election | 13 Sep 2021 | —N/a | 31.9; 17 | 18.3; 9 | 15.0; 7 | 9.6; 3 | 5.6; 1 | 4.8; 1 | 4.3; 0 | 2.4; 1 | 8.2; 0 | 13.6 |

== Results ==
| Party | Votes | % | Seats | +/– |
|---|---|---|---|---|
| Norwegian Sámi Association | 7,064 | 38.01 | 18 | +1 |
| Nordkalottfolket | 5,927 | 31.89 | 15 | +6 |
| Labour Party | 2,113 | 11.37 | 4 | –3 |
| Sámi People's Party | 891 | 4.79 | 1 | 0 |
| Progress Party | 725 | 3.90 | 0 | –1 |
| Centre Party | 714 | 3.84 | 0 | –3 |
| Conservative Party | 523 | 2.81 | 0 | 0 |
| Ávjovári Moving Sámi List | 443 | 2.38 | 1 | 0 |
| Industry and Business Party | 75 | 0.40 | 0 | New |
| People's Federation of the Saami | 58 | 0.31 | 0 | 0 |
| Sameland List | 52 | 0.28 | 0 | New |
| Total | 18,585 | 100.00 | 39 | 0 |
| Valid votes | 18,585 | 98.23 | | |
| Invalid/blank votes | 334 | 1.77 | | |
| Total votes | 18,919 | 100.00 | | |
| Registered voters/turnout | 25,690 | 73.64 | | |
Source: valgresultat.no

== Aftermath ==
=== Council formation ===
Weeks after the election, the NSR entered negotiations with the Labour Party and Sámi People's Party in forming a majority council, but Labour withdrew from negotiations shortly afterwards over disagreements on the electrification of Melkøya and an ultimatum to the NSR to drop their lawsuit against the state over the matter. The NSR then sought to form a majority council with the Sámi People's Party and the Ávjovári Moving Sámi List. The parties reached an agreement by early October, ensuring that Silje Karine Muotka could continue as president of the Sámi Parliament. Muotka presented her new council on 13 October.

== See also ==
- 2025 Norwegian parliamentary election
