= 2001 Norwegian Sámi parliamentary election =

The 2001 Sami parliamentary election was held in Norway on 10 September 2001. Voters elected 39 members for the Sami Parliament of Norway.

== Results ==
Election results for the 2001 Sami parliamentary election. Voter turnout was 66.2%.

Party	Votes	%	Seats	+/–
Norwegian Sámi Association	2,036	30.99	14	−5
Labour Party	1,727	26.29	13	+1
Centre Party	597	9.09	3	+1
Sámi Electoral Association	430	6.54	2	−1
Kautokeino Reindeer Herders List	300	4.57	1	0
Sámi People's Party	248	3.77	1	−
Non-Reindeer Herders List	182	2.77	1	0
Conservative Party	176	2.68	1	+1
Sámi Residents in Southern Norway	130	1.98	1	–
Christian Democratic Party	129	1.96	0	−
Sámi Electoral Association and Sami Democrats	109	1.66	0	0
Liberal Party	102	1.55	0	0
South Sápmi list	93	1.42	1	−
Gaske-Dajvesne	86	1.31	0	−
Havlandets liste	64	0.97	0	–
Kárásjoga Badjeolbmuid Listu	56	0.85	0	–
Midtre Nordland Sijdda	52	0.79	1	0
Nord-Salten joint list	45	0.68	0	–
Coastal Party	8	0.12	0	−
Total	6,570	100.00	39	0

== See also ==
- 2001 Norwegian parliamentary election
