= Berit Marie Eira =

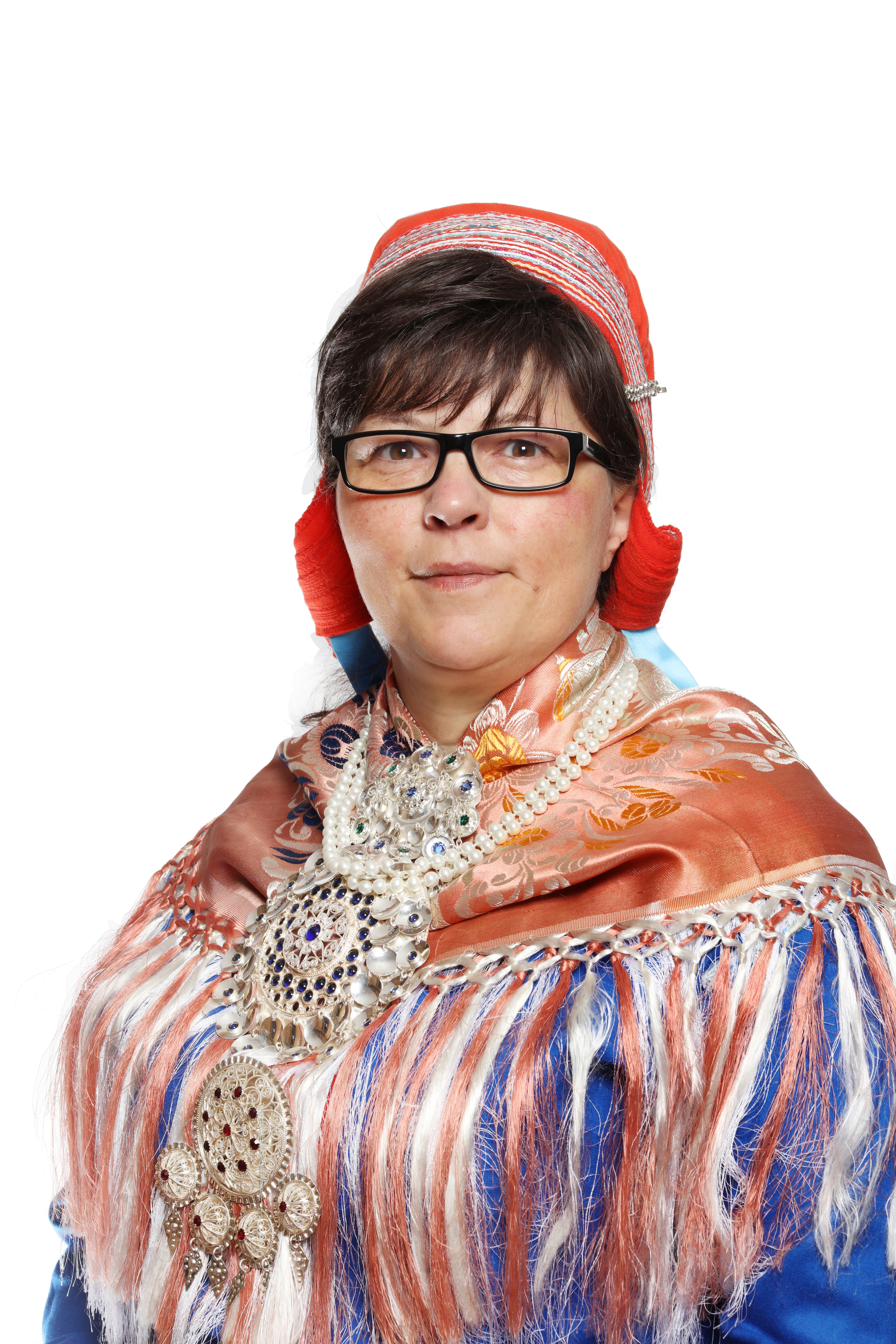
Berit Marie P E Eira (2017)

Berit Marie Eira (born 6 March 1968) is a Norwegian Sami reindeer owner and politician who works in Kautokeino Municipality. She represents the "Reindeer herder's list" party.

== Biography ==
Berit Marie Persdtr Eira was born 6 March 1968. She studied commerce and economics, receiving a 3-year bachelor's degree in reindeer husbandry.

In 2014, Eira highlighted her opposition to the Norwegian government's reindeer husbandry policy, as she refused to accept the demand to reduce the herd flock despite the state's threats of coercive fines.

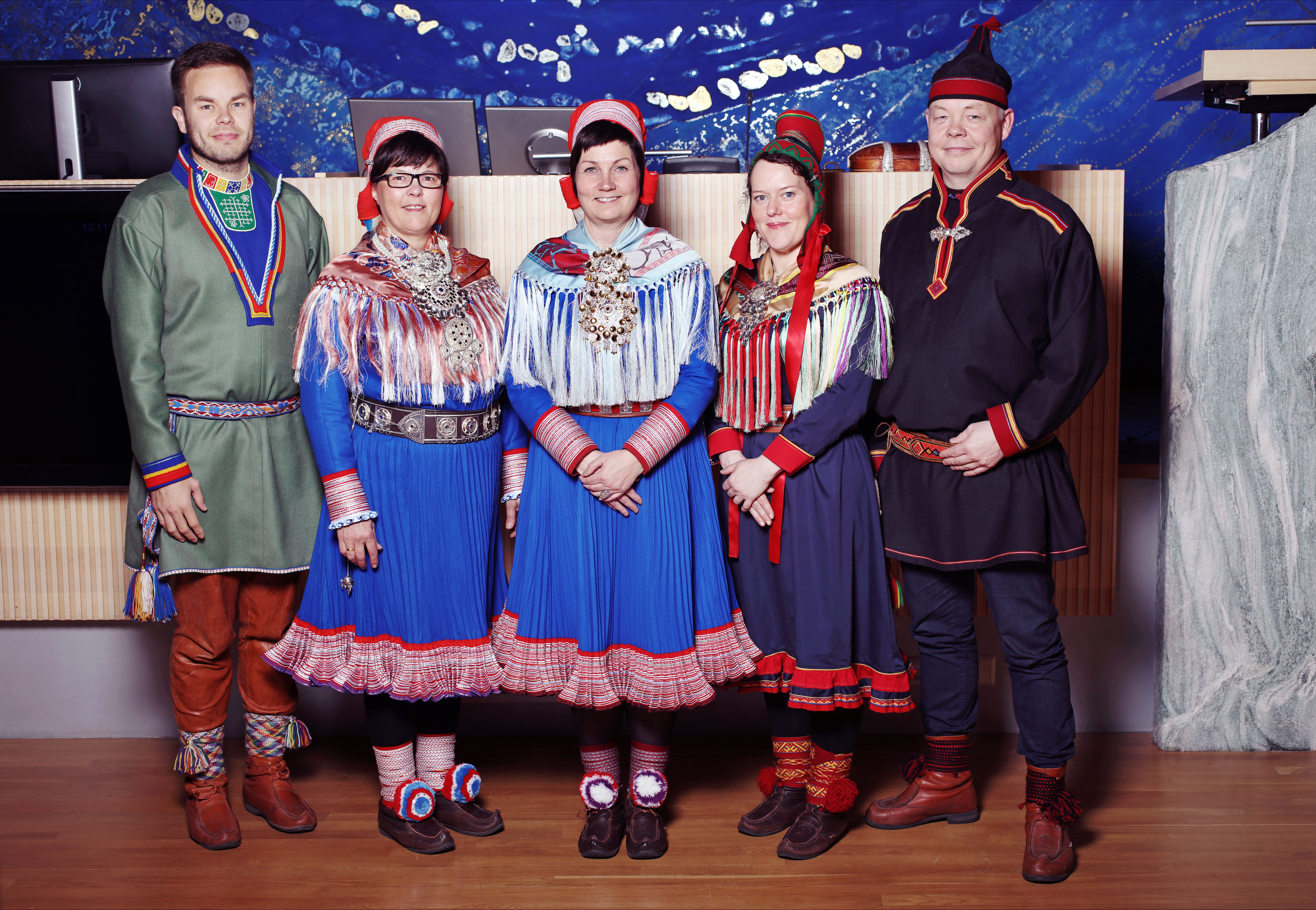
Governing Council of the Sami Parliament of Norway 2017 (Eire is second from the left)

In 2017, as the first representative from the Flyttsamelista, she became a member of the Sámi Parliament of Norway. This happened after the Sami election, when the four parties of the Norwegian Sámi Association, the Center Party, Åarjel-Saemiej Gielh, and the Flyttsamelista joined forces to create a 'majority government'. According to the agreement, Eira is in the council for the first two years of the parliamentary term, and Ellinor Jåma of Åarjel-Saemiej Gielh for the last two.

== See also ==
- Keskitalo's Third Council
