= Silje Karine Muotka =

Norwegian Sámi politician (born 1975)

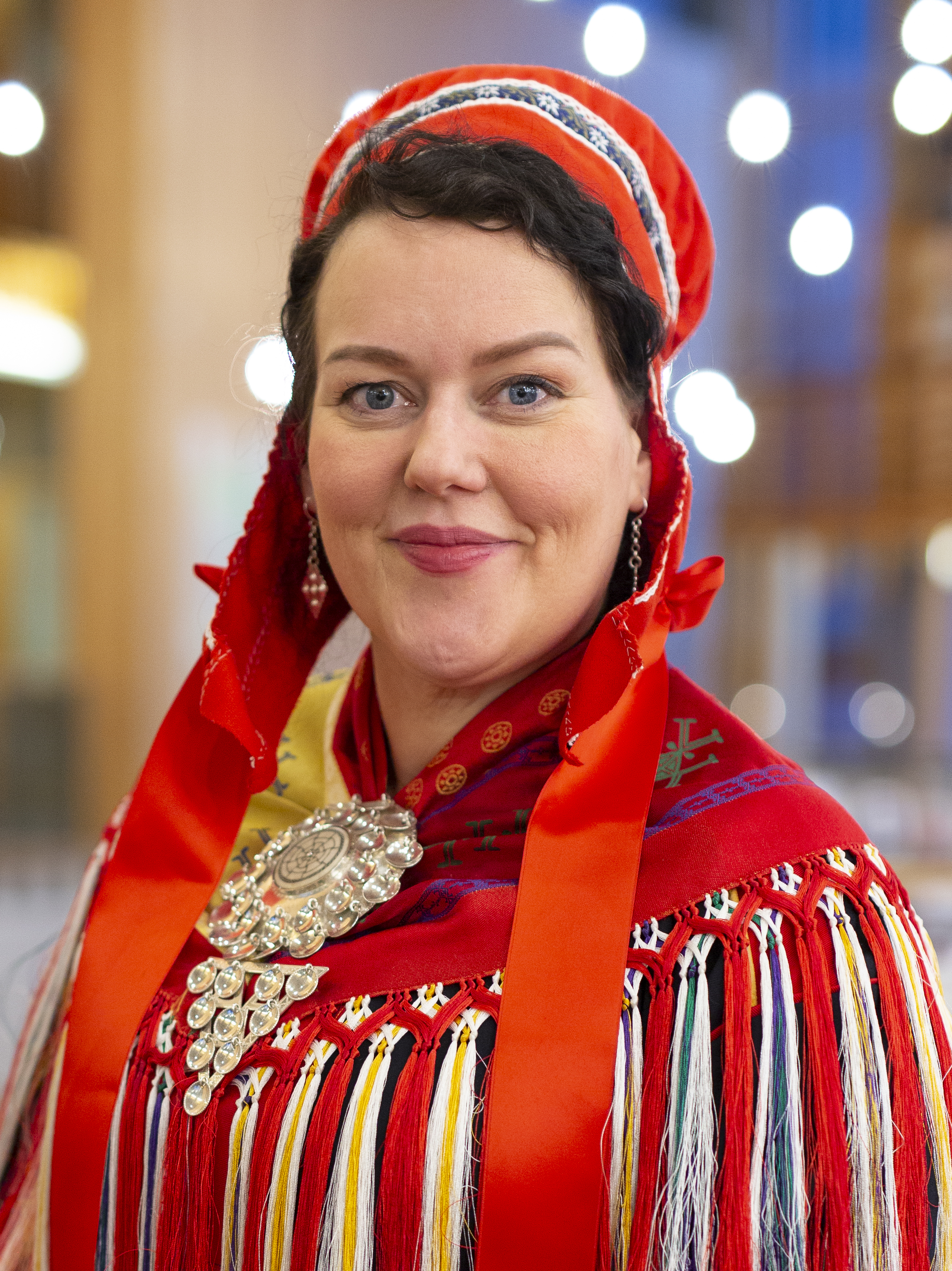
- Official portrait, 2020

President of the Sámi Parliament of Norway
- Incumbent
- Assumed office 21 October 2021
- Preceded by: Aili Keskitalo

Councillor for Environment, Industry, and Developmental Issues
- In office 12 October 2017 – 21 October 2021
- President: Aili Keskitalo

Member of the Governing Council
- In office 16 October 2013 – 8 December 2016

Member of the Sámi Parliament of Norway
- Incumbent
- Assumed office 2016
- In office 2009–2013

Personal details
- Born: 12 April 1975 (age 51) Unjárga, Finnmark, Norway
- Party: Norwegian Sámi Association

Silje Karine Muotka (born 12 April 1975) is a Norwegian Sámi politician from Unjárga Municipality who lives in Alta Municipality, Norway. She is the current president of the Sámi Parliament of Norway and was formerly a member of the Sámi Parliament's executive council.

== Education ==
Muotka has been involved in Sámi politics and activism since her youth, and she has worked with Sámi organizations since the 1990s. She studied law and culture at the University of Tromsø - The Arctic University of Norway, and administration and leadership at the Bodø Graduate School of Business. She works at the University of Tromsø.

== Political career ==
=== Sámi Parliament ===
From 1993 to 1997 she served as a substitute member in the Sámi Parliament, and in 1996 she was named to a working group on Sámi youth. From 1997 to 2000 she served as a substitute for the leader of the Sámi cultural council. From 2006 to 2008 she served as president of the Norwegian Sámi Association (NSR). In 2009 she was elected as a regular member of the Sámi Parliament, representing the Nordre electoral district for the NSR. She chaired the Child Development, Care, and Education Committee and sat on the Control Committee. In 2013, she was re-elected and joined the executive council, with Inger Elin Utsi taking her place as substitute member of parliament. She served in the executive council until 2016, after which she resumed her duties as member of parliament.

=== President of the Norwegian Sámi Parliament ===
Following the 2021 election, she became president of the Sámi Parliament. She was re-elected following the 2025 election, now leading a council consisting of the NSR, Sámi People's Party and the Ávjovári Moving Sámi List.

After a year in office, she criticised the government's proposal for the 2023 state budget, which included a 4% increase for the Sámi Parliament, which in reality were cuts in means for it. The Sámi Parliament's budget chief, Runar Myrnes Balto, went further and called the cuts "discriminating".
