= Elections in Norway =

Norway elects its legislature on a national level. The parliament, the Storting (or Stortinget by Norwegian grammar), has 169 members elected for a four-year term (during which it may not be dissolved) by a form of proportional representation in multi-seat constituencies.

Norway has a multi-party system, with numerous parties in which no one party tends to have a chance of gaining power alone, and parties must work with each other to form coalition governments or minority cabinets.

In Norway, elections are held every second year, alternating between elections for the Parliament and local elections, both of which are held every four years.

Suffrage is universal from the year a person turns 18 years old, even if the person turns 18 later in the year the election is held. Only Norwegian citizens can vote in the Parliamentary elections, but foreigners who have lived in Norway for three years continuously can vote in the local elections. Women's suffrage was adopted in 1913.

The last elections were the 2023 local elections on 11 September. The last parliamentary election was the 2025 parliamentary election, on 8 September.

== Election system ==
Norway uses the same system in both local and national elections when it comes to distributing mandates. This method is the modified Sainte-Laguë method and the underlying principle is that the number of seats a party gets in the Storting should be as close as possible to the relative number of votes the party got in the election.

There are some exceptions to the above-mentioned principle:

1. Leveling seats: These seats exist to resolve situations in which a party receives significant support, but not enough in any single constituency to ordinarily win a seat. A party must earn more than 4% of the total votes – the election threshold – to be entitled to levelling seats.
2. Rural overrepresentation: Rural, sparsely populated constituencies get more seats than the population would otherwise dictate. This is to maintain a representative feeling in assemblies and to prevent the preferences of urban areas always overruling those of rural areas. However, this has been criticised by the OSCE, among others, as being unfair.
3. Many parties, but few seats: All of the nine parties represented in the Storting (Red Party (R), Socialist Left Party (SV), Green Party (Norway) (MDG), Labour Party (Ap), Centre Party (Sp), Venstre (V), Christian People's Party (KrF), Conservative Party (H), Progress Party (FrP)) run lists of candidates in all 19 counties. There are also many minor parties that run in some, but not all, constituencies. These parties all compete for the same seats, and in constituencies with few seats, only a few parties win representation. This is partially offset by levelling seats, but only for parties above the election threshold.

Unlike most parliaments, the Storting always serves its full four-year term; the constitution does not allow snap elections, nor does it give the monarch the right to dissolve parliament even if the government wants to do so. By-elections are not used, as the list-system means that vacant seats are merely filled by the next one on the party list (suppleants). This is also the case when candidates take temporary leave due to illness, childbirth etc.

Norway switched its parliamentary elections from single-member districts decided by two-round run-offs to multi-member districts with proportional representation in 1919.

== Voting ==
High voter turnout is generally seen as beneficial by all parties, and the voting process has been streamlined in order to encourage voting. Registration is automatic and based on the national registry.

=== Ballots ===
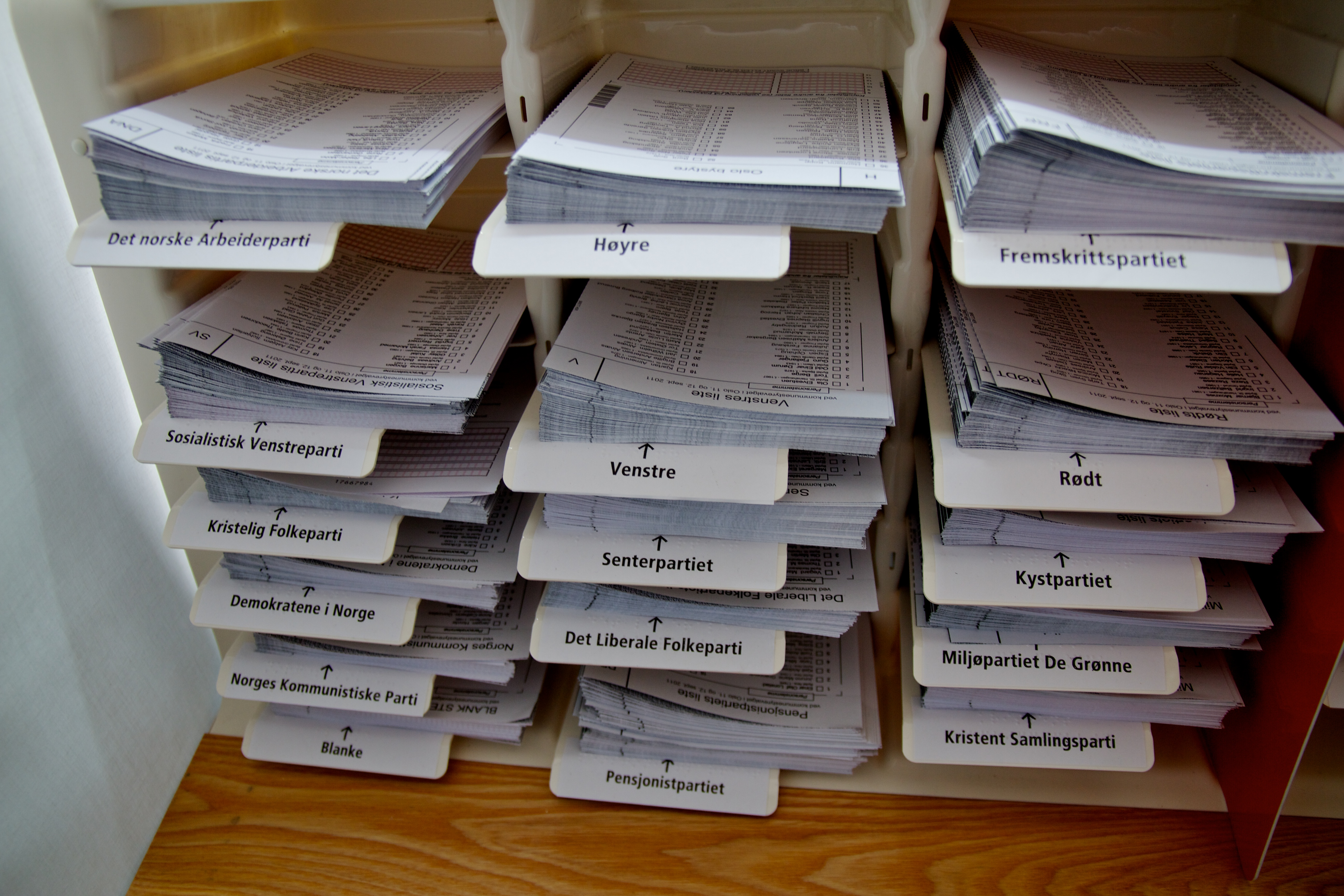
Ballots in a voting booth

The ballots are uniform throughout the country, with the exception of the candidate list. Each ballot will contain the name of a party, and also a list of the candidates promoted by that party in order of priority. Voters may assign personal choices among those candidates by checking a box next to the candidates name (thus changing the priority). Voters may also write in names from other lists if they so desire.

The ballot is in the form of an A4 sheet of paper folded in two (e.g. an A5 folder). The ballots are identical for all parties/lists in a given election. The inside of the ballot has the name of the party/list and the list of candidates. The outside of the ballot has a field for the election official to stamp the ballot as correctly received immediately prior to the voter casting the ballot in the ballotbox.

The ballots are located inside each voting booth. Election officials are tasked with keeping the number of ballots in each voting booth approximately even, to reduce the possibility of influencing the voter.

In the case of national elections, there is only one group of ballots to choose from. In the case of local elections, there is two groups of ballots, one for the County-level elections, and one for the municipality-level elections.

=== Procedure ===
1. The voter first selects the ballot corresponding to the party/list he/she wants to cast a ballot in favor of.
2. The voter then proceeds to change/amend the lists if desired.
3. The voter then folds the ballot along a marked line, to ensure that no one can see which ballot he/she has chosen.
4. The voter proceeds to an election official, identifies himself, is checked towards the voting registry, and gets the ballots stamped.
5. The voter then casts the ballot in the ballot-box, one per election.

=== Early voting ===
Early voting can happen in any early polling place in the country, usually starting in July and ending about a week before election day. Voters wishing to vote early can search for polling places on the public website www.valglokaler.no. Early polling places are usually at City Halls or similar public buildings. Larger cities such as Oslo also deploy mobile early polling places in places such as large public transport hubs, metro stations etc. Voters are required to identify themselves before voting.

Voters submitting an early vote in another district/municipality than their own, will be given a ballot without a candidate list. The ballot will then be enclosed in an envelope with the name of his/her home district. The voter will then proceed to deliver the ballot to the sealed ballot box. The ballot will be mailed by to the correct district/municipality in advance of election day.

Voters may not change their ballot after submitting an early ballot.

=== Voting from abroad ===
Voters staying abroad can vote at Norwegian embassies and consulates.

Voters abroad who are not close to any Norwegian foreign station can vote through mail. They can request ballots to be sent to them. Voters can also write their own ballots, as long as they follow a few simple rules.

=== Election day ===
Election day is normally the 2nd Monday of September, but many polling places are also open the preceding Sunday. Election day is not a public holiday. Voters may only vote in their own municipality on election day. Polling places are usually local schools, community centers or similar, and are normally open from 09:00 or 12:00. All polling places close at 20:00 across the country.

== Parliamentary elections ==
=== Constituencies and seat distribution ===
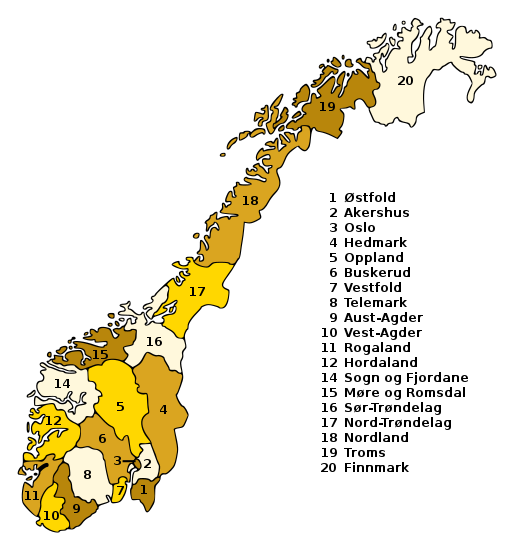
Electoral districts of Norway

Norway was up until 2018, divided into 19 counties, and since then, each of the former counties is a constituency in the election. Each constituency elects a pre-calculated number of seats in the Parliament, the Storting, based on the population and geographical area of the constituency. Each inhabitant scores one point and each square kilometer scores 1.8 points. This calculation is done every eight years. This practice has been criticized because in some larger counties with sparse population a single vote counts more than in other more densely populated counties. Others claim that counties with a scattered and sparse population situated far away from the central administration should have a stronger representation in the Parliament. In recent elections a vote in the northernmost county Finnmark has counted approximately twice a vote in the capital Oslo or the surrounding county Akershus.

Norwegian citizens living in Svalbard and Jan Mayen, as well as Norwegian citizens living abroad who have resided in Norway within the past ten years, are registered to vote in the constituency they last resided in.

After the votes are counted and the members of the Parliament are designated their respective seats of their county, 19 leveling seats, one in each county, are divided to parties who got fewer seats than their election result percentage would suggest. This practice was adopted in 1989. However, only parties with more than 4% of the votes on a national basis – the election threshold – are entitled to leveling seats.

For the 2021 election the distribution of seats, including levelling seats, is as follows:

| County | Seats |
|---|---|
| Akershus | 19 |
| Aust-Agder | 4 |
| Buskerud | 8 |
| Finnmark | 5 |
| Hedmark | 7 |
| Hordaland | 16 |
| Møre og Romsdal | 8 |
| Nordland | 9 |
| Nord-Trøndelag | 5 |
| Oppland | 6 |
| Oslo | 20 |
| Rogaland | 14 |
| Sogn og Fjordane | 4 |
| Sør-Trøndelag | 10 |
| Telemark | 6 |
| Troms | 6 |
| Vest-Agder | 6 |
| Vestfold | 7 |
| Østfold | 9 |
| Total | 169 |

== Local elections ==
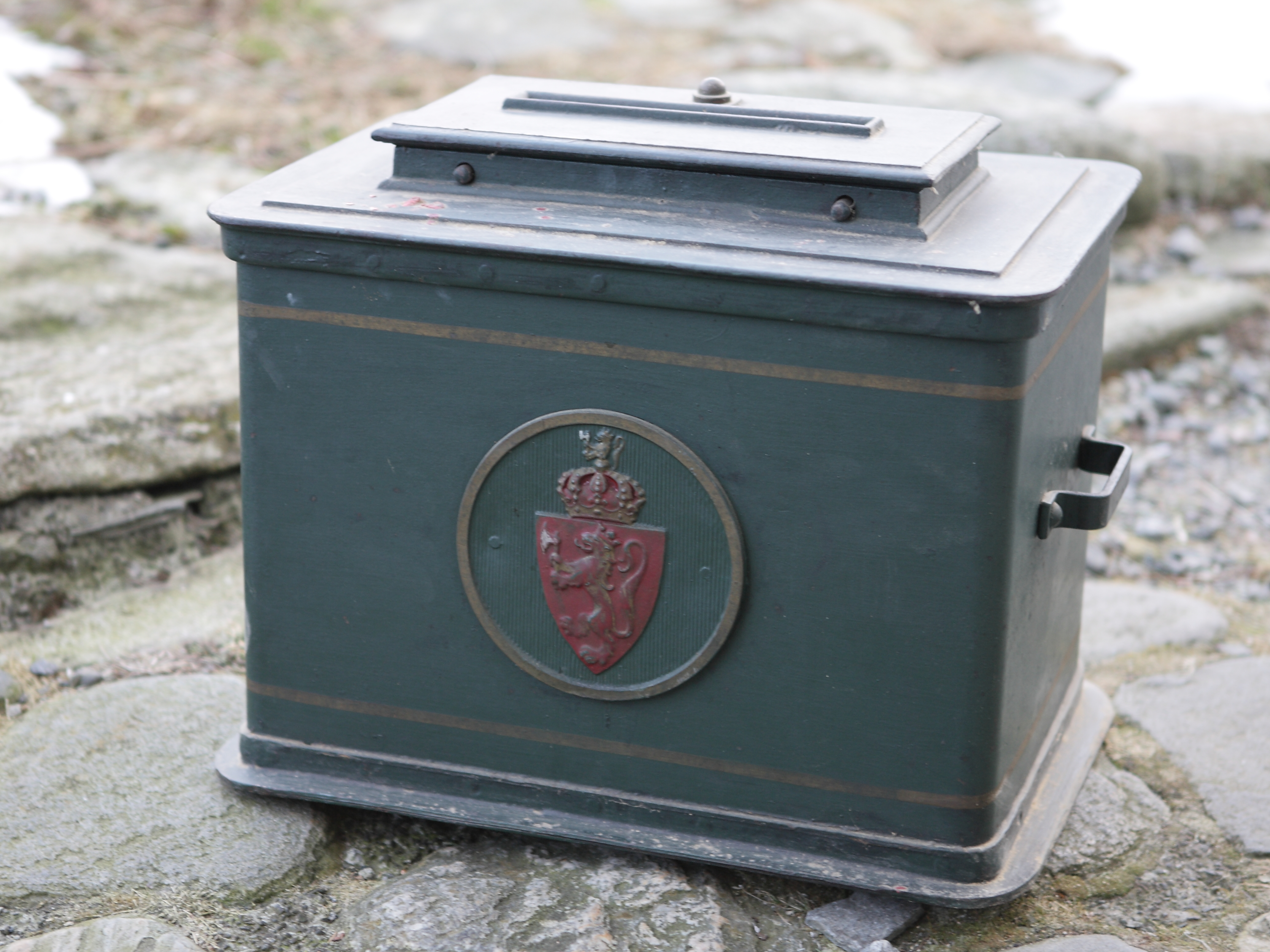
Old ballot box from Selje Municipality, Sogn og Fjordane, Norway

The local elections are two separate elections held at the same time. The first is the county election, which elects politicians to the county council. Second is the municipality election, which elects politicians to the municipal councils.

== Sámi Parliament election ==
People of Sámi heritage, included in the Sámi Parliament's electoral roll, are eligible to vote to the Sami Parliament of Norway. For the election Norway is divided into 13 constituencies from which 3 representatives are elected. In addition an additional representative is elected from the four constituencies with most votes. The election is held at the same time as the elections to the Norwegian Parliament.

== Referendums ==
- Norwegian referendum on the dissolution of the union between Sweden and Norway, 1905
- Norwegian referendum on Prince Carl of Denmark as Norwegian King, 1905
- 1919 Norwegian Prohibition referendum
- 1926 Norwegian continued prohibition referendum
- 1972 Norwegian European Communities membership referendum
- 1994 Norwegian European Union membership referendum
