= Sámi Parliament of Norway =

Elected political body for the Sámi people in Norway

Coordinates: 69°28′15″N 25°29′46″E

Sámi Parliament in Norway: Sámediggi (Northern Sami); Sámedigge (Lule Sami); Sámedigge (Pite Sami); Sámiediggie (Ume Sami); Saemiedigkie (Southern Sami); Sääʹmteʹǧǧ (Skolt Sami); Sametinget (Norwegian)
- 10th Sámi Parliament

Type
- Type: Unicameral

History
- Founded: 9 October 1989
- Preceded by: Norwegian Sámi Council

Leadership
- Speaker: Sandra Márjá West, NSR since 16 October 2025
- Deputy speaker: Knut Hærulf Wingstad, NKF
- President of the Sámi Parliament: Silje Karine Muotka, NSR since 21 October 2021

Structure
- Seats: 39
- Political groups: Governing Council (20): Norwegian Sámi Association (18); Sámi People's Party (1); Ávjovári Moving Sámi List (1); Opposition (19): Nordkalottfolket (15); Labour Party (4)

Elections
- Voting system: Open list proportional representation Modified Sainte-Laguë method
- Last election: 8 September 2025
- Next election: 2029

Meeting place
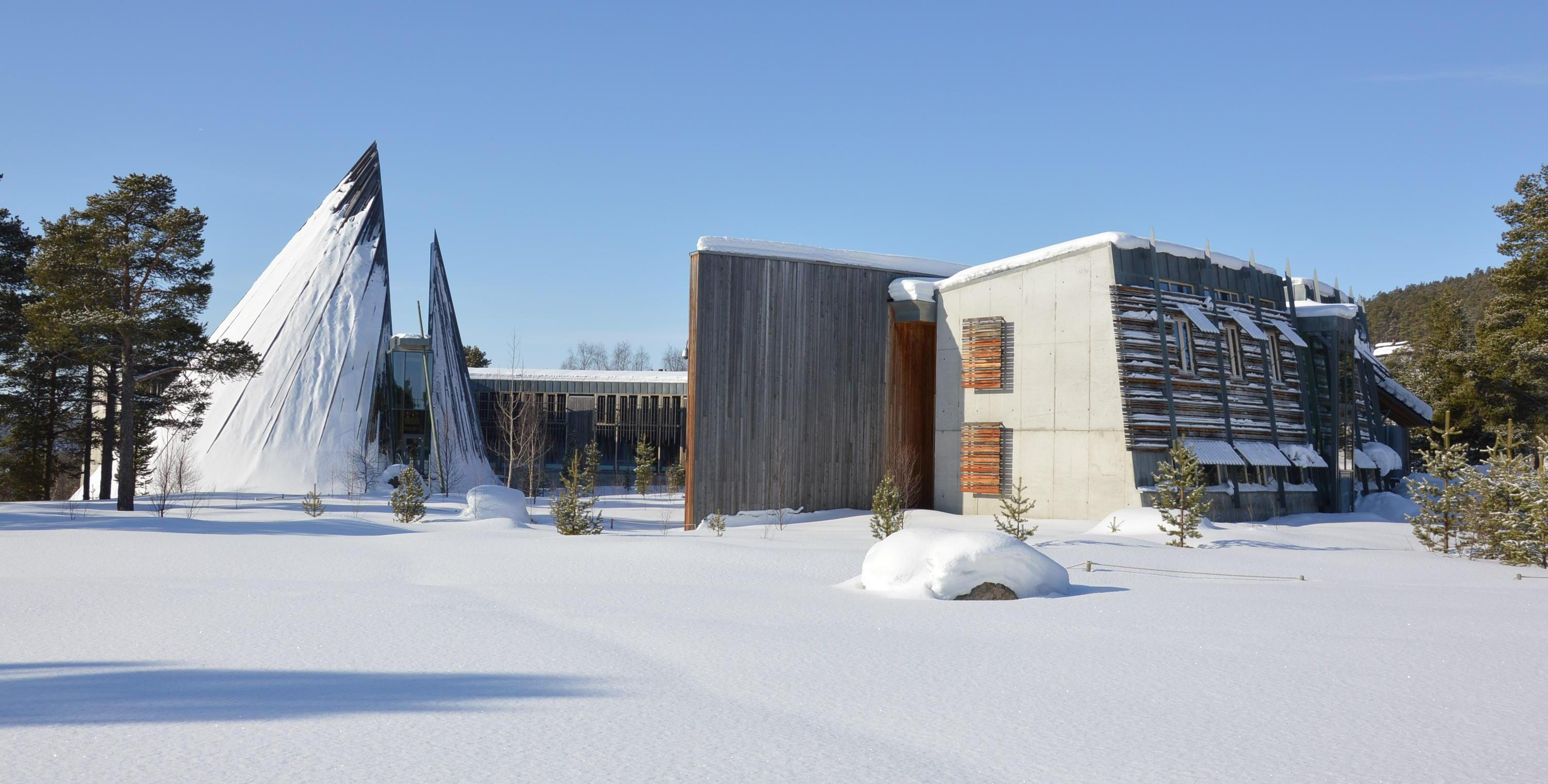
- Sámi Parliament of Norway Building; Karasjok, Norway

Website
- www.sametinget.no

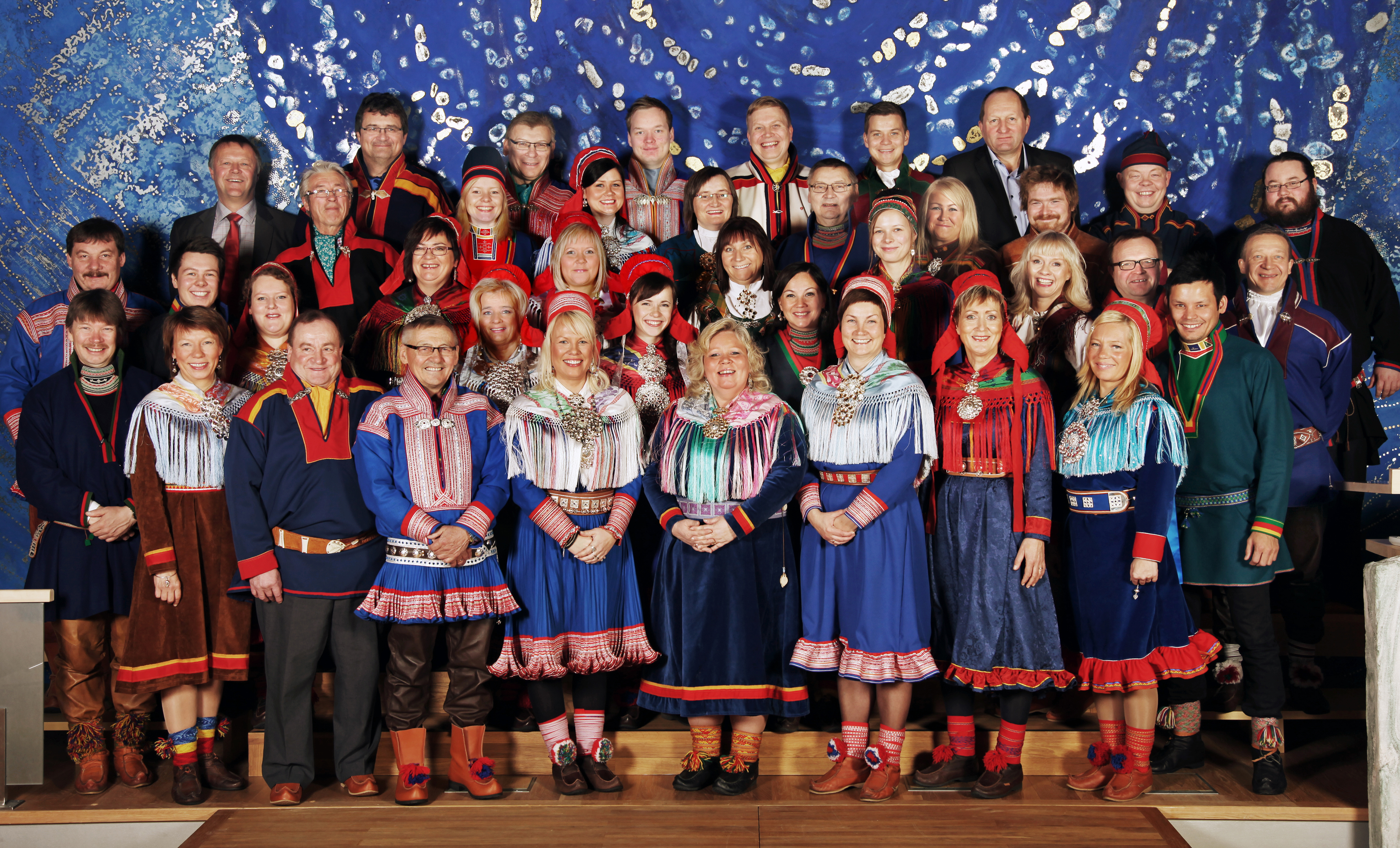
Plenary 2013–17

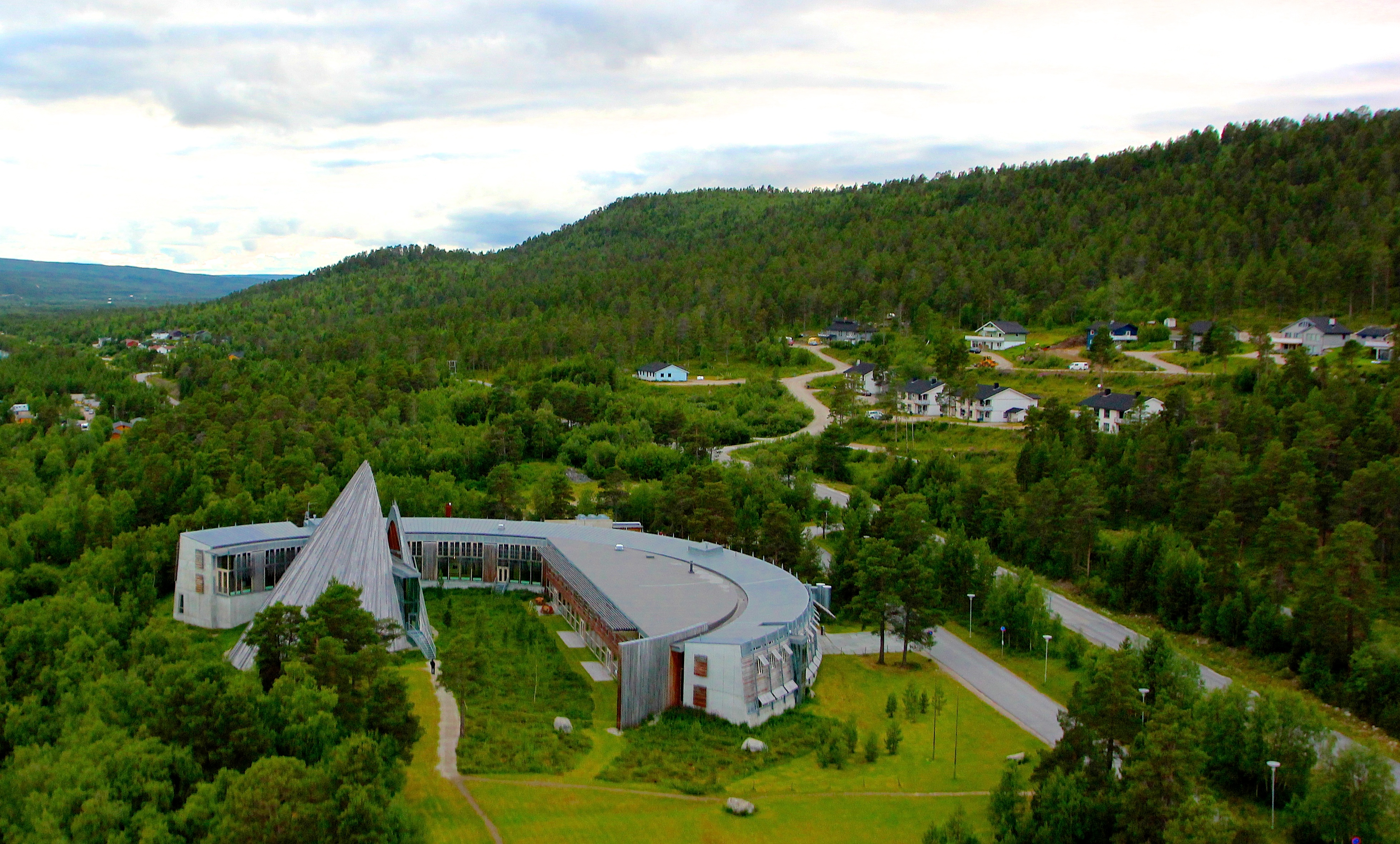
Aerial photo of the parliament

The Sámi Parliament of Norway (Norwegian: Sametinget, Northern Sami: Sámediggi [ˈsaːmeˌtiɡːiː], Lule Sámi and Pite Sami: Sámedigge, Ume Sami: Sámiediggie, Southern Sami: Saemiedigkie, Skolt Sami: Sääʹmteʹǧǧ) is the representative body for people of Sámi heritage in Norway. It acts as an institution of cultural autonomy for the Sámi people of Norway.

The parliament opened on 9 October 1989 and its seat is in the village of Kárášjohka (Karasjok) in Kárášjoga Municipality in Finnmark county. It currently has 39 representatives, who are elected every four years by direct vote from 7 constituencies. The last election was in 2025. Unlike the neighboring Sámi Parliament of Finland, the 7 constituencies cover the entire country. The current president is Silje Karine Muotka who represents the Norwegian Sámi Association.

== History ==
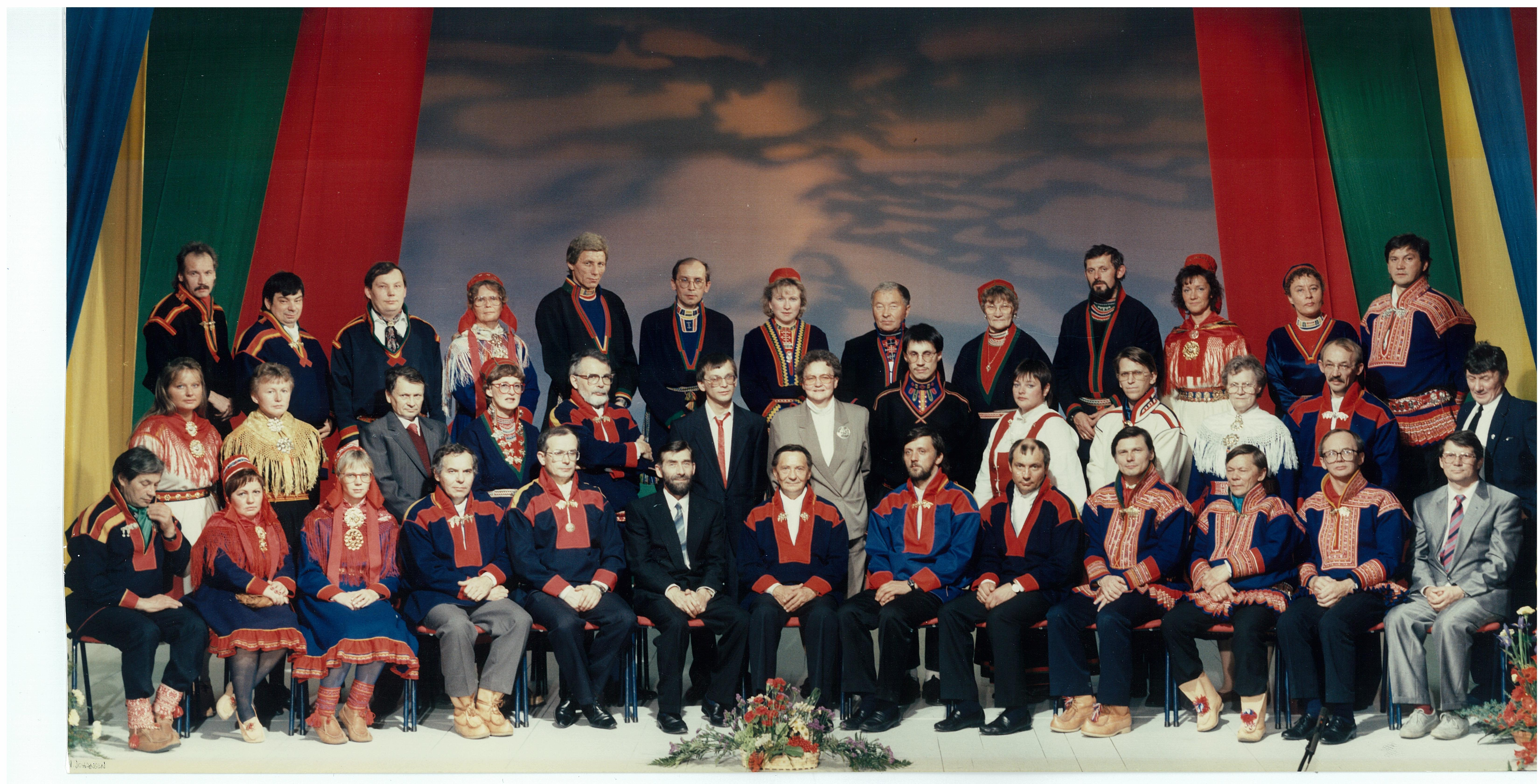
Plenary of the inaugural Sámi Parliament in 1989

In 1964, the Norwegian Sámi Council was established to address Sámi matters. The members of the body were appointed by state authorities. This body was replaced by the Sámi Parliament.

In 1978, the Norwegian Water Resources and Energy Directorate published a plan that called for the construction of a dam and hydroelectric power plant that would create an artificial lake and inundate the Sámi village of Máze. This plan was met by strong opposition from the Sámi, and resulted in the Alta controversy. As a result of the controversy, the Norwegian government held meetings in 1980 and 1981 with a Sámi delegation appointed by the Norwegian Sámi Association, the Sámi Reindeer Herders' Association of Norway and the Norwegian Sámi Council. The meetings resulted in the establishment of a committee to discuss Sámi cultural issues, and the Sámi Rights Committee addressing Sámi legal relations. The latter proposed a democratically elected body for the Sámi, resulting in the Sámi Act of 1987. In addition, the Sámi Rights Committee resulted in the 1988 amendment of the Norwegian Constitution, and the adoption of the Finnmark Act in 2005.

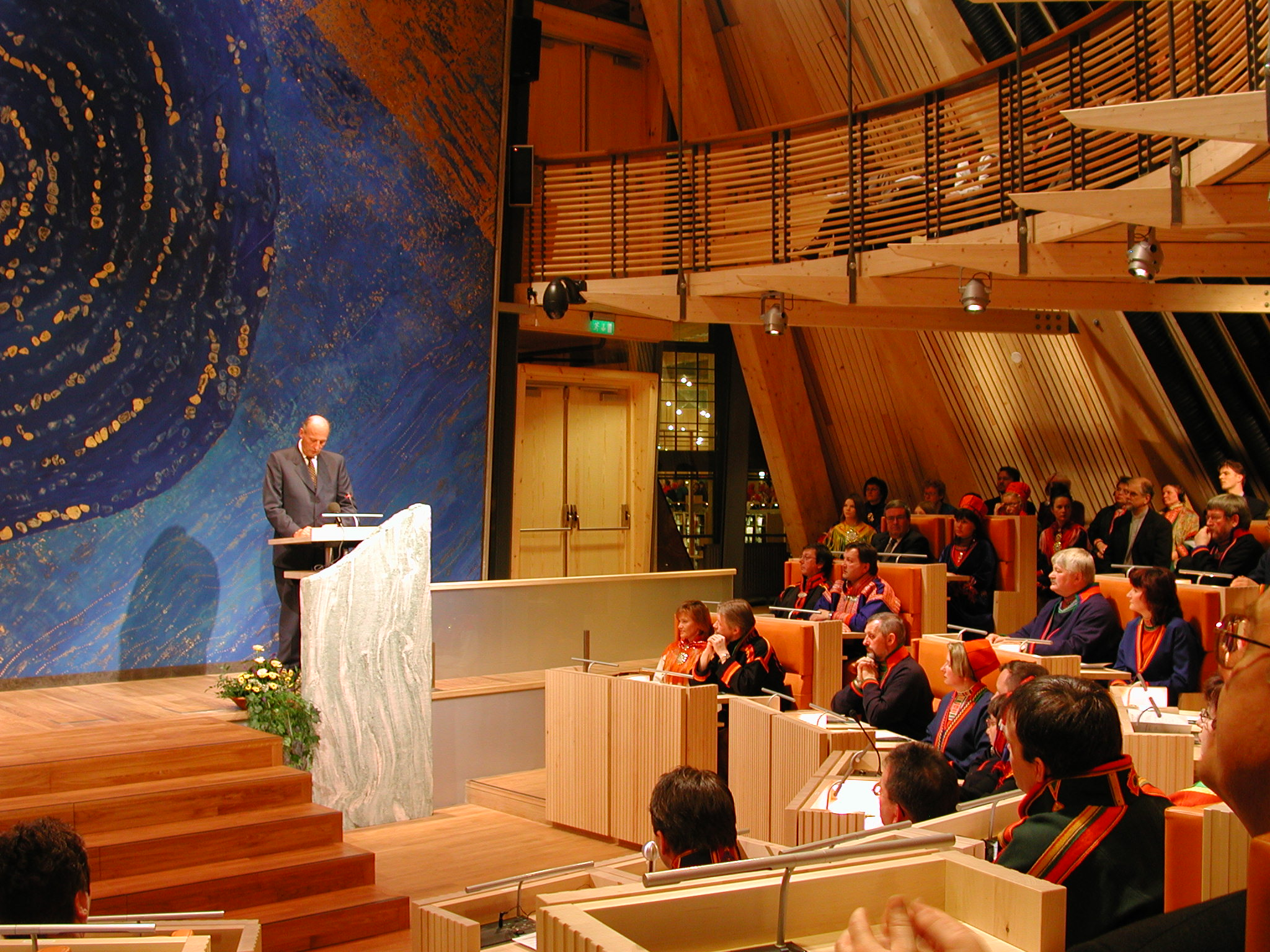
Harald V opening the new building in 2000

The Sámi Act (1987:56), stipulating the responsibilities and powers of the Norwegian Sámi Parliament, was passed by the Norwegian Parliament on 12 June 1987 and took effect on 24 February 1989. The first session of the Sámi Parliament was convened on 9 October 1989 and was opened by King Olav V.

== Organization ==
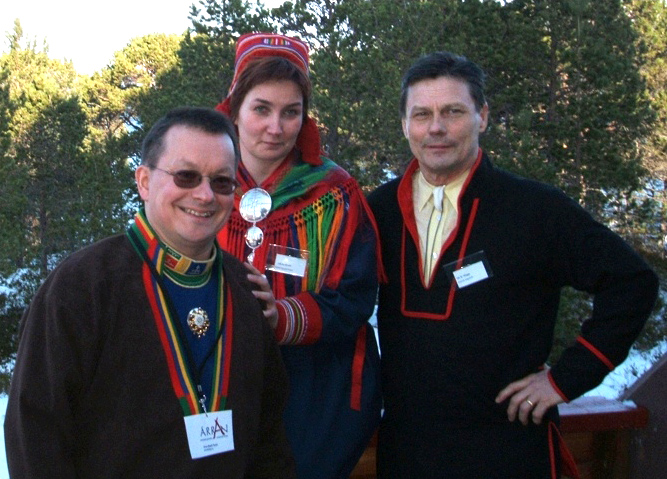
Sven-Roald Nystø, Aili Keskitalo and Ole Henrik Magga were the first three presidents

The Norwegian Sámi Parliament plenary (dievasčoahkkin) has 39 representatives elected by direct vote from 7 constituencies. The plenary is the highest body in the Sámi Parliament and it is sovereign in the execution of the Sámi Parliaments duties within the framework of the Sámi Act. The representatives from the largest party (or from a collaboration of parties) form a governing council (Sámediggeráđđi), and selects a president. Although the position of vice-president was formally removed from the Sámi Parliament's Rules of Procedure in 2013, it is considered the concern of the president of the Sámi Parliament whether he or she wants to appoint a vice-president. The governing council is responsible for executing the roles and responsibilities of the parliament between plenary meetings. In addition there are multiple thematic committees addressing specific cases.

=== Presidents ===
	Name (Birth-Death)	Portrait	Elected	Took office	Left office	Political party	Council(s)
1	Ole Henrik Magga (1947–)		1989; 1993	9 October 1989	8 October 1997	Norwegian Sámi Association	Magga
2	Sven-Roald Nystø (1956–)		1997; 2001	8 October 1997	20 October 2005	Norwegian Sámi Association	Nystø
3	Aili Keskitalo (1968–)		2005	20 October 2005	26 September 2007	Norwegian Sámi Association	Keskitalo I NSR–Sp–SáB–JSL–SSN
4	Egil Olli (1949–)		– 2009	26 September 2007	16 October 2013	Labour Party	Olli I Ap
4	Egil Olli (1949–)		– 2009	26 September 2007	16 October 2013	Labour Party	Olli II; Ap–Árja–NKF–ÅAsG–SSN
5	Aili Keskitalo (1968–)		2013	16 October 2013	8 December 2016	Norwegian Sámi Association	Keskitalo II; NSR
6	Vibeke Larsen (1971–)		–	8 December 2016	12 October 2017	Labour Party	Larsen; Ap–H–Árja
	Vibeke Larsen (1971–)		–	8 December 2016	12 October 2017	Independent	Larsen; Ap–H–Árja
7	Aili Keskitalo (1968–)		2017	12 October 2017	21 October 2021	Norwegian Sámi Association	Keskitalo III; NSR–Sp–JSL–ÅAsG
8	Silje Karine Muotka (1975–)		2021; 2025	21 October 2021	Incumbent	Norwegian Sámi Association	Muotka I NSR–Sp–JSL
8	Silje Karine Muotka (1975–)		2021; 2025	21 October 2021	Incumbent	Norwegian Sámi Association	Muotka II; NSR–SáB–ÁDL

== Location ==
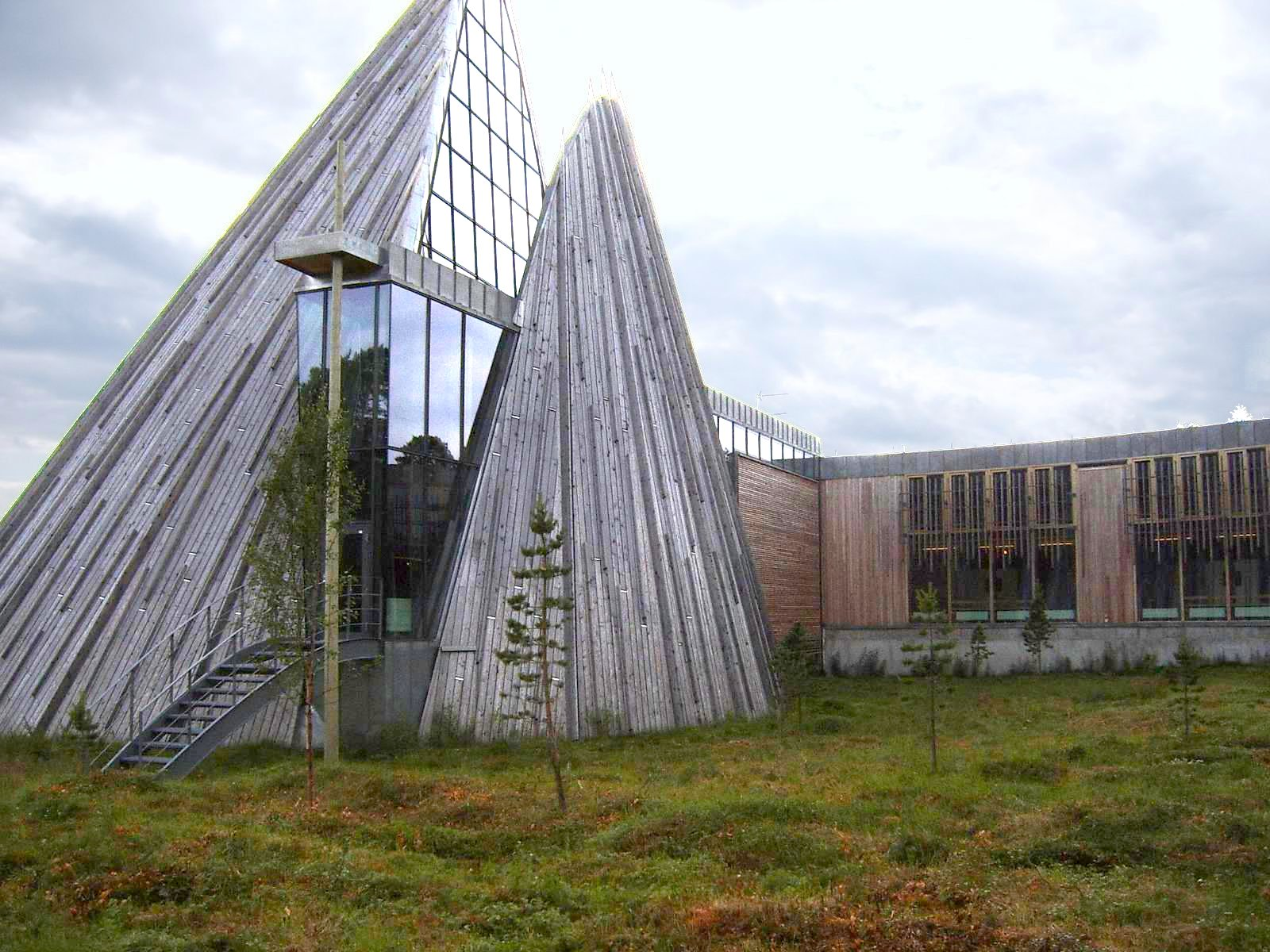
The Sámi Parliament building in Norway

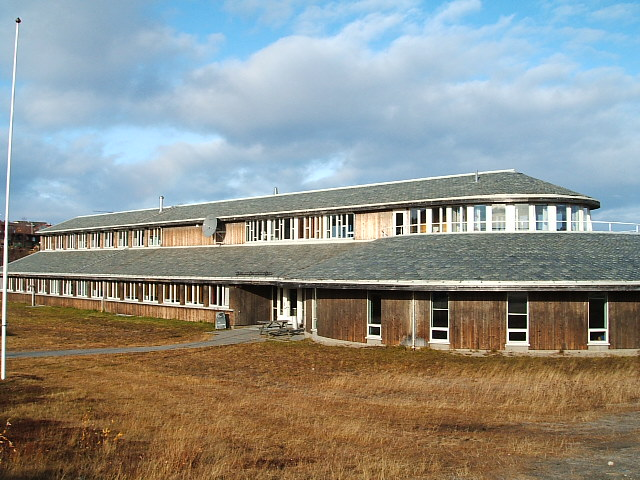
The Guovdageaidnu office of the Sámi Parliament of Norway

The Sámi Parliament of Norway is located in Karasjok (Kárášjohka), and the building was inaugurated on 2 November 2000. There are also offices in Guovdageaidnu (Kautokeino), Unjárga (Nesseby), Gáivuotna (Kåfjord), Romsa (Tromsø), Skánik (Evenskjær) Ájluokta (Drag), Aarborte (Hattfjelldal) and Snåase (Snåsa).

The town of Kárášjohka is considered an important center of Sámi culture in Norway. Approximately 80% of the town's population is Sámi-speaking, and the town also hosts Sámi broadcasting stations and several public and private Sámi institutions such as the Sámi Museum and the organization Sámi Trade and Industry.

== Building ==
The building was designed by the architects Stein Halvorsen and Christian Sundby, who won the Norwegian government's call for projects in 1995, and inaugurated in 2005. The government called for a building such that "the Sámi Parliament appears in a dignified way" and "reflects Sámi architecture." Hence the peaked structure of the Plenary Assembly Hall resembles the tipis the Sámi used as a nomadic culture. The parliament building also houses a Sámi library focusing on books in the Sámi language or on Sámi topics, and the Sámi chamber of commerce, Sámi Trade and Industry'.

== Responsibilities ==
The parliament works with political issues it considers relevant or of interest to the Sámi people. The responsibilities of the Sámi Parliament in Norway are: "(1) to serve as the Sámi's elected political body to promote political initiatives and (2) to carry out the administrative tasks delegated from national authorities or by law to the Sámi Parliament.".

The extent of responsibility that was assigned and transferred from the Norwegian government at the time of establishment was modest (1989). However, more responsibilities have been added including:

- Management of the Sámi Development Fund, which is used for grants to Sámi organizations and Sámi duodji (1989).
- Responsibility for the development of the Sámi language in Norway, including allocation of funds to Sámi language municipalities and counties (1992).
- Responsibility for Sámi culture, including a fund from the Norwegian Council for Cultural Affairs (1993).
- Protection of Sámi cultural heritage sites (1994).
- Development of Sámi teaching aids, including allocation of grants for this purpose (2000).
- Election of 50% of the members to the board in the Finnmark Estate (2006).

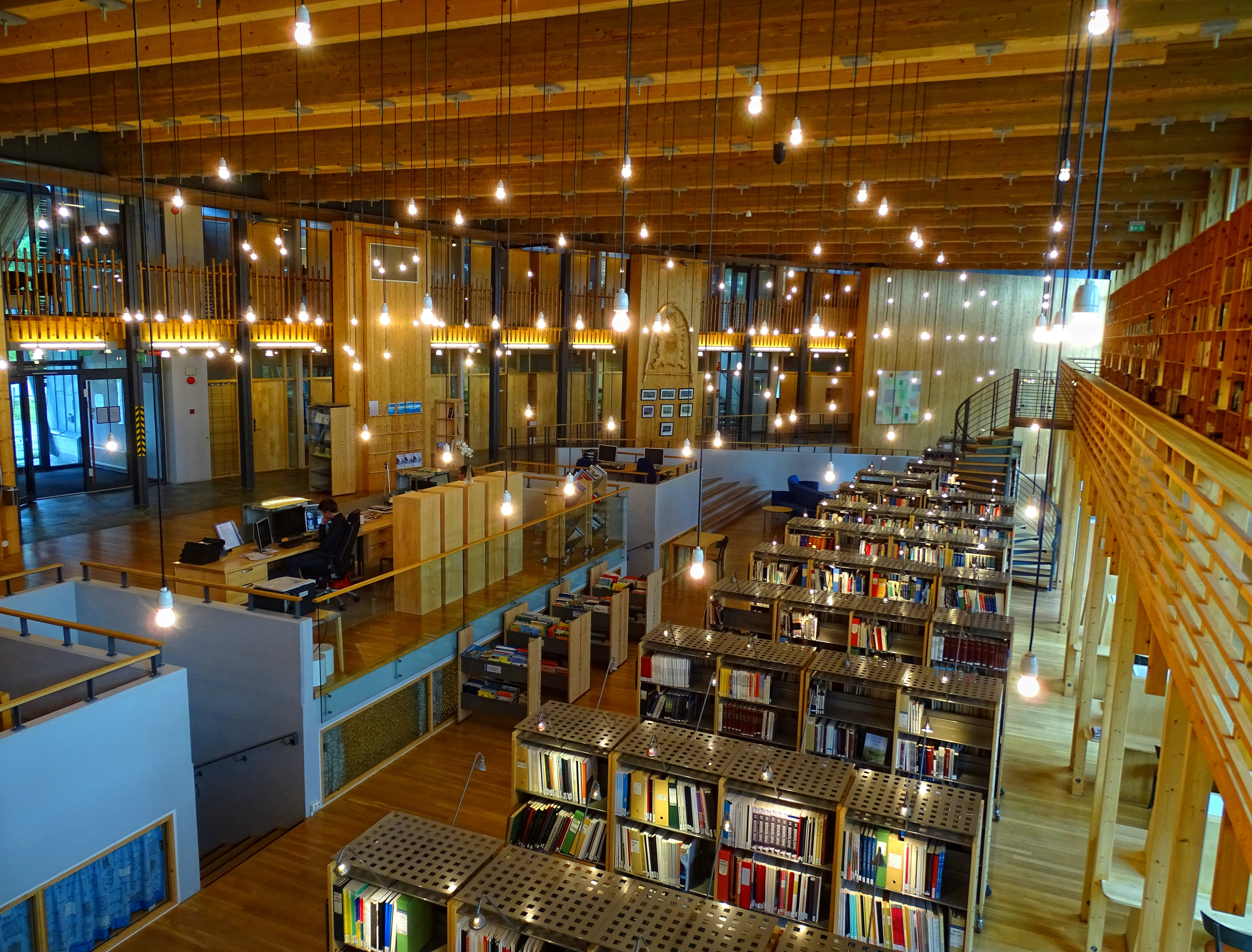
The library of the Sámi Parliament in Norway.

One of the responsibilities is ensuring that the section 1–5 of the Saami Act (1987:56) is upheld, i.e., that the Sámi languages and Norwegian continue to have the same status.

== Finances ==
=== Funding ===
Funding is granted by the Norwegian state over various national budget lines. But the parliament can distribute the received funds according to its own priorities. In the Norwegian government the main responsibility for Sámi affairs, including the allocation of funds, is the Ministry of Local government.

=== Salaries and other expenses ===
The president's salary is 80% of that of the members of the Norwegian cabinet. The salary of the other 4 members of the Sámediggeráđđi (governing council) is 75% of the president's salary. The speaker's salary is 80% of the president's.

== Elections ==
To be eligible to vote or be elected to the Norwegian Sámi Parliament a person needs to be included in the Sámi Parliament's electoral roll. In order to be included the following criteria must be met as stipulated in Section 2–6 of the Sámi Act: "Everyone who declares that they consider themselves to be Sámi, and who either has Sámi as their home language, or has or has had a parent, grandparent or great-grandparent with Sámi as their home language, or who is a child of someone who is or has been registered in the Sámi Parliament's electoral roll, has the right to be enrolled in the Electoral roll of the Sámi Parliament in the municipality of residence." Results of the last election:

Party	Votes	%	Seats	+/–
Norwegian Sámi Association	7,064	38.01	18	+1
Nordkalottfolket	5,927	31.89	15	+6
Labour Party	2,113	11.37	4	–3
Sámi People's Party	891	4.79	1	0
Progress Party	725	3.90	0	–1
Centre Party	714	3.84	0	–3
Conservative Party	523	2.81	0	0
Ávjovári Moving Sámi List	443	2.38	1	0
Industry and Business Party	75	0.40	0	New
People's Federation of the Saami	58	0.31	0	0
Sámi Language List	52	0.28	0	New
Total	18,585	100.00	39	0
Valid votes	18,585	98.23		
Invalid/blank votes	334	1.77		
Total votes	18,919	100.00		
Registered voters/turnout	25,690	73.64		
Source: valgresultat.no

== Cooperation with the state government ==
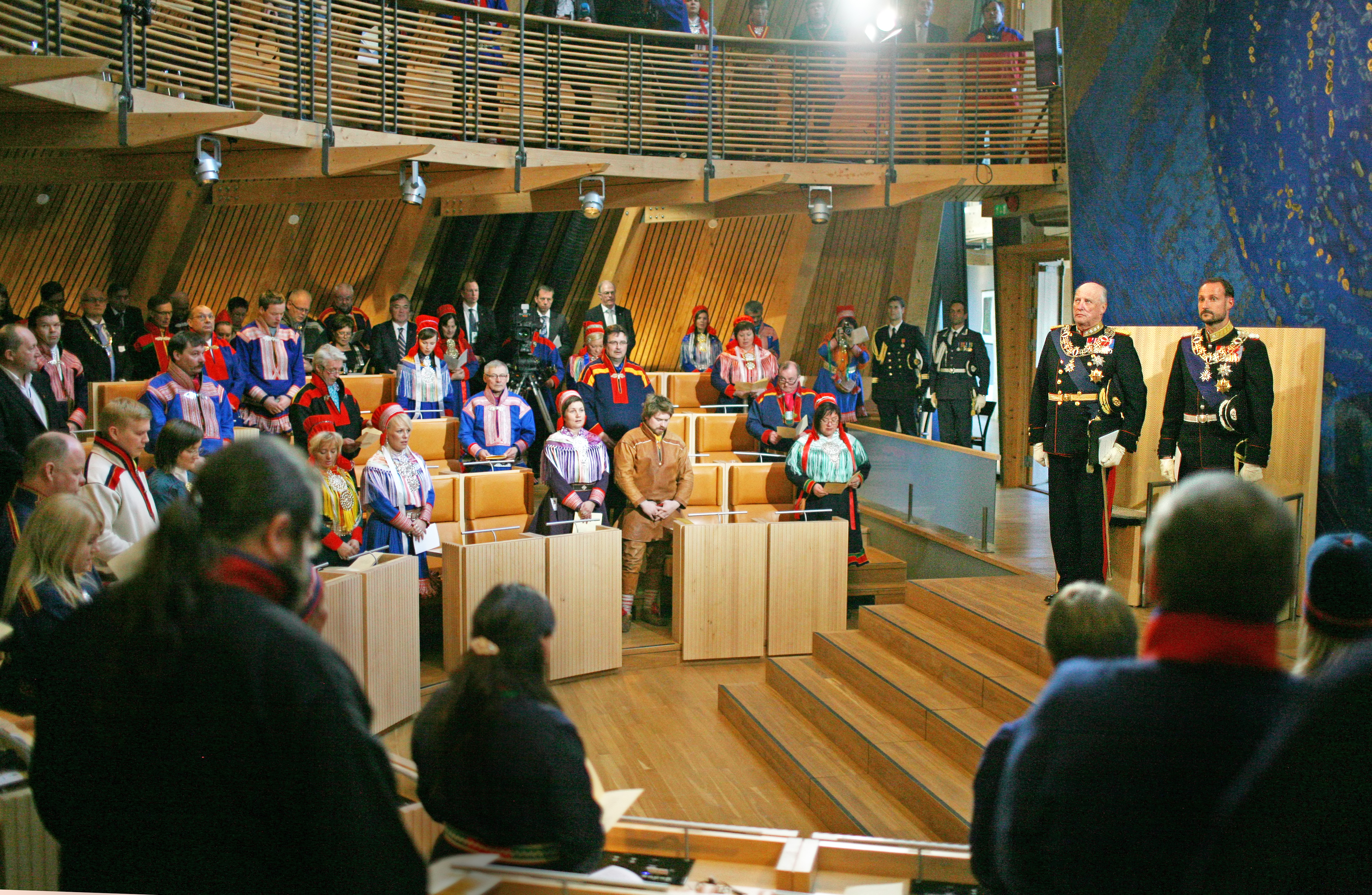
Plenary hall

In the Norwegian central administration the coordinating organ and central administrator for Sámi issues is the Department of Sámi and Minority Affairs in the Ministry of Labour and Social Inclusion. This department also coordinates inter-ministerial and Nordic state cooperation regarding Sámi issues. The Sámi Parliament is consulted when state government issues affect Sámi interests.

== See also ==
- Sámi politics
  - Sámi Parliament of Finland
  - Sámi Parliament of Sweden
  - Sámi Parliament of Russia
- Elections in Norway
