= Finnmark Act =

Norwegian law

The Finnmark Act (Norwegian: Finnmarksloven) of 2005 transferred about 96% (about 46,000 km^{2}) of the area in the Finnmark county in Norway to the inhabitants of Finnmark. This area is managed by the Finnmark Estate agency.

The Finnmark Estate is managed by a board of directors with six members. Three of these are appointed by the Sami Parliament of Norway, and three by the Finnmark County Council. The leader of the board is elected by the Sami Parliament and the County Council in alternating years.

== Background ==
The background for the Finnmark Act is the Sámi people's fight for their rights to manage their land and culture. In 1978 the Norwegian Water Resources and Energy Directorate published a plan that called for the construction of a dam and hydroelectric power plant that would create an artificial lake and inundate the Sami village of Máze. This plan was met by a strong opposition from the Sámi, and resulted in the Alta controversy. As a result of the controversy, the Norwegian government held meetings in 1980 and 1981 with a Sámi delegation appointed by the Norwegian Sámi Association, the Sámi Reindeer Herders’ Association of Norway and the Norwegian Sámi Council. The meetings resulted in the establishment of the Sámi Rights Committee addressing Sámi legal relations, that proposed among other things the establishing the Sami Parliament, and finally the adoption of the Finnmark Act in 2005.

The Sámi rights to lands, waters and resources were strengthened after 1990, when Norway recognized the Sámi as an indigenous people by adapting the ILO convention 169 concerning Indigenous and Tribal Peoples in Independent Countries. The convention states that rights for the indigenous peoples to land and natural resources are recognized as central for their material and cultural survival. In addition, indigenous peoples should be entitled to exercise control over, and manage, their own institutions, ways of life and economic development in order to maintain and develop their identities, languages and religions, within the framework of the States in which they live.

== Purpose ==
Traditionally the Norwegian authorities had a view that the nomadic Sámi use of land, water and natural resources did not establish any formal legal rights. The basis for the Finnmark act is that "the Sámis, through protracted traditional use of the land and water areas, have acquired individual and/or collective ownership and right to use lands and waters in Finnmark County."

The Finnmark act attempts to strengthen the Sámi rights, by giving the entire population of Finnmark greater influence of the property in the county. However, the act does not cover fishing rights in saltwater, mining, or oil rights.

An important element of the act is discussion and recognition of existing rights of use and ownership of land. For this purpose a commission and tribunal have been set up. The foundation of this work is the principles of established custom and immemorial usage. (ibid.)

== See also ==
- Hålogalandsallmenningen
