= List of Sámi women =

This is a list of Sámi women who are Sámi or who are of established Sámi descent.

== A ==
- Nina Afanasyeva (born 1939), Russian-Sami politician and language activist
- Inger-Mari Aikio-Arianaick (born 1961), Finnish Sami poet and journalist
- Agneta Andersson (born 1958), Swedish Sami sculptor and educator
- Karen Anette Anti (born 1972), Norwegian Sami politician
- Aleksandra Andreevna Antonova (1932–2014), Russian, Kildin Sami teacher, writer, poet, translator

== B ==
- Moa Backe Åstot (born 1998), Swedish Sámi author
- Astrid Båhl (born 1959), Norwegian Sami artist, designed the Sami flag
- Katarina Barruk (born 1994), Swedish Sami singer who performs in the Ume Sami language
- Matte Heatta Bjelland (born 1983), better known as Máddji, Norwegian-Sami singer, composer and soccer player
- Ellen-Sylvia Blind (1925–2009), Swedish Sami writer
- Mari Boine (born 1956), musician, Norwegian Sami
- Ella Holm Bull (1929–2006), Southern Sami teacher and writer

== C ==
- Milla Clementsdotter (1812–1892), Swedish Southern Sami Christian advocate

== D ==
- Sandra Dahlberg (born 1979), Swedish Sami singer
- Maja Dunfjeld (born 1947), Norwegian South Sami duodji expert

== E ==
- Monica Edmondson (born 1963), Swedish Sami glass artist
- Hanne Grete Einarsen (born 1966), Norwegian Sami artist
- Berit Marie Eira (born 1968), Norwegian Sami reindeer herder and politician
- Berit Oskal Eira (born 1951), Norwegian Sami politician
- Rawdna Carita Eira (born 1970), Norwegian Sami playwright
- Sandra Andersen Eira (born 1986), Norwegian Sami politician
- Edel Hætta Eriksen (1921–2023), Norwegian Sami schoolteacher and politician
- Elisabeth Erke (born 1962), Norwegian Sami educator and politician

== G ==
- Johanne Gaup (born 1950), Norwegian Sami politician

== H ==
- Barbro-Lill Hætta-Jacobsen (born 1972), Norwegian Sami politician
- Ellen Inga O. Hætta (born 1953), Norwegian Sami politician and educator
- Marja Helander (born 1965), Finnish Sami photographer and filmmaker
- Mette Henriette (born 1990), Norwegian Sami artist, Saxophonist and composer
- Rose-Marie Huuva (born 1943), Swedish Sami visual and textile artist, poet

== I ==
- Mariela Idivuoma (born 1976), Swedish Sami journalist and festival host
- Ella Marie Hætta Isaksen (born 1998), Norwegian Sami singer
- Signe Iversen (born 1956), language consultant and children's writer

== J ==
- Anna Jacobsen (1924–2004), Norwegian Sami writer, translator and publisher
- Sofija Efimovna Jakimovič (1940–2006), Kildin Sámi folklorist and author
- Ellinor Jåma (born 1979), Sami politician representing Åarjel-Saemiej Gielh
- Sofia Jannok (born 1982), Swedish Sami singer and radio host
- Jonne Järvelä (born 1974), Finnish vocalist and guitarist
- Agnete Johnsen (born 1994), Norwegian Sami pop singer
- Siri Broch Johansen (born 1967), Norwegian Sami singer and educator
- Annelise Josefsen (born 1949), Norwegian Sami artist
- Inga Juuso (1945–2014), Norwegian Sami singer and actress

== K ==
- Ragnhild Vassvik Kalstad (born 1966), Norwegian Sami politician
- Amanda Kernell (born 1986), Swedish Sami director and screenwriter
- Aili Keskitalo (born 1968), Norwegian Sami politician
- Asa Kitok (1894–1986), Swedish Sami birch-root artisan

== L ==
- Ann-Helén Laestadius (born 1971), journalist and children's novelist
- Hildá Länsman (born 1993), Finnish Sami singer
- Vibeke Larsen (born 1971), Norwegian Sami politician
- Kristina Katarina Larsdotter (1819–1854), also Stor-Stina, exceptionally tall Swedish Sami
- Rauni Magga Lukkari (born 1943), Northern Sami poet and translator

== M ==
- Rika Maja (1661–1757), Swedish Sami sharman
- Margareta (c.1369–c.1425), Swedish Sami missionary
- Maria Magdalena Mathsdotter (1835–1873), Swedish Sami founder of Sami schools
- Randi Marainen (born 1953), Norwegian-born Swedish Sami silversmith
- Britta Marakatt-Labba (born 1951), Swedish Sami textile artist
- Maxida Märak (born 1988), Swedish-Sami yoik singer, actress and activist
- Lajla Mattsson Magga (born 1942), Swedish-born Norwegian Sami teacher, children's writer and lexicographer
- Maria Magdalena Mathsdotter (1835–1873), Swedish Sami school founder
- Lajla Mattsson Magga (born 1942), Finnish-born Southern Sami teacher and children's writer
- Silje Karine Muotka (born 1975), Norwegian Sami politician
- Marit Myrvoll (born 1953), social anthropologist, museum director

== N ==
- Marja Bål Nango (born 1988), Norwegian Sami filmmaker
- Kathrine Nedrejord (born 1987), Norwegian Sámi writer
- Harriet Nordlund (born 1954), Swedish Sami actress and dramatist
- Anne Nuorgam (born 1964), Finnish Sami politician

== O ==
- Anna-Lisa Öst (1889–1974), known as Lapp-Lisa, Swedish Sami gospel singer
- Sara Margrethe Oskal (born 1970), Norwegian Sami writer, actress and film producer
- Marja-Liisa Olthuis (born 1967), Finnish Sami writer
- Ida Ovmar (born 1995), Swedish Sami model

== P ==
- Kirsti Paltto (born 1947), Finnish Sami writer
- Anja Pärson (born 1981), retired Swedish Sami alpine skier
- Helga Pedersen (born 1973), Norwegian Sami politician
- Synnøve Persen (born 1950), Norwegian Sami poet and visual artist
- Ulla Pirttijärvi-Länsman (born 1971), Finnish Sami folk singer
- Jelena Porsanger (born 1967), Russian-born Norwegian Sami ethnographer and cultural researcher

== R ==
- Elsa Laula Renberg (1877–1931), Swedish Sami activist, politician and writer

== S ==
- Tiina Sanila-Aikio (born 1983), musician, president of the Finnish Sami Parliament
- Máret Ánne Sara (born 1983), Norwegian Sami artist and writer
- Sollaug Sárgon (born 1965), Norwegian Sami poet
- Kirsti Saxi (born 1953), Norwegian Sami politician
- Katarina Pirak Sikku (born 1965), Swedish Sami painter and photographer
- Åsa Simma (born 1963), Swedish Sami actress and theatre director
- Ellen Aslaksdatter Skum (1827–1895), Borwegian Sami reindeer herder involved in the Kautokeino uprising
- Inger Smuk (born 1947), Norwegian Sami politician
- Liv Inger Somby (born 1962), educator, writer
- Marry A. Somby (born 1953), children's writer
- Karin Stenberg (1884–1969), Swedish Sami teacher and activist

== T ==
- Ann-Mari Thomassen (born 1964), Norwegian Sami politician
- Lisa Thomasson (1898–1932), also Lapp-Lisa, Swedish singer of Sami descent
- Sarah Thomasson (1925–1996), Swedish Sami alpine skier

== U ==
- Inger Elin Utsi (born 1975), Norwegian Sami politician
- Ingunn Utsi (born 1948), Norwegian sculptor, painter and illustrator

== V ==
- Ellen Marie Vars (born 1957), Norwegian Sami writer
- Láilá Susanne Vars (born 1976), Norwegian Sami lawyer and politician
- Kristine Andersen Vesterfjell (1910–1987), Norwegian Southern Sami reindeer herder and culture advocate

== W ==
- Sandra Márjá West (born 1990), Norwegian Sami politician and festival manager
- Sara Wesslin (born early 1990s), Finnish Sami journalist, supporter of the Skolt Sami language

== See also ==
- List of Sámi people
