= List of Sámi people =

This is a list of Sámi people who are Sámi or who are of established Sámi descent.

== A ==
- Nina Afanasyeva (born 1939), Russian-Sámi politician and language activist
- Aikia Aikianpoika (1591–1671), Finnish Sámi shaman
- Matti Aikio (1872–1929) early Norwegian Sámi writer
- Pekka Aikio (born 1944), Finnish Sami politician, president of the Sámi Parliament of Finland
- Amoc (born 1984), Finnish Sámi rapper
- Agneta Andersson (born 1958), Swedish Sámi sculptor and educator
- Karen Anette Anti (born 1972), Norwegian Sámi politician
- Aleksandra Andreevna Antonova (1932–2014), Russian, Kildin Sámi teacher, writer, poet, translator

== B ==
- Quiwe Baarsen (died 1627), Norwegian Sámi shaman
- Astrid Båhl (born 1959), Norwegian Sámi artist, designed the Sami flag
- Samuel Balto (1861–1921), Norwegian Sámi director
- Katarina Barruk (born 1994), Swedish Sámi singer who performs in the Ume Sami language
- Ellen-Sylvia Blind (1925–2009), Swedish Sámi writer
- Mari Boine (born 1956), musician, Norwegian Sámi
- Jan Egil Brekke (born 1974), Norwegian footballer
- Leif Arne Brekke (born 1977), Norwegian footballer
- Fred Buljo (born 1988), Norwegian Sámi rapper
- Ella Holm Bull (1929–2006), Southern Sámi teacher and writer

== C ==
- Milla Clementsdotter (1812–1892), Swedish Southern Sámi Christian advocate

== D ==
- Maja Dunfjeld (born 1947), Norwegian South Sámi duodji expert

== E ==
- Monica Edmondson (born 1963), Swedish Sámi glass artist
- Hanne Grete Einarsen (born 1966), Norwegian Sámi artist
- Berit Marie Eira (born 1968), Norwegian Sámi reindeer herder and politician
- Berit Oskal Eira (born 1951), Norwegian Sámi politician
- Sandra Andersen Eira (born 1986), Norwegian Sámi politician
- Edel Hætta Eriksen (1921–2023), Norwegian Sámi schoolteacher and politician
- Elisabeth Erke (born 1962), Norwegian Sámi educator and politician
- Erik Eskilsson (fl. 1687), Swedish Sámi accused of blasphemy

== F ==
- Jon Henrik Fjällgren (born 1987), Swedish Sámi singer and yoiker
- Frode Fjellheim (born 1959), Norwegian Sámi yoiker and musician
- Anders Fjellner (1795–1876), Swedish Sámi priest and poet
- Ketil Flatnose (9th century), Norwegian Sámi hersir
- Per Fokstad (1890–1973), Norwegian Sámi teacher and politician

== G ==
- Ailo Gaup (1944–2014), Norwegian Sámi writer
- Ailo Gaup (born 1979), Norwegian Sámi motocross rider
- Gunvor Guttorm (born 1958), Sami artist, art historian and academic
- Hans Guttorm (1927–2013), Norwegian Sámi politician
- Ingor Ánte Áilo Gaup (born 1960), Norwegian Sámi actor, composer and folk musician
- Johanne Gaup (born 1950), Norwegian Sámi politician
- Mikkel Gaup (born 1968), Norwegian Sámi actor
- Nils Gaup (born 1955), Norwegian Sámi film director
- Per Willy Guttormsen (born 1942), Norwegian Sámi speed skater and politician
- Stig Gælok (born 1961), Norwegian Sámi poet and children's book writer

== H ==
- Aslak Hætta (1824–1854), a leader of the Kautokeino Rebellion
- Barbro-Lill Hætta-Jacobsen (born 1972), Norwegian Sámi politician
- Ellen Inga O. Hætta (born 1953), Norwegian Sámi politician and educator
- Lars Hætta (1834–1896), Norwegian Sámi reindeer herder and translator
- Mattis Hætta (born 1959), Norwegian Sámi singer
- Hallbjorn Halftroll (9th century), Norwegian Sámi hersir
- Mette Henriette (born 1990), Norwegian Sámi artist, Saxophonist and composer
- Reidar Hirsti (1925–2001), Norwegian Sámi newspaper editor and politician
- Sami Hyppia, Finnish footballer

== I ==
- Mariela Idivuoma (born 1976), Swedish Sámi journalist and festival host
- Ella Marie Hætta Isaksen (born 1998), Norwegian Sámi singer
- Signe Iversen (born 1956), Sámi language consultant and children's writer from Norway

== J ==
- Anna Jacobsen (1924–2004), Norwegian Sámi writer, translator and publisher
- Sofija Efimovna Jakimovič (1940–2006), Kildin Sámi folklorist and author
- Iver Jåks (1932–2007), Norwegian Sámi artist
- Ellinor Jåma (born 1979), Sámi politician representing Åarjel-Saemiej Gielh
- Sofia Jannok (born 1982), Swedish Sámi artist, singer and radio host
- Jonne Järvelä (born 1974), Finnish vocalist and guitarist
- Nils Jernsletten (1934–2012), Norwegian Sámi academic and newspaper editor
- Jonas Johansen (born 1985), Norwegian Sámi footballer
- Nils Jonsson (1804–1870), also known as Lapp-Nils, Swedish Sámi violinist and composer
- Siri Broch Johansen (born 1967), Norwegian Sámi singer and educator
- Agnete Johnsen (born 1994), Norwegian Sámi singer
- Tore Johnsen (born 1969), Norwegian Sámi priest and Sami church leader
- Annelise Josefsen (born 1949), Norwegian Sámi artist
- Inga Juuso (1945–2014), Norwegian Sámi singer and actress
- Per Isak Juuso (born 1953), Swedish Sámi artisan and teacher

== K ==
- Ragnhild Vassvik Kalstad (born 1966), Norwegian Sámi politician
- Aili Keskitalo (born 1968), Norwegian Sámi politician
- Asa Kitok (1894–1986), Swedish Sámi birch-root artisan
- Isalill Kolpus (born 1990), Norwegian Sámi comedian
- Finn Hågen Krogh (born 1990), Norwegian cross-country skier of Sámi descent
- Elin Kåven (born 1979), Sami music artist

== L ==
- Elin Anna Labba (born 1980), Swedish-born Sámi journalist and author
- Ann-Helén Laestadius (born 1971), Swedish Sámi journalist and children's novelist
- Hildá Länsman (born 1993), Finnish Sámi singer
- Vieno Länsman (died 2024), Finnish Sámi politician and reindeer herder
- Lars Levi Læstadius (1800–1861), Swedish-born priest of Sámi descent
- Eirik Lamøy (born 1984), Norwegian footballer
- Anders Larsen (1870–1949), Norwegian Sámi teacher, journalist and writer
- Vibeke Larsen (born 1971), Norwegian Sámi politician
- Kristina Katarina Larsdotter (1819–1854), also Stor-Stina, exceptionally tall Swedish Sámi
- Rauni Magga Lukkari (born 1943), Northern Sámi poet and translator
- Gustav Lund (1862–1912), Norwegian Sámi sled preacher and editor

== M ==
- Rika Maja (1661–1757), Swedish Sámi shaman
- Margareta (c.1369–c.1425), Swedish Sámi missionary
- Randi Marainen (born 1953), Norwegian-born Swedish Sámi silversmith
- Britta Marakatt-Labba (born 1951), Swedish Sámi textile artist
- Lajla Mattsson Magga (born 1942), Swedish-born Norwegian Sámi teacher, children's writer and lexicographer
- Ole Henrik Magga (born 1947), Norwegian Sámi linguist and politician
- Hans Ragnar Mathisen (born 1945), Norwegian Sámi artist and writer
- Maxida Märak (born 1988), Swedish Sámi yoik singer, musician, actress and rights activist
- Espen Minde (born 1983), Norwegian footballer
- Maria Magdalena Mathsdotter (1835–1873), Swedish Sámi founder of Sami schools
- Matti Morottaja (born 1942), Finnish Sámi politician and writer
- Silje Karine Muotka (born 1975), Norwegian Sámi politician
- Marit Myrvoll (born 1953), Sámi social anthropologist, museum director

== N ==
- Anna Näkkäläjärvi-Länsman (born 1979) Finnish singer songer, yoiker
- Marja Bål Nango (born 1988), Norwegian Sámi filmmaker
- Lars Nilsson (died 1693), Swedish Sámi shaman
- Ivar Nordkild (born 1941), Norwegian biathlete, gold medalist at the Biathlon World Championships 1966
- Åge Nordkild (1951–2015), Norwegian Sámi politician
- Harriet Nordlund (born 1954), Swedish Sámi actress and dramatist
- Anne Nuorgam (born 1964), Finnish Sámi politician
- Sven-Roald Nystø (born 1956), Norwegian Sámi politician
- Steffen Nystrøm (born 1984), Norwegian Sámi football player

== O ==
- Egil Olli (born 1949), Norwegian Sámi politician
- Kåre Olli (born 1959), Norwegian Sámi politician
- Marja-Liisa Olthuis (born 1967), Finnish Sámi writer
- Anna-Lisa Öst (1889–1974), known as Lapp-Lisa, Swedish Sámi gospel singer
- Sara Margrethe Oskal (born 1970), Norwegian Sámi writer, actress and film producer
- Ida Ovmar (born 1995), Swedish Sámi model

== P ==
- Anja Pärson (born 1981), retired Swedish Sámi alpine skier
- Helga Pedersen (born 1973), Norwegian Sámi politician
- Morten Gamst Pedersen (born 1981), Norwegian footballer of Sámi descent
- Steinar Pedersen (born 1947), Norwegian Sámi politician
- Lars Pirak (1932–2008), Swedish Sámi artist and yoiker
- Ulla Pirttijärvi-Länsman (born 1971), Finnish Sámi folk singer
- Anders Porsanger (1735–1780), first Sámi to receive a higher education
- Helvi Poutasuo (1943–2017), Finnish Sámi teacher, translator and newspaper editor

== R ==
- Israel Ruong (1903–1986), Swedish Sámi linguist and politician
- Elsa Laula Renberg (1877–1931), Swedish Sámi activist and politician

== S ==
- Wimme Saari (born 1959), Finnish Sámi yoik singer
- Isak Saba (1875–1921), Norwegian Sámi teacher and politician
- Erik Sandvärn (born 1975), Swedish Sámi footballer
- Börje Salming (1951–2022), Swedish Sámi ice hockey player
- Tiina Sanila-Aikio (born 1983), Skolt Sámi reindeer herder, musician and president of the Finnish Sámi Parliament from 2015–2020
- Johan Sara (born 1963), Norwegian Sámi musician, singer and composer
- Johan Mikkel Sara (born 1953), Norwegian Sámi politician
- Máret Ánne Sara (born 1983), Norwegian Sámi artist and writer
- Ole K. Sara (1936–2013), Norwegian Sámi politician
- Sollaug Sárgon (born 1965), Norwegian Sámi poet
- Kirsti Saxi (born 1953), Norwegian Sámi politician
- Katarina Pirak Sikku (born 1965), Swedish Sámi painter and photographer
- Åsa Simma (born 1963), Swedish Sámi actress and theatre director
- Sigbjørn Skåden (born 1976) Norwegian Sámi poet and novelist
- Ellen Aslaksdatter Skum (1827–1895), Norwegian Sámi reindeer herder involved in the Kautokeino uprising
- Inger Smuk (born 1947), Norwegian Sámi politician
- Ánde Somby (born 1958), Norwegian Sámi yoik artist and law professor
- Liv Inger Somby (born 1962), Sámi educator, writer
- Marry A. Somby (born 1953), Sámi children's writer from Norway
- Mons Somby (1825–1854), a leader of the Kautokeino rebellion
- Niillas Somby (born 1948), Norwegian Sámi political rights activist
- Karin Stenberg (1884–1969), Swedish Sámi teacher and activist
- Mikael Svonni (born 1950), Swedish Sámi linguist

== T ==
- Ann-Mari Thomassen (born 1964), Norwegian Sámi politician
- Lisa Thomasson (1898–1932), also Lapp-Lisa, Swedish singer of Sámi descent
- Torkel Tomasson (1881–1940), Swedish Sámi publisher and journalist
- Johan Turi (1854–1936), first Sámi writer

== U ==
- Inger Elin Utsi (born 1975), Norwegian Sámi politician
- Ingunn Utsi (born 1948), Norwegian Sámi sculptor, painter and illustrator
- Nils Utsi (1943–2019), Norwegian Sámi actor and film director
- Per A. Utsi (born 1939), Norwegian Sámi politician

== V ==
- Niko Valkeapää (born 1968), Sámi musician and yoik singer
- Nils-Aslak Valkeapää (1943–2001), Finnish Sámi writer, musician
- Raimo Valle (born 1965), Norwegian Sámi civil servant and politician
- Ellen Marie Vars (born 1957), Norwegian Sámi writer
- Láilá Susanne Vars (born 1976), Norwegian Sámi lawyer and politician
- Torgeir Vassvik (born 1962), Norwegian Sámi musician and composer
- Kristine Andersen Vesterfjell (1910–1987), Norwegian Southern Sámi reindeer herder and culture advocate

== W ==
- Sara Wesslin (born early 1990s), Finnish Sámi journalist, supporter of the Skolt Sámi language
- Liselotte Wajstedt (born 1973), Swedish Sámi documentary filmmaker interested in promoting Sámi traditions

== See also ==
- Category:Sámi people
- List of Sami women
