= Eira (disambiguation) =

Eira is a district in Helsinki, Finland.

Eira may also refer to:

== Places ==
- Eira (Messenia), a town of ancient Messenia, Greece
- Eira, Messenia, a municipal unit in Messenia, Greece
- Eira Hospital, a hospital in the district of Helsinki, Finland
- Eira River, a river in Nesset, Møre og Romsdal, Norway

== People ==
- Anna Eira Margarida Heiskari (born 1990), Finnish singer
- Eira Aune (born 1997), Norwegian handball player
- Eira Friesen (1917–2008), Welsh-born Canadian community activist
- Eira Lehtonen (1939–1984), Finnish gymnast
- Eira Stenberg (born 1943), Finnish playwright and writer
- Berit Marie Eira (born 1968), Norwegian Sami reindeer owner and politician
- Berit Oskal Eira (1951–2021), Norwegian Sami politician
- Inga Ravna Eira (born 1948), Norwegian Sami poet
- João Pedro Eira Antunes Da Silva (born 1999), Portuguese footballer
- Maaria Eira (1924—1999), Finnish opera singer and actress
- Marit Gaup Eira (born 1945), Norwegian Sami reindeer owner and singer
- Pedro Eira (born 1994), Portuguese footballer
- Rawdna Carita Eira (born 1970), Norwegian Sami playwright
- Sandra Andersen Eira (born 1986), Norwegian Sami politician

== Other ==
- Eira (mammal), a genus of carnivorous mammals
- Eira, Benjamin Leigh Smith's arctic exploration barquentine

== See also ==
- Eiras, surname
