= Rubus Arcticus (grant) =

The Rubus Arcticus is an annual cultural grant awarded by the County Council of Norrbotten County in Sweden. The grant is named after the Rubus arcticus, the scientific name of the Arctic raspberry (Swedish: åkerbär), which is the provincial flower of Norrbotten.

The grant is a development grant worth 100,000 SEK awarded to professional artists. From 1995 until 1998, it was awarded twice a year, once in the spring and once in the fall, to four artists each time. From 1998 until 2001, it was awarded to eight artists once a year. Since 2001, the grant has been awarded to four artists once a year.

== Recipients ==
Year	Recipient	Field
1995 (spring)	Paul-Anders Simma	multimedia
1995 (spring)	Gunilla G Bresky	film
1995 (spring)	Håkan Rudehill	drama
1995 (spring)	Marika Sandström	dance
1995 (fall)	Bengt Pohjanen	literature
1995 (fall)	Ingela Nilsson	multimedia
1995 (fall)	Osnát Opatowsky-Wahlberg	dance
1995 (fall)	Eva-Stina Sandling	visual arts
1996 (spring)	Eva Hammond	dance
1996 (spring)	Erik Norberg	music, drama
1996 (spring)	Boris Ersson	film, multimedia
1996 (spring)	Erik Fankki	handicraft
1996 (fall)	Eva Källman	art
1996 (fall)	Dan Lundström	film
1996 (fall)	Charlotta Ruth	dance
1996 (fall)	Jan Ferm	music
1997 (spring)	Dan Lestander	art
1997 (spring)	Torbjörn Säfve	literature
1997 (spring)	Anna Pontén	film
1997 (spring)	Svante Lindqvist	music
1997 (fall)	Jan-Anders Eriksson	art
1997 (fall)	Åsa Simma	film, multimedia
1997 (fall)	Elisabeth Heilman-Blind	theater
1997 (fall)	Lars Gulliksson	music
1998 (spring)	Brita Weglin	art
1998 (spring)	Lena Stenberg	art
1998 (spring)	Katarina Fallholm	music, opera
1998 (spring)	Hans Andersson	literature
1998 (fall)	Lena Lahti	art
1998 (fall)	Kenneth Jansson	dance
1998 (fall)	Marianne Öqvist	art
1998 (fall)	Dave Ave (David Lindgren, Aron Tideström)	music
1999	Jan Sandström	music
1999	Yana Sundgren Mangi	music
1999	Katarina Kieri	literature
1999	Mattias Alkberg	literature
1999	Mikael Niemi	literature
1999	Lennart Holmbom	art
1999	Gudrun Söderholm	art
1999	Christer Engberg	film
2000	Bertil Sundstedt	art
2000	Åsa Bergdahl	art
2000	Britta Marakatt-Labba	art
2000	Lisbeth Sandberg	music
2000	Kristoffer Åström	music
2000	Ann Marie Ljungberg	literature
2000	Bror Astermo	theater
2000	Katarina Wennberg	dance
2001	Boel Forssell	theater
2001	Lena Ylipää	art
2001	Pontus Wikström	film
2001	Manlio Hjelm-Giordano	music
2002	Maria Vedin	literature
2002	Peo Rask	literature
2002	Erling Fredriksson	music
2002	Ricky Sandberg	art
2003	Carina Henriksson	opera
2003	Rose-Marie Huuva	literature
2003	Johan Ramström	music
2003	David Vikgren	literature
2004	Anna Vnuk	dance
2004	Mona Mörtlund	literature
2004	Pia Suonvieri	performance arts
2004	Christer Lövgren	art
2005	Anette Winblad	film
2005	Kjell Morin	theater
2005	Monica L. Edmondson	art
2005	Yngve Ryd	literature
2006	Sofia Jannok	music
2006	Magnus Fredriksson	film
2006	Cecilia Hansson	literature
2006	Jenny Välitalo	music
2007	AnnaSofia Mååg	art
2007	Mattias Kalander	music
2007	Agneta Andersson	art
2007	Simon Marainen	music
2008	Kerstin Hedström	art
2008	Joar Tiberg	literature
2008	Ann-Helén Laestadius	literature
2008	Markus Wargh	music
2009	Ingela Lekfalk	film
2009	Gun Olofsson	music
2009	Sara Edström	art
2009	Jonas Selberg Augustsén	film
2010	Mitra Sohrabian	film
2010	Randi Marainen	art
2010	Patrik Häggström	dance
2010	Anton Raukola	theater
2011	Klas Hällerstrand	art
2011	Pia-Karin Helsing	music
2011	Lisa Hennix	dance
2011	Cecilia Enberg	art
2012	Anna Azcárate	theater
2012	Christian Svarfvar	music
2012	Lina Stoltz	literature
2012	Liselott Wajstedt	art
2013	Marcus Fjellström	music
2013	Barbro Lomakka	textile arts
2013	Maria Ros Palmklint	performing arts
2013	Johanna Lindbäck	literature
2014	Victoria Andersson	visual arts
2014	Camilla Blomqvist	screenwriting
2014	Daniel Wikslund	music
2014	Jouni Vesa	dance
2015	Nicolai Dunger	music
2015	Fanny Kivimäki	dance
2015	Magnus Svensson	visual arts
2015	Marie Wårell	dance
2016	Anja Örn	arts
2016	Elin Ruuth	literature
2016	Jonna Löfgren	music
2016	Marcus Baldemar	dance
2017	Anders Alm	photography
2017	Charlotta Lennartsdotter	film
2017	David Väyrynen	literature
2017	Rasmus Lindberg	theater
2018	Lotta Lampa	arts
2018	Thomas Hämén	arts
2018	Bo Selinder	music
2018	Linda Remahl	dance
2019	Anders Sunna	arts
2019	Daniel Åberg	literature
2019	Anna-Sofia Monroy	music
2019	Charlotte Lindmark	acting
2020	Jenny Nordmark	visual and sculptural arts
2020	Jerry Carlsson	film
2020	Vera Vinter	music
2020	Eva Svaneblom	dance
2021	Andreas R Andersson	visual and sculptural arts
2021	Linnea Axelsson	literature
2021	Zakarias Lekberg	music
2021	Sven Björklund	theater
2022	Ida Isak Westerberg	visual and sculptural arts
2022	Elin Anna Labba	literature
2022	Mirja Palo	music
2022	Jon Blåhed	film
