= Lukkari =

Lukkari is a Finnish surname.

== Geographical distribution ==
As of 2014, 89.9% of all known bearers of the surname Lukkari were residents of Finland (frequency 1:4,759), 5.3% of the United States (1:5,312,519) and 2.7% of Sweden (1:281,336) and 1.3% of Norway (1:302,491).

In Finland, the frequency of the surname was higher than national average (1:4,759) in the following regions:

1. Kainuu (1:186)
2. Lapland (1:2,193)
3. North Ostrobothnia (1:2,431)
4. Kymenlaakso (1:3,560)

== People ==
- Rauni Magga Lukkari (born 1943), Sámi poet and translator
