= Marit Tingelstad =

Norwegian politician

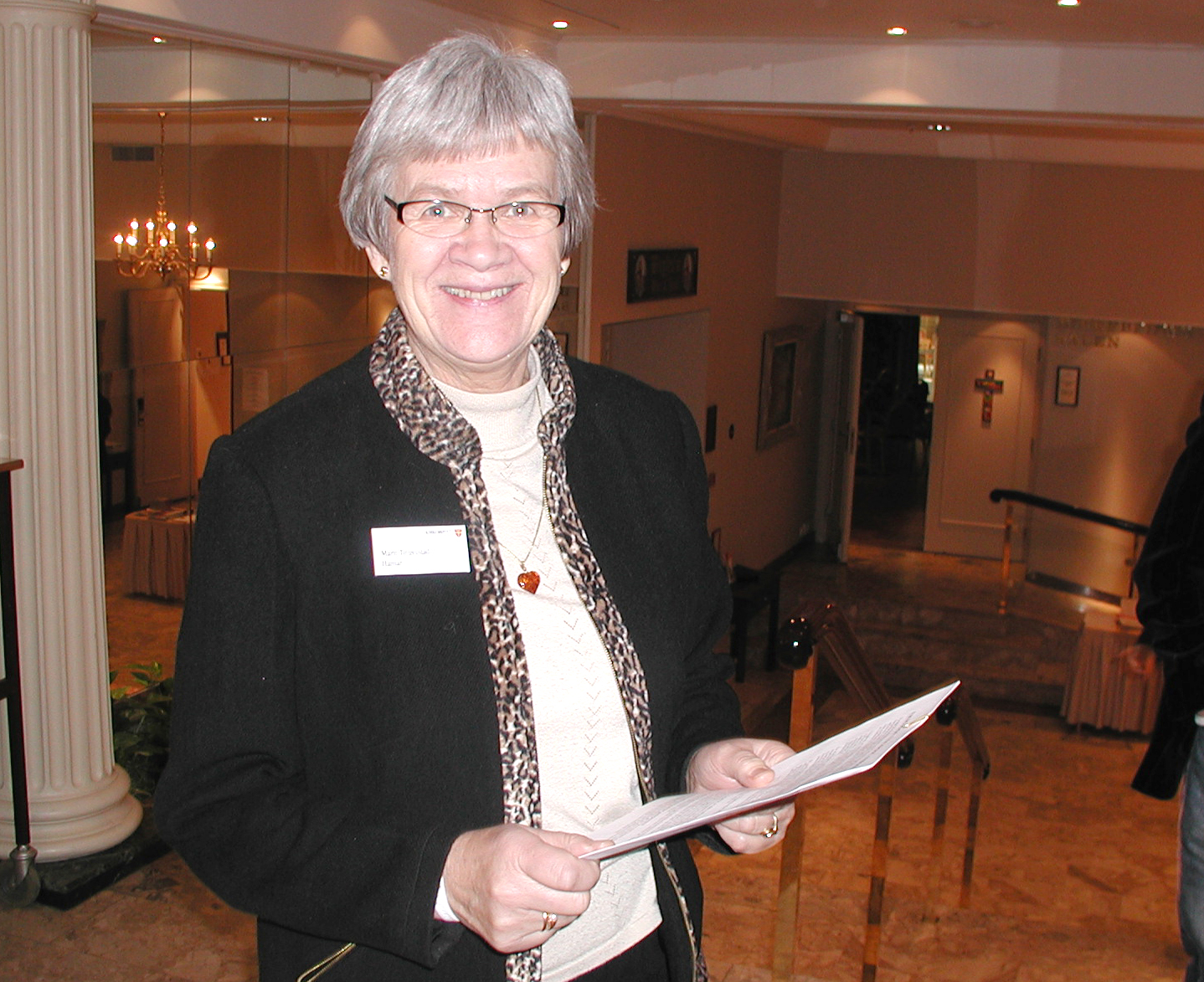
Marit Tingelstad in 2005. Photo: Kirkens Informasjonstjeneste

Marit Tingelstad (born 18 June 1938 in Lier, Norway) is a Norwegian politician for the Centre Party.

She was elected to the Norwegian Parliament from Oppland in 1993, and was re-elected on one occasion. She had previously served in the position of deputy representative during the term 1989–1993.

Tingelstad was a member of the municipal council for Gran Municipality during the term 1975–1979, and of Oppland county council during the term 1987–1991.

Party political offices
| Preceded by Ragnhild Queseth Haarstad | Leader of the Centre Women; 1994–1998 | Succeeded by Johanne Gaup |
