= Randi Marainen =

Randi Marainen, née Eriksen (born 12 April 1953 in Børselv, Porsanger Municipality in Finnmark, Norway), is a Swedish Sámi silversmith and artist.

Marainen grew up in a Sami family on the Norwegian Atlantic coast and trained as a silversmith with the German silver and goldsmith Gispert Dunker in Kautokeino Municipality. She has also studied duodji at Samernas utbildningscentrum in Jokkmokk, and pedagogy at college. She worked for a few years at the Sámslift Foundation Sámi Duodji in Jokkmokk with research on and development of duodji.

Her public artwork includes a decoration in the main stairwell of the Diehtosiida campus.

She lives and works in Nedre Soppero/Vuolle-Sohppar in Kiruna Municipality. She is married to artisan Thomas Marainen and is the mother of singer Simon Marainen.

== Awards ==
- 2010 – Asa Kitok Award
- 2010 – Rubus arcticus
- 2019 – The Culture Award of the Sámi Council (Church of Sweden)
