= Máddji =

Sami musical artist

Máddji Ánne Máddji Heatta
- Born: 1983 (age 42–43); Northern Norway
- Origin: Finnmark, Norway
- Genres: Contemporary Folk Music
- Occupation: Musician
- Years active: 2007–present

Máddji (full name Ánne Máddji Heatta) (born 1983), is a Norwegian-Sami singer, composer and former top soccer player. Máddji grew up in Karasjok and Kautokeino in Finnmark. She is the daughter of NRK journalist Nils Johan Heatta and sister of football player Elle Marja Heatta.

Máddji is a graduate physician of the University of Oslo from 2009. She was a student at Stokmarknes and Myre in 2009–10, then a pediatrician at the University Hospital of Northern Norway in Tromsø, and since 2011 has lived and worked in her home municipality of Kautokeino. Previously she played defense for Asker FK. She has been in nine national matches for Norway, and was in the J18 team who lost the EM final against Germany in 2001, but she had to give up football in 2003 because of a knee injury.

Máddji has performed in a number of official contexts, including in the Sámi Grand Prix in 2006. Her solo debut came in 2010 with the album Dobbelis, released on the Sami label DAT. "Dobbelis" is best translated with the word "beyond", and her music is characterized by a somewhat different aural landscape than traditionally associated with Sami music. Máddji has also contributed as a vocalist and songwriter to two of the songs from Inger-Mari Aikio-Arianaick on the Sami children's album Ima Ipmasat from 2007. She has also collaborated with the Norwegian duo Alvedanser, and contributes to the joik (a type of Sami singing) in the song "Save Me" by Tone Damli.
