= Christian Svarfvar =

Swedish violinist (born 1982)

- Born: 1982 (age 43–44); Sweden
- Genres: Classical
- Occupation: Violinist
- Instrument: Violin
- Website: christiansvarfvar.com

Christian Svarfvar (born 1982) is a Swedish violinist. He has recorded three albums with the London Philharmonic Orchestra and performed as a soloist at venues including Carnegie Hall, the Musikverein, the Concertgebouw and the Cité de la Musique. In December 2024 he appeared as violin soloist at the Nobel Prize Banquet in Stockholm.

== Early life and education ==
Svarfvar was born in Sweden in 1982. His father, Sven-Ole Svarfvar, was a former first concertmaster of the Norwegian Opera and the Swedish Chamber Orchestra. Svarfvar made his solo debut at the age of twelve, performing Mendelssohn's Violin Concerto with the Swedish Chamber Orchestra at Örebro Concert Hall.

He studied at the Royal College of Music, Stockholm, completing his soloist diploma in 2002, and received first prize at the Ljunggrenska Competition in Gothenburg the same year. He continued his studies at the Juilliard School in New York under Robert Mann, graduating with a master's degree in 2005.

== Career ==
In 2008 Svarfvar was selected as a "Rising Star" by Konserthuset Stockholm and the European Concert Hall Organisation. The nomination led to recitals at halls including the Musikverein in Vienna, the Concertgebouw in Amsterdam, the Palais des Beaux-Arts in Brussels and the Cité de la Musique in Paris. He made his New York recital debut at Carnegie Hall as part of the venue's Distinctive Debuts series.

In 2007 Svarfvar gave the world premiere of the violin concerto Eastern Promises by Howard Shore with the Royal Stockholm Philharmonic Orchestra, conducted by the composer.

He has performed as a soloist with orchestras including the London Philharmonic Orchestra, the Swedish Radio Symphony Orchestra, the Swedish Chamber Orchestra, the Simón Bolívar Symphony Orchestra, the Istanbul State Symphony Orchestra and the symphony orchestras of Helsingborg, Malmö and Norrköping. In October 2026 he is scheduled to perform Tchaikovsky's Violin Concerto with the New Japan Philharmonic at Dai-ichi Life Hall in Tokyo, conducted by Vahan Mardirossian.

From 2007 to 2013, he was a member of the Swedish contemporary music ensemble NEO, with which he participated in the premieres of more than 100 works. He has collaborated with composers including Steve Reich, Kaija Saariaho, Anders Hillborg and Chaya Czernowin.

In 2023 Svarfvar performed at the concert marking the opening of the Swedish Parliament, held at Stockholm Concert Hall and broadcast on SVT. In December 2024 he appeared as violin soloist at the Nobel Prize Banquet at Stockholm City Hall, performing alongside Laleh in a programme with newly composed music.

Svarfvar holds a position as senior lecturer in violin and chamber music at Örebro University.

== Recordings ==
Svarfvar's debut album, featuring the three Grieg Violin Sonatas, was released on Sterling Records. The 2015 album Après un rêve, recorded with pianist Roland Pöntinen for BIS Records, features works by Fauré, Ravel and Debussy. The album was named Recording of the Year by Dagens Nyheter.

His 2018 recording of Bruch's Violin Concerto No. 1 and Stenhammar's Violin Sonata, made with the London Philharmonic Orchestra under Joana Carneiro, was released on Rubicon Classics.

In 2021, Svarfvar released Infinite Bach, featuring reinterpretations of J. S. Bach's violin concertos by the Swedish composer Johan Ullén, recorded with the London Philharmonic Orchestra at Abbey Road Studios and released on Rubicon Classics.

In 2023 he released The Symphonic Touch of Benny Andersson on Naxos, a collection of symphonic arrangements by Anders Berglund of compositions by ABBA member Benny Andersson, recorded with the London Philharmonic Orchestra.

Svarfvar performs on a Sanctus Seraphin violin from 1736, on loan from the Järnåker Foundation.

== Selected discography ==
- Grieg Violin Sonatas (Sterling Records)
- Après un rêve (BIS Records, 2015)
- Bruch & Stenhammar (Rubicon Classics, 2018)
- Infinite Bach (Rubicon Classics, 2021)
- The Symphonic Touch of Benny Andersson (Naxos, 2023)

== Awards ==
- 2002 – First prize, Ljunggrenska Competition, Gothenburg
- 2008 – Rising Star, European Concert Hall Organisation
- 2016 – Stockholm Culture Award
