= Katarina Pirak Sikku =

Swedish Sami painter and photographer (born 1965)

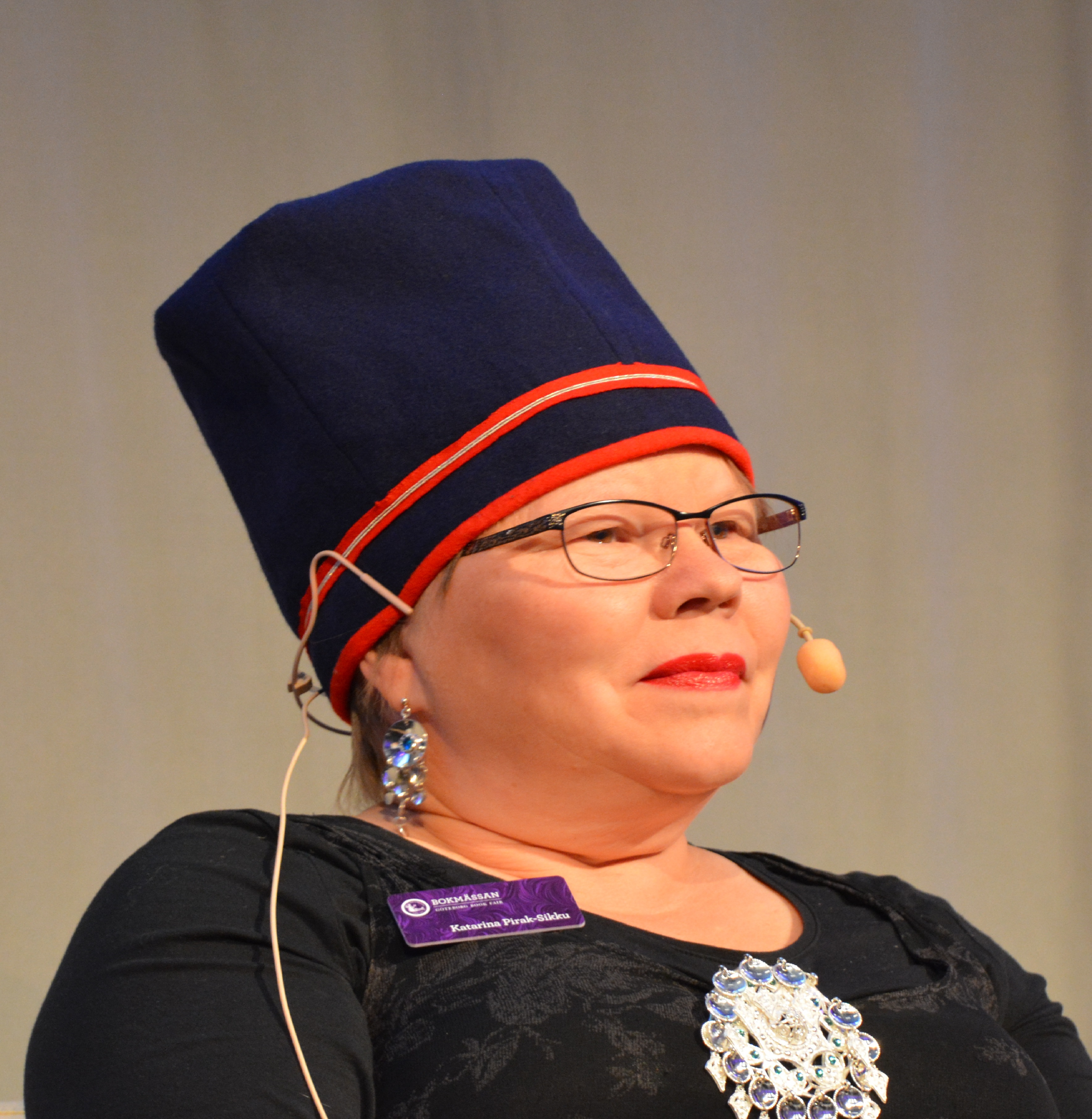
Katarina Pirak Sikku

Katarina Maria Larsdotter Pirak Sikku (born 12 April 1965) is a Swedish Sami painter and photographer. In 2015, she was nominated for Dagens Nyheters cultural prize for her exhibition Nammalahpan based on 10 years study of race biological research into Sami people.

== Biography ==
Born on 12 April 1965 in Jokkmokk, Katarina Maria Larsdotter Pirak Sikku is the youngest daughter of the Sami artist and yoiker Lars Pirak and his wife Astrid. She attended the Art College in Umeå. Her art combines drawing, photography, painting, installation and text. It has been exhibited in Sweden, Finland, Norway and Colombia.

When she was young, she heard rumours that research had been carried out on Sami people in her area. She later decided to question eight Sami women to obtain more information about what went on. It turned out all the women had heard about the race-biological examinations which had included photography and measurements of facial features. It turned out that among the numerous Samis investigated, details of her father, grandfather and her mother's uncle had been archived.

Pirak Sikku documented the lives of the Samis she had investigated with collages, paintings and landscapes which were presented at her Nammaláhpán exhibition in Umeå in the spring of 2014. A further exhibition of her work was held at the Nordland Nasjonalparksenter in the village of Røkland in Saltdal Municipality, in February and March 2019.
