= Rawdna Carita Eira =

Norwegian and Sámi playwright and author

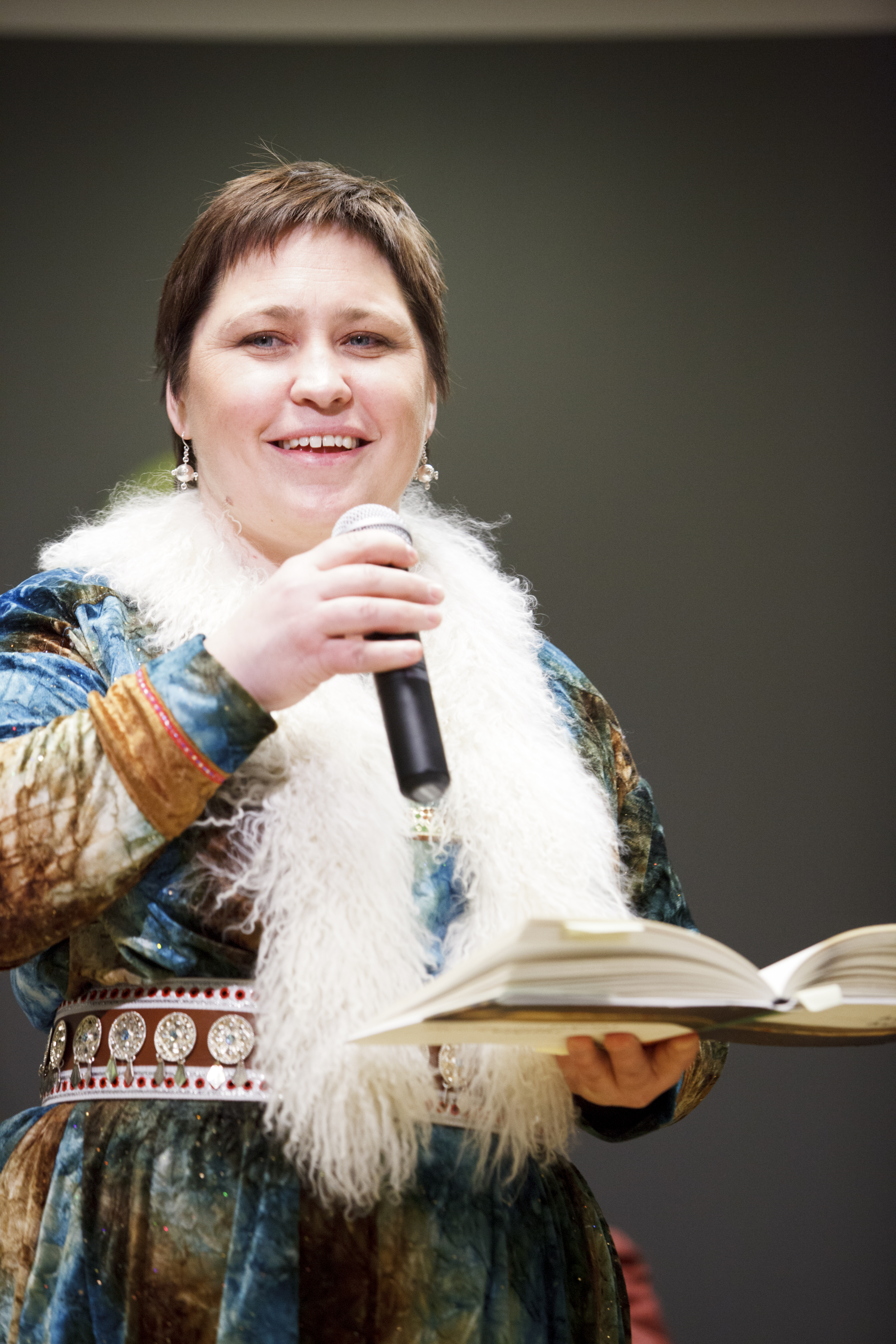
Rawdna Carita Eira

Rawdna Carita Eira (born 6 October 1970 in Elverum) is a Norwegian and Sámi playwright and author. She grew up in Brønnøysund in Nordland county in Norway and trained to be a teacher. She has worked as a reindeer herder, stage manager and playwright associated with Beaivváš Sámi Theatre. She has written lyrics for her own songs and tunes by, among others, Mari Boine. Eira published a bilingual book in 2011, ruohta muzetbeallji ruohta/løp svartøre løp, which was nominated for the Nordic Council Literature Prize in 2012. She lives in Kautokeino Municipality.

== Selected works ==
- "Grense", short stories in Gába 1998:1-2
- Elle muitalus/ Elens historie, drama, 2003
- Kjøttstykker, short stories in Kuiper 2008:3-4
- Arktisk Hysteri, drama, 2011 (with Mette Bratzeg)
- Maijen i huldrelandet, radio story for children in 19 parts, 2008
- Guohcanuori šuvva/ Sangen fra Rotsundet, drama, 2011
- ruohta muzetbeallji ruohta/løp svartøre løp ("Running, Svartöra, maturity!"), Gyldendal, 2011, ISBN 9788205418738
