= Sofija Jakimovič =

Kindin Sámi poet and author

Sofija Efimovna Jakimovič
- Born: March 23, 1940 Lovozero, Murmansk, USSR
- Died: June 15, 2006 (aged 66)
- Occupation: Folklorist, Author
- Language: Kildin Sámi, Russian

Sofija Efimovna Jakimovič (Russian: Софья Ефимовна Якимович; 23 March 1940 – 15 June 2006), also known as Efim Sofia, was a Soviet and Russian Kildin Sámi-language folklorist, poet, storyteller, composer, and translator.

== Early life ==
She was born in Lovozero, Murmansk, on the Kola Peninsula in Russia (then the Soviet Union). After school, Jakimovič worked as a laborer, helping to construct a railway from Oktyabrsky to Revda, and then as a concrete worker, earthmover, and bricklayer for the Lovozerstroy construction firm.

== Folklorist and author ==
After retiring, Jakimovič turned her attention to writing drawing upon family tales, songs, and folklore of her Sámi ancestors. In 1992, she organized the Sámi folklore group Чуззем (Čuzz'em), which performed in Estonia, Finland, and Norway.

In 1999, the Norwegian company Davvi Girji OS published Jakimovič's bilingual fairy tale Мо̄джесь На̄ст / Čáppa Násttáš ("Beautiful Starlet") in Kildin Sámi and Northern Sámi about a girl who falls in love with a fisherman. The same year, collection of her poems, Праздник медведя (Feast of the Bear), was published in a translation by the Russian poet Vikdan Sinitsyn. In 2015, Са̄мь мо̄а̄ййнас / Саамские сказки (Sámi Tales), a collection of her folktales, was published in Kilden Sámi and Russian.
