= Åsa Simma =

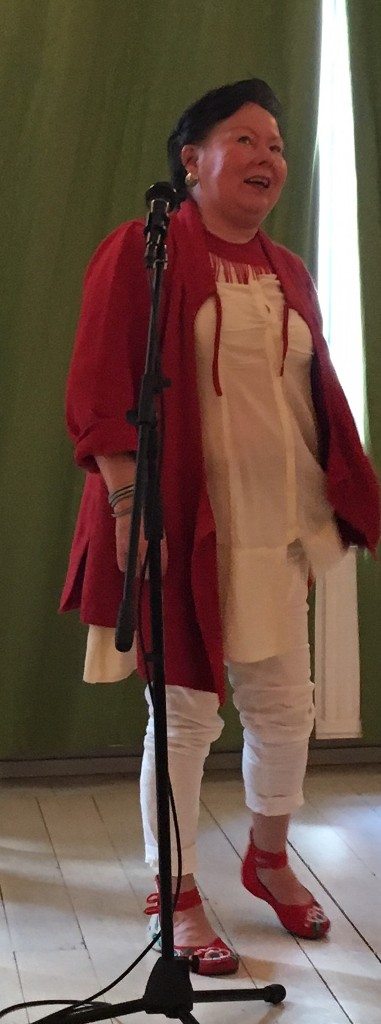
Åsa Simma

Åsa Maria Gabriella Simma (born 8 October 1963 in Karesuando) is a Swedish Sami theatre director, actress, yoik singer and scriptwriter. She was the recipient of the Danish theatre prize Håbets Pris in the year 2000. In the same year, she wrote and directed the short film Sapmi Magic. In 2015, she was appointed head of the Sami peoples theatre, Giron Sámi Teáhter.

== Biography ==
Born on 8 October 1963 in Karesuando in the far north of Sweden, Åsa Maria Gabriella Simma was raised a family of reindeer herders in the Swedish Siida village of Lainiovuoma in the winter months but spent the summers on the Norwegian side of the border. Her mother, who came from a family of storytellers, was keen to teach her how to yoik. When she was nine, the Sami yoik singer Nils-Aslak Valkeapää was so impressed with her delivery, he took her on a yoiking trip during the summer, introducing her to the art of Sami performance.

Professionally, she has worked as the cultural coordinator at the Canadian Native Theatre School, acted in Belgium, toured throughout Europe, and headed the Dálvadis theatre group in Karesuando which later became the Giron Sámi Teáhter. After working for a period at the International Sámi Film Institute, in August 2015 she was appointed head of the Giron Sámi Teáhter.

== Awards ==
- 1997: Rubus Arcticus stipendium
- 2000: Danish theatre prize Håbets Pris
