= Ingunn Utsi =

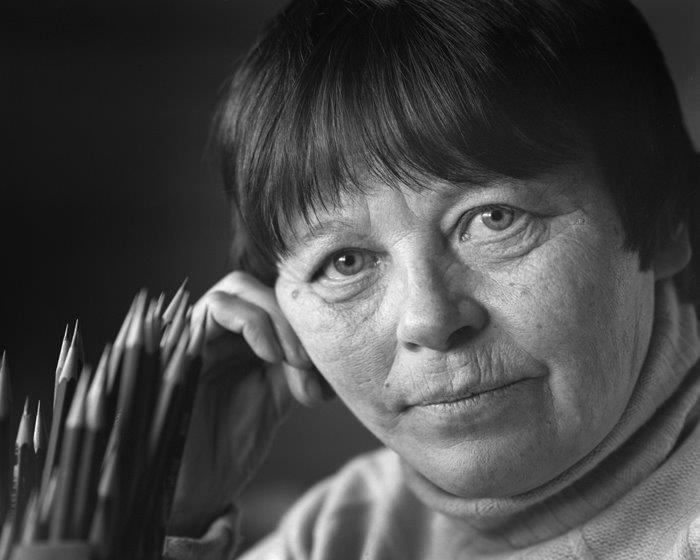
- Born: November 1948 (age 77–78); Nordkapp Municipality, Norway
- Education: University of Oslo; Trondheim Academy of Fine Art
- Occupations: Painter, sculptor
- Father: Ivar Utsi

Ingunn Utsi (born 1948) is a Norwegian Sámi sculptor, painter and book illustrator from Repvågstranda in Norway's Nordkapp Municipality. In recognition of her contributions to Sámi culture, in 2019 she was elected an honorary member of the Sámi Cultural Association (Samisk Kunstnerforbund, SDS). One of her most celebrated works is Gudni II (Homage II), a sculpture she created in 2016 on the trunk of a pine tree in the Art Park of Ii, Finland.

== Biography ==
Born in November 1948 near Repvågstranda in the Nordkapp Municipality, she was brought up by parents who only spoke Sámi at home, considering it important for her to use the native language rather than Norwegian. She was possibly the last child in the area to have Sámi as her mother tongue as those born after 1953 were raised in Norwegian. From 1955, she attended the Norwegian-speaking boarding school in Repvågstranda where her elder brother Oliver helped her with Norwegian. After the school was closed in 1957, she continued her education at the Solvang boarding school in Sarnes, continuing at the junior high school in Honningsvåg and at the high school in Alta.

She went on to study Sámi at the University of Oslo but the "standard" Sámi she learnt was quite different from her mother tongue. She then studied at the Trondheim Art School, first developing her drawing but soon specializing in sculpture.

Utsi works mainly as a sculptor with a combination of materials including wood, plastic, stone and metal. She explains her approach as follows:

"When I am working with three-dimensional wooden objects, I almost never make any sketches. I work directly with the material and let it talk to my mind, my eyes and hands. In many ways, I can 'see' the result by letting the material be my guide, but there are surprises or demands in the wood itself, and I have to take that into consideration. While shaping the material, it grows and becomes my piece of art."

Utsi's work has been exhibited widely and is in the permanent collections of various museums. In October 2008, several of her works were presented in a solo exhibition arranged by the Alta Cultural Association. These included a series of her drawings expressing ideas of "timeless time" as well as a floor-based installation combining metal and plexiglass.
