= Ann-Mari Thomassen =

Sámi politician from the Norwegian side of Sápmi

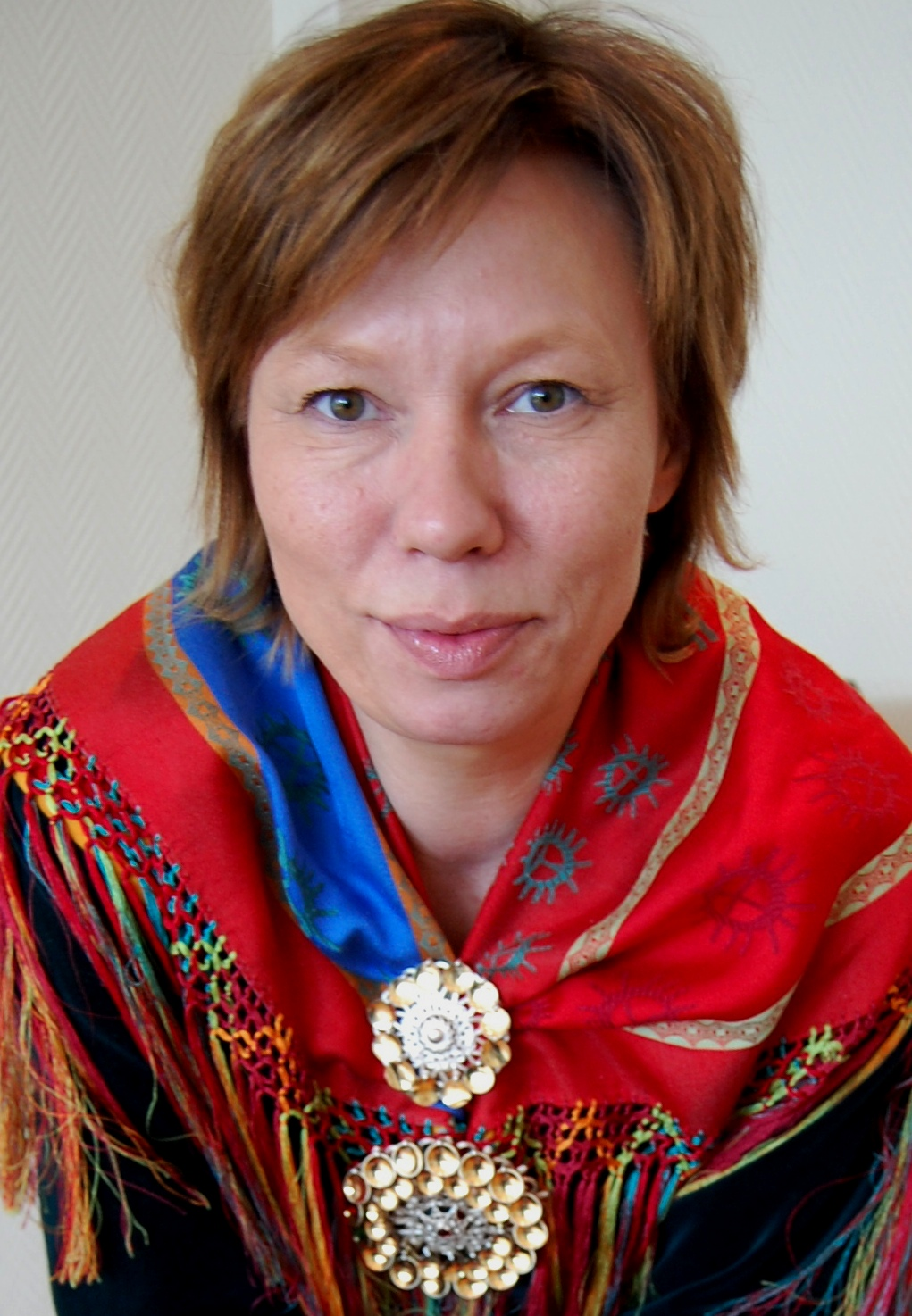

Member of the Sámi Parliament of Norway
- In office 2001–2017
- Constituency: Lulli Romsa (2001–2009); Vesthavet (2009–2017)

Personal details
- Born: Ann-Mari Katharine Thomassen; 18 April 1964 (age 62) Hamarøy, Norway
- Education: University of Tromsø
- Occupation: Schoolteacher

Ann-Mari Katharine Thomassen (born 1964) is a Sámi politician and a schoolteacher. A member of the Norwegian Sámi Association and the Sámi Parliamentary Council, she has served as a member of the Sámi Parliament of Norway from 2001 to 2017. Thomassen has been a strong supporter of the requirement for Sámi educators to be employed in Oslo's Sámi kindergarten.

== Biography ==
Born on 18 April 1964 in Hamarøy Municipality, Ann-Mari Katharine Thomassen was brought up in various places in Skånland Municipality. As of 2009, she lived in Sandmark and Renså.

After primary school in Trondenes, she attended high school in Harstad and Narvik (1980–1985). She completed her education as a teacher at the University of Tromsø (1995), specializing in Sámi (1996). Since 1995, Thomassen has taught in Skånland Municipality and in the neighboring Tjeldsund Municipality. In 1989, she became a committee member of the Sámi association Inna ja Biras, serving as its leader from 1992 to 1994. She also serves on a number of other boards and committees, including the Sandstrand School Choir, Stuornjárgga Sámiid Duodji, the Santor sports association and the Bygdeutviklingsselskap building development company.

Thomassen lives with her partner Sten Jakob Olsen. She has four children: Tom (1986), Henrik (1994), Maja (1998), and Sina (1999). She is fluent in Sámi and Norwegian.
