= Harriet Nordlund =

Swedish-Sami actress (1954–2023)

- Born: Gerd Harriet Linnéa Nordlund; 20 September 1954; Nautijaur, Sweden
- Died: 19 April 2023 (aged 68)
- Occupation: Actress
- Partner: Gustav Levin (separated)
- Children: 2

Gerd Harriet Linnéa Nordlund (20 September 1954 – 19 April 2023) was a Swedish-Sami actress, screenwriter and author.

Born in Nautijaur, Jokkmokk, Sweden, Nordlund graduated from the Statens scenskola in Stockholm in 1976. She was an actress at Orionteatern, Turteatern, Uppsala Stadsteater, Gottsunda Teatern, Norrbottensteatern, Stockholm City Theatre, Dálvadis and Samiska Teatern. In recent years, she had worked at Gävle Folk Theater. In spring 2009, she took office as Culture and Recreation Manager of Jokkmokk Municipality.

Nordlund dramatized 14 plays and herself wrote seven of them. She was the artistic director of Teatergruppen Dálvadis from 1971 to 1985 and Beaivváš Sámi Našunálateáhter in Kautokeino Municipality, Norway from 2002 to 2006. She hosted the program Sommar on Sveriges Radio P1 in August 1990.

Nordlund lived with Gustav Levin in the 80's and 90's and they had two daughters together (born 1982 and 1985 respectively).

Nordlund died on 19 April 2023, at the age of 68.

== Selected filmography ==
- 1975: Långtradarchaufförens berättelser
- 1991: Önskas
- 1997: Hästen och tranan
- 1997: In the Presence of a Clown
