= Johanne Gaup =

Norwegian politician (born 1950)

Johanne Gaup (born 23 October 1950, in Tromsø) is a Norwegian politician for the Centre Party.

She was elected to the Parliament of Norway from Finnmark county in 1993, but was not re-elected in 1997. In 1994, she became the first politician to speak one of the Sami languages from the Parliament chair. From 1997 to 2000, during Bondevik's First Cabinet, she was appointed State Secretary in the Ministry of Local Government and Regional Development.

On the local level, she was a member of Finnmark county council from 1987 to 1991, and deputy mayor of Karasjok Municipality from 2003 to 2007. She chaired Finnmark Centre Party from 1987 to 1991. From 1998 to 2000 she chaired the Centre Party Women's Association (Senterkvinnene), during which period she was also a member of the central party board.

Party political offices
Preceded by Marit Tingelstad	Leader of the Centre Women; 1998–2000	Succeeded by Inger S. Enger
