= Edel Hætta Eriksen =

Norwegian teacher and politician (1921–2023)

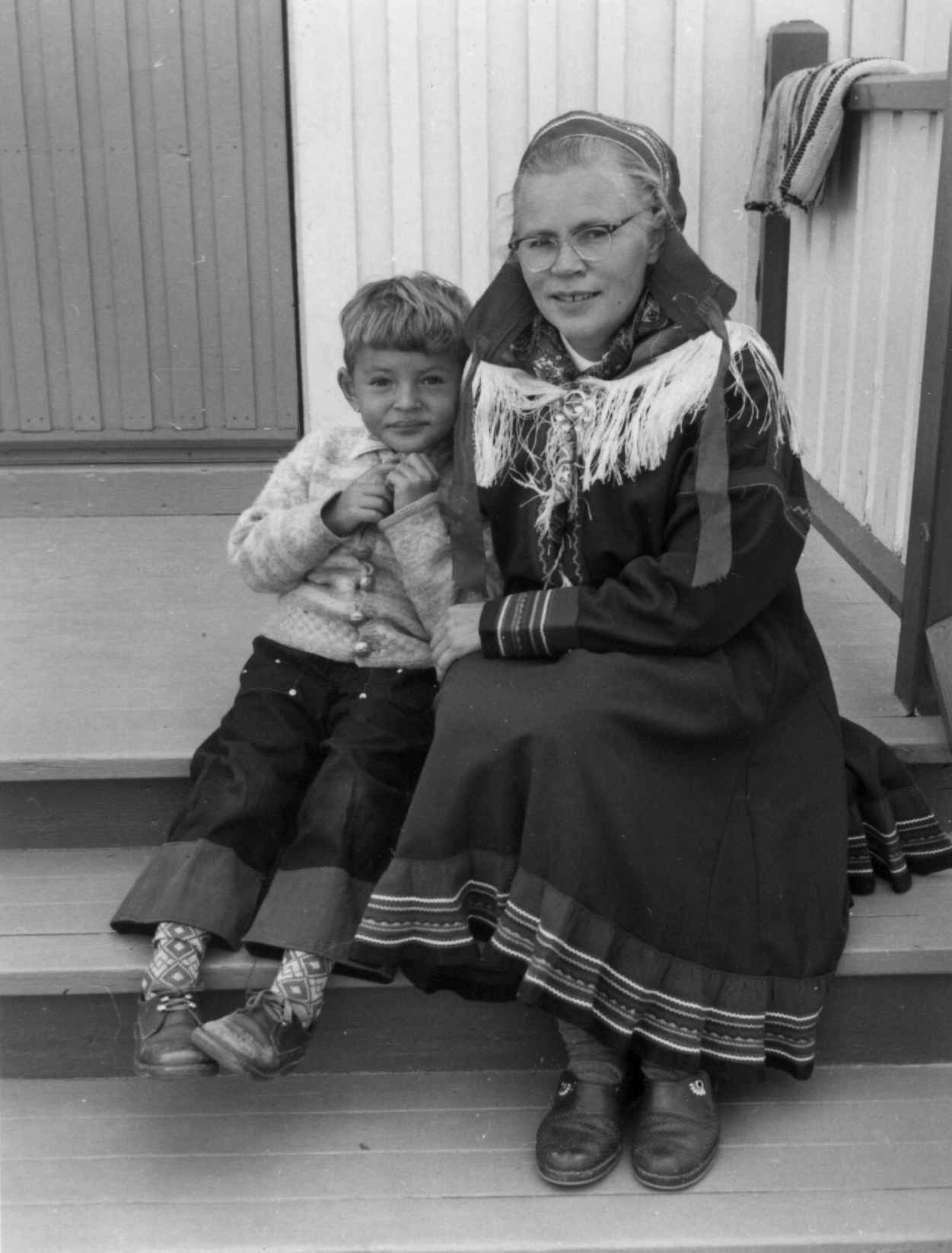
- Hætta Eriksen (right) in 1956

Saami Council
- In office 1956–1963

Personal details
- Born: 17 October 1921 Guovdageainnu Municipality, Norway
- Died: 13 August 2023 (aged 101)
- Occupation: Teacher, politician
- Awards: Order of St. Olav

Edel Hætta Eriksen (17 October 1921 – 13 August 2023) was a Norwegian politician and Northern Saami schoolteacher.

== Biography ==
Edel Hætta Eriksen was born in Guovdageainnu Municipality on 17 October 1921, to Klemet Klemetsen Hætta and midwife Berit Karen Olsdatter Erke. In 1949, she married Hagbart Andor Eriksen. She graduated from teaching schools in Nesna and Tromsø, specializing in duodji and Saami, and went on to work as a schoolteacher in Kautokeino from 1949 to 1969, and as headmaster from 1969 to 1977.

Hætta Eriksen served as the first director of Samisk utdanningsråd, from 1977 to 1989. She was a board member of the Norwegian Sami Association from 1968 to 1975, a member of the Saami Council from 1956 to 1963 and from 1974 to 1977, and a member of the Arts Council Norway. She was decorated Knight, First Class of the Order of St. Olav in 1988.

Edel Hætta Eriksen died on 13 August 2023, at the age of 101.

== Selected works ==
- Låkkangirj'ji sámi-ja dárogillii (2 volumes 1965/1970)
- Muitalusat ja dáhpáhusat Guovdageainnus (4 volumes 1991–1997)
