= Mariela Idivuoma =

Swedish-Sami journalist (born 1976)

Mariela Idivuoma (born 12 February 1976) is a Swedish-Sami freelance journalist and the host of the SVT's Sami news program Ođđasat. She has co-hosted the minority-language song festival Liet-Lávlut twice in 2006 together with Sofia Jannok and 2008 together with Rolf Digervall. Idivuoma lives together with Nordic combined skier Håvard Klemetsen, with whom she has a son. The couple resides in Trondheim, Norway.
