= Sara Wesslin =

Skolt Sámi journalist

- Born: 7 November 1991 (age 34); Finland
- Occupation: Journalist

Sara Wesslin (born 7 November 1991) is a Skolt Sámi journalist and news anchor from Finland and a strong advocate of the Skolt Sami language. She took on the Finnish Ministry of Education and Culture to secure funding from Finland for the Nordic Resource Centre for the Sami languages.

== Early life and education ==
Wesslin, was born in Finland on 7 November 1991. Skolt Sami is her grandmother Olga's mother tongue.

== Career ==
In 2006, few people under 30 could speak Skolt Sámi. Wesslin has promoted the use of the language in government, media, and in Finnish professional life. When she was featured in the BBC's 100 Women, Wesslin said that television news in Skolt Sami had been welcomed by the audience, especially those who do not use the Internet, as they could now follow it in their mother tongue.

Wesslin is a journalist with the Finnish broadcasting authority Yle, where she started to work in the newsroom in 2013. Based in Inari in the far north of Finland, she is one of just two journalists who currently broadcast on radio and television in the Skolt Sami language, the other being Erkki Gauriloff.

She writes stories and presents the news in Skolt Sami, Northern Sami, and Finnish. Wesslin has assisted Tiina Sanila-Aikio, president of the Finnish Sámi Parliament, who has also contributed to the revival of the Skolt Sami language and culture. She has used her media resources and access to popular culture to help revive the Skolt Sámi language. She has also focused on teaching it to women who she believes play a huge role in keeping the language in their family.

She took on the Finnish Ministry of Education and Culture to secure funding from Finland for the Nordic Resource Centre for the Sami languages.

== Recognition ==
In October 2019, she was one of the "inspiring and influential women" featured in the BBC's 100 Women.

In June 2020, she was shortlisted for the One Young World Journalist of the Year Award.
