= Inger Smuk =

Norwegian politician (born 1947)

Inger Smuk (born 4 April 1947) is a Norwegian politician for the Centre Party.

She served as a deputy representative to the Norwegian Parliament from Finnmark during the term 1993–1997. In total she met during 17 days of parliamentary session.
