= Maja Dunfjeld =

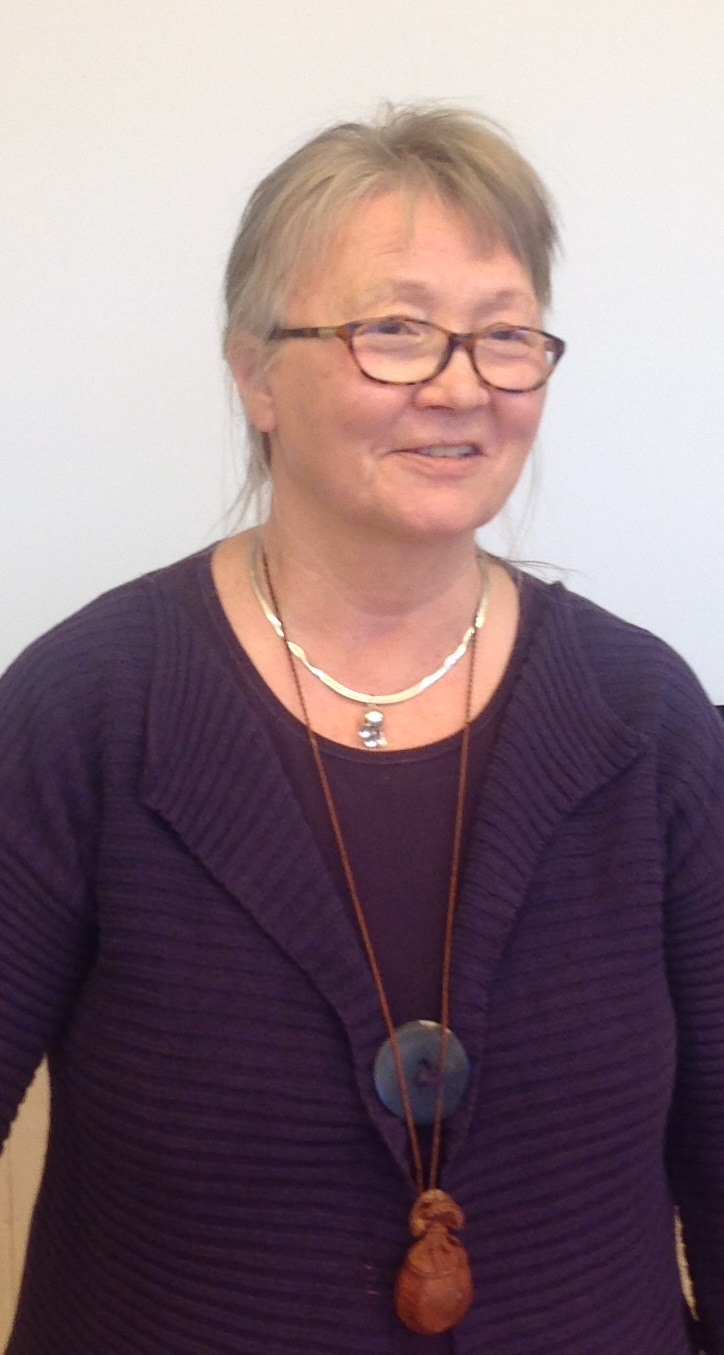
Maja Dunfjeld (2014)

Maja Hilma Dunfjeld (born 20 March 1947) is a South Sami researcher and duodji craftswoman who lives in Harran in central Norway. A graduate of the University of Tromsø, since 1980 she has provided consultative services on duodji art and has lectured at the Duodji Institute, part of the Nordic Sámi Institute.

Dunfjeld was born and raised in Namdalen in Nord-Trøndelag. Specializing in duodji, she earned a doctorate in history of art from the University of Tromsø. Her thesis, Tjaalehtjimmie: form og innhold i sørsamisk ornamentikk, has been published. She was the first to study duodji as her main subject at the National Teachers College for Arts and Crafts in Oslo. In addition to her lecturing and consultative work, she has offered advice on the decoration of a number of public buildings.

== Publications ==
- Dunfjeld, Maja (2001). Tjaalehtjimmie: form og innhold i sørsamisk ornamentikk. Institutt for konsthistorie, Universitetet i Tromsø.
- Dunfjeld, Maja (2007). Njaarke. Harranen giesieakademije. ISBN 978-82-997763-0-1.
