= Marit Myrvoll =

Norwegian Sami social anthropologist

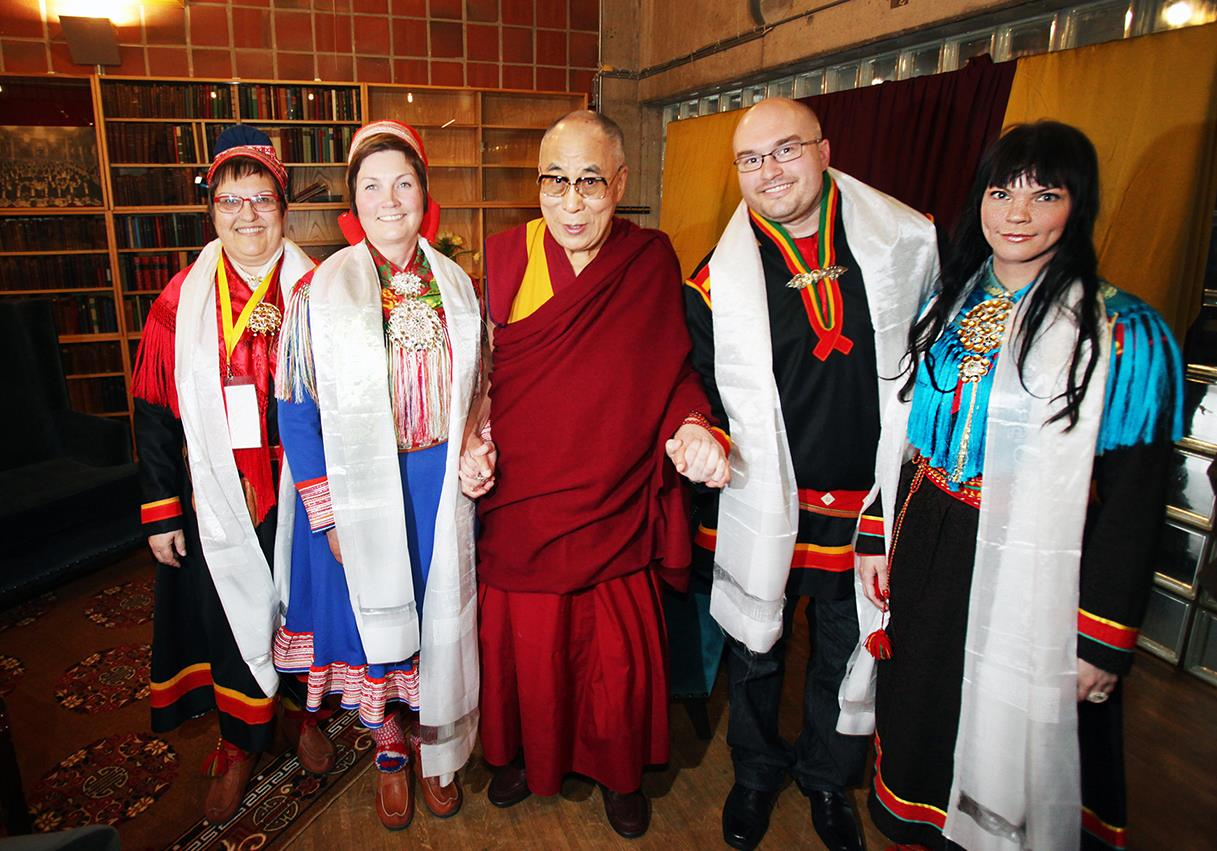
Marit Myrvoll (left) together with the Dalai Lama (centre) in 2014

Marit Myrvoll (born 1953) is a Sami social anthropologist who is researcher at the Sámi Norwegian National Advisory Unit on Mental Health and Substance Use (SANAG/SANKS)/Sami Klinihkka in Northern Norway. For the period 2020 to 2022, she is project leader for the SANAG/SANKS project Vold og overgrep i samiske samfunn (Violence and Abuse in Sami Societies). In the period 2017-2021 she heads the Sami Research Programme at the Research Council of Norway. Myrvoll is also a duojar/Sami handicrafter, and appointed as a member of the Norwegian Truth and Reconciliation Commission.

== Biography ==
Born on 8 December 1953, Marit Myrvoll was raised with her three siblings in Bodø in Norland County by her Sami parents, with Sami culture, traditions and world view as part of this. 17 years old at Bodø High School, she wrote an essay about the Norwegianization of the Sami, aware of the harsh Norwegian assimilation politics towards the Sami people. The engagement for Sami rights never ceased, and in 1976 she attended a Lule Sami language study. After Teachers' College she went on to work as a teacher from 1977 to 1987 apart from a couple of years when she studied North Sami language, as well as Sami culture and ethnic relationships at the University of Tromsø. In 1980, she participated in the establishment of Heargenjargga Sami Searvi (Bodø Sami Association), later renamed Oarje-Saltto Samij Siebrre (Sør-Salten Sami Association), a local branch of the Norwegian Sámi Association (NSR), becoming its first president.

After becoming a mother in 1981, she reduced her political involvement until she attended the annual meeting of the National Sami Association in 1983, later being elected to the organization's adult learning association, Sámi Oahppolihttu. In 1987, she became General Secretary of the NSR, and together with her six-year-old son she moved to Karasjok Municipality where she stayed for the next five years, being engaged in both Sami national as well as pan-Sami and international issues. After the Sami Act was adopted in 1987, she played an active part in preparing for the Sami parliamentary elections in 1989, arranging and speaking at information meetings around the country. In 1989, she began working at the Norwegian Sami Council as head of preparation for the inauguration of the newly elected Sami Parliament. For the next three years, she was an official for the administration of the Sami Parliament.

While studying at the University of Tromsø, Myrvoll wrote a dissertation on the Dalai Lama's democratization process of the Tibetan state in exile (1996). It was based on her 1994 six months' field study at the Tibetan refugee settlements in India where she met the Dalai Lama on several occasions. Their first meeting was in Karasjok in Dec 1989 when Dalai Lama visited the Sami Parliament. Myrvoll has been engaged in the Tibetan freedom movement for over 30 years. In March 2011, she earned a PhD in social anthropology from the University of Tromsø with a thesis titled "Bare gudsordet duger. Om kontinuitet og brudd i samisk virkelighetsforståelse" (Only the word of God counts. On continuity and change in Sami world view). Myrvoll's work and research field mainly comprises Sámi relations from north to south. Myrvoll has for many years worked with the High North, focusing on Nordic and Sámi conditions, world heritage in the Arctic, climate and other change processes with an impact on people, society and heritage, as well as management systems and challenges relating to indigenous peoples and national and international cultural heritage - from local intangible heritage to UNESCO World Heritage Sites. Her key competence includes perspectives on culture, identity and society, as well as the management of cultural heritage, cultural history, societal conditions, religious faith, project management and dissemination. She has participated in National and International projects focusing on identity, cultural heritage and cultural heritage management.
