= Marry A. Somby =

Saami writer from Norway

Marry Ailonieida Sombán Mari
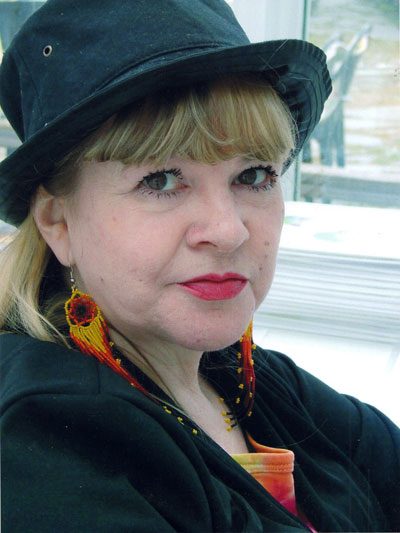
- Occupation: Writer
- Writing career
- Language: Sami
- Genre: Children's literature

Marry Ailonieida Sombán Mari, earlier also known as Mary A. Somby, (born 1953) is a Sami author from Deatnu, Norway. She wrote the first children's book in one of the Sami languages.
