= Kristine Andersen Vesterfjell =

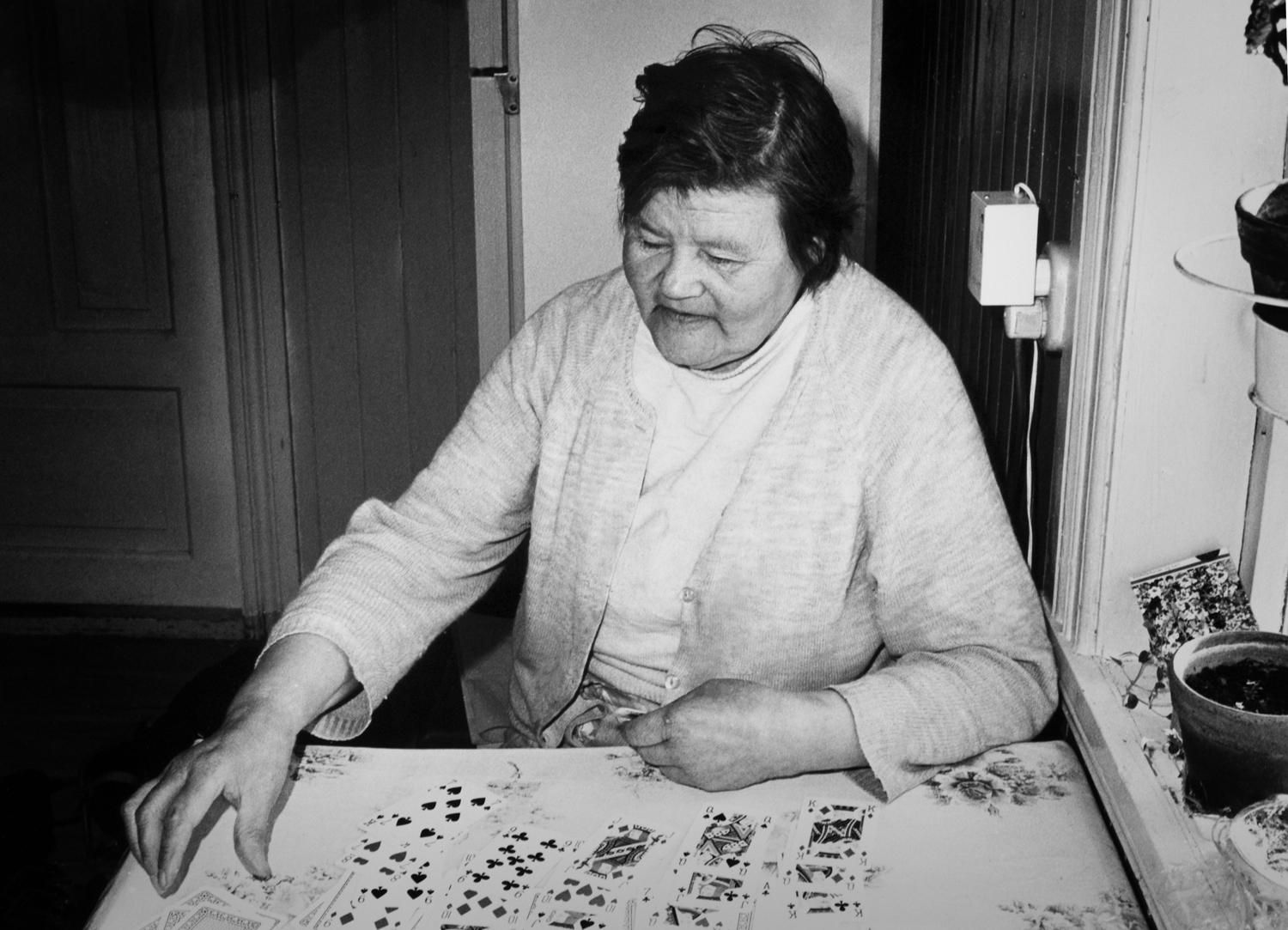
Kristine Andersen Vesterfjell

Kristine Andersen Vesterfjell (sometimes written Westerfjell; 1910–1987) was a Norwegian, Southern Sami reindeer herder and an important advocate for Sámi shamanism and culture. She was from Lomsdalen, in Brønnøy Municipality in Nordland.

== Biography ==
Kristine Andersen Vesterfjell was born in 1910. She lived with her uncle, the reinsamen, Nils Andersen Vesterfjell.

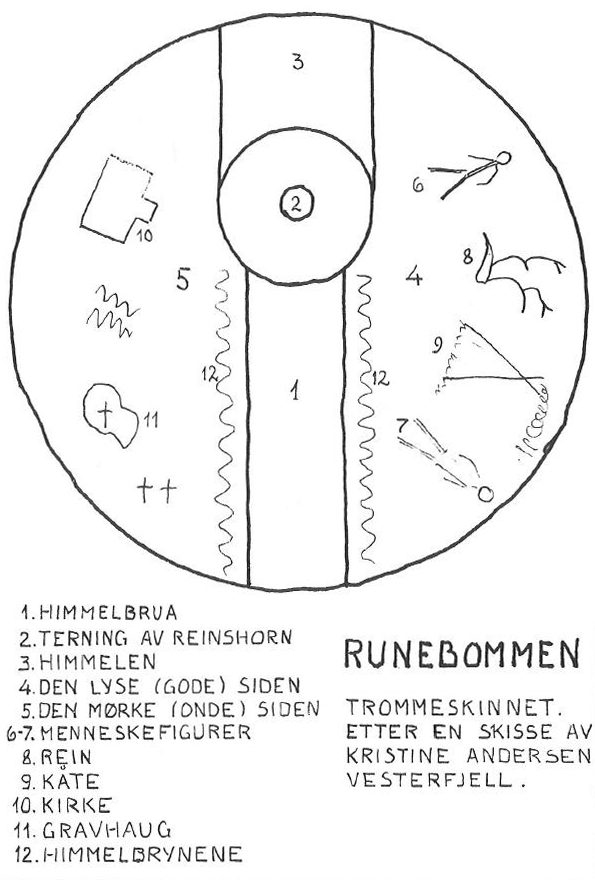
Runebomme fra velfjord

Vesterfjell was one of the central figures that led to the finding of the "Runebomme fra velfjord" (Sámi drum from Velfjord Municipality) in 1969. Although she had never seen the drum in use, she knew where it had been hidden in the early 1900s, what the surface looked like, what the symbols meant, and how runebommes were used in the past. The last user of the runebomme was Nils' grandfather and her great-grandfather, Nils Johan Johannessen Vesterfjell (1819-1871).

Vesterfjell described the location of the drum as follows:—

In Henrikdalen under a large rock lying alone in the terrain. About 0.5 metres (1 ft 8 in) thick and lying on stones. The rock is not easy to spot, but is quite large in extent. Located on the left side, not far from the river. On the other side of the river, there is a forest lake. The stone is below the marsh between two streams.

Working with her, a sketch was made of what the drum skin had looked like, together with explanations of both structure and symbols. In 1969, Arvid Sveli and Herlaug Vonheim went on an expedition into the mountains to find one of the last remaining drums, and found it after an intense exploration in the inaccessible Henrikdalen.

Vesterfjell died in 1987.
