= Hanne Grete Einarsen =

Norwegian Sámi artist

- Born: 1966 (age 59–60)
- Known for: Graphic design

Hanne Grete Einarsen (born 1966) is a Norwegian-Sami artist.

== Biography ==
Hanne Grete Einarsen was born in 1966. She was raised on Skjervøya in northern Troms county, Norway. She studied at the Western Academy of Fine Arts (1991–95) and the University of Bergen (2001–2003). Einarsen studied to be a graphic designer and worked mainly with woodcuts. After a spinal cord injury in 2013, she hired others to produce her graphic expressions.

Since 2006, she has been organizing and running, together with Trond Egil Nilsen, the Snefjord Highland Gathering festival in Snefjord. The main purpose of the festival is to disseminate Scottish and Sami arts and culture. This is done by arranging exhibitions and workshops by and with Sami artists, as well as displaying the Scottish cultural games Highland Games. The festival is held in mid-July each year.

In 2010, the Sami Artists' Association awarded her the John Savio Scholarship, which is presented to Sami artists who have excelled. In 2010, she and her husband, Trond Egil Nilsen, received the Finnmark County Cultural Prize for their dissemination of work aimed at children and young people, among others. In 2014, researchers and directors Beate Bursta and Kristin Nicolaysen premiered the documentary film Kofta & Kilten, which was about the artist couple Hanne Grete Einarsen and Trond Egil Nilsen, with a particular focus on their establishment of Snefjord Highland Gathering.

She has participated in several exhibitions and projects, including the "Expedition of printmakers" which culminated in the exhibition "New prints" which was displayed at Nord Norsk artist center and was exhibited around Northern Norway in 2012. Her latest art project, "Breathe in the Blue", has been exhibited at the Sami Center for Contemporary Art, the Nord-Troms Museum, the Art Association in Alta and Hammerfest, as well as the Nordic House in Reykjavík and the Swedish Fjäll-och Samemuseum in Jokkmokk. She lives in Snefjord in Måsøy Municipality, in western Finnmark county, where she works with her art and runs the cultural industry company "Circus Snefjord 889" with her husband.
