= Signe Iversen =

Norwegian Sami writer

Signe Iversen (born 22 December 1956 in Nesseby Municipality in Finnmark county, Norway) is a Sami language consultant and author of children's literature.

Iversen is best known for her first book, published in 2011 in North Sami as Mánugánda ja Heike ("The Moon Boy and Heike") and translated into Norwegian as Månegutten og Heike. The book was nominated in 2013 for the first annual Nordic Council Children and Young People's Literature Prize in the Sami language category. She originally wrote the book for her daughter, musician Agnete Johnsen, when she was in elementary school. When Agnete brought the book to school to read it to her class, the teacher contacted the author and suggested she publish it. The book is illustrated by Sissel Horndal.

Iversen also works as a language consultant at the Sami language center Isak Saba Center.
