= Karin Stenberg =

Swedish-Sami teacher and activist

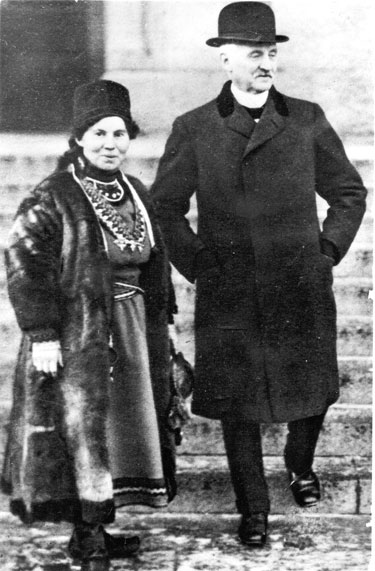
- Karin Stenberg with member of parliament Carl Lindhagen
- Born: Maria Katrina Stenberg; 1 May 1884; Arvidsjaur, Sweden
- Died: 23 March 1969 (aged 84); Arvidsjaur, Sweden

Maria Katrina Stenberg (1 May 1884 - 23 March 1969), commonly known as Karin Stenberg, was a Swedish-Sami teacher and activist in the early Sami unification movement in Sweden.

== Biography ==
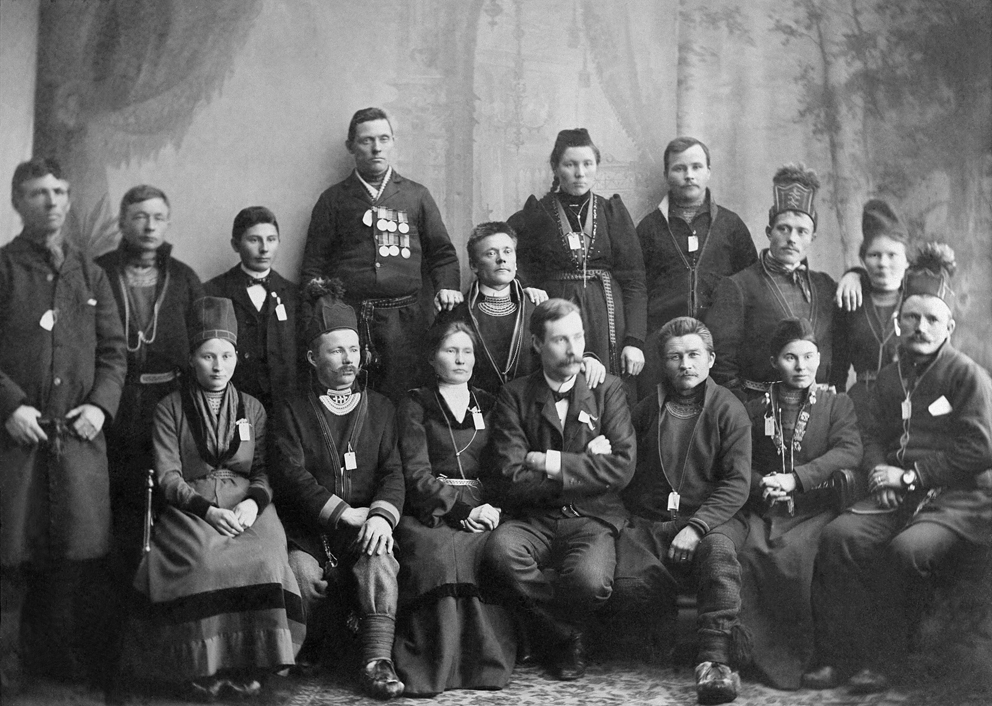
Karin Stenberg (bottom row, second from right) and classmates at a course in Stockholm in January 1905

Karin Stenberg was born in 1884 in Árraksuoloj, Arvidsjaur Municipality, Norrbotten County, to Maria Mattsdotter Stenberg (born 1851) and Jon Nilsson Stenberg (born 1845). Her parents were both Forest Sami from the siida (Sami community) of Västra Kikkejaur in Arvidsjaur.

Stenberg studied at the Sami school for primary school teachers in Mattisudden, Jokkmokk Municipality, graduating in 1904. She spent her entire professional career working as a teacher in Arvidsjaur. In addition to teaching, Stenberg was an active supporter of Sami issues, especially those relating to the Forest Sami. In 1905, she traveled to Stockholm to attend what has been called the "First folk education course for Samis" (Samernas första folkbildningskurs), which was financed in part by politicians Carl and Anna Lindhagen. In 1916, she helped found a Sami association in Arvidsjaur. During Christmas of 1919, she joined several other representatives of the growing Sami movement in meeting with member of parliament Carl Lindhagen, who supported Sami rights.

In 1920, she co-authored the manifesto Dat Läh Mijen Situd!: Det är vår vilja: En vädjan till Svenska Nationen från Samefolket (This Is Our Wish: An Appeal to the Swedish Nation from the Sami People). The purpose of the document was to influence the 1919 Lapp Committee, which was investigating Sami rights and the conditions of reindeer herders.

In the 1930s, Stenberg led a project to save Arvidsjaur's old Sami kyrkstad or lappstad (a group of cabins used when visiting a church overnight), which was threatened by road construction. The lappstad is today preserved as a historical site.

In 1942, Stenberg and Reverend Gustav Park led an initiative to open the Sami Folk High School (Swedish: Samernas Folkhögskola), a folk high school for the Sami in Sorsele, Västerbotten County. The school is still in operation and has been known since 1999 as the Sami Education Center (Swedish: Samernas utbildningscentrum, Sami: Sámij åhpadusguovdásj) She was also a leader in the Sami organization Same Ätnam, which was founded in Jokkmokk in 1945.

Stenberg received several awards over the course of her life, including the Royal Patriotic Society's medal, the Olof Högberg Award, and the Swedish Craft Association's silver medal. She was also a member of the Order of Vasa, first class.
