= Marja Bål Nango =

Norwegian Sami filmmaker

- Born: 1988; Oslo
- Awards: Young Artist of the Year (Katarina Barruk, Niillas Holmberg, 2011)

Marja Bål Nango (born 1988) is a Norwegian Sami filmmaker who has created several short films. In October 2013, her Før hun kom, etter han dro (Before She Came, After He Left) won the Ellen Monague Award For Best Youth Work at the imagineNATIVE Film and Media Arts Festival in Toronto. More recently, at the 2019 Tromsø International Film Festival, she won the best debut award for Njuokčamat (The Tongues), a 15-minute drama about the experiences of a Sami woman out in a snowstorm.

== Biography ==
Born in Oslo in 1988, Marja Bål Nango was brought up in a family of Sami reindeer herders in the village of Skibotn in Troms County Municipality in the far north of Norway. She was trained in filmmaking at the Nordland kunst- og filmfagskole (Northland Art and Film School) in Kabelvåg and at the Film and Television School in Lillehammer. While still studying, in 2011 she directed De abstrakte, a short film which was shown at the Cinematek in Oslo. In 2012, thanks to a three-year grant from the Sami Cultural Council (Samisk Kunstnerråd], she was able to continue her education, creating Før hun kom, etter han dro (2012) which won an award at the imgineNATIVE festival in Toronto the following year.

In 2014, she directed Halvt ditt, halvt datt (Half of This and Half of That) on the multicultural problems experienced by the Samis. O.M.G. – Oh máigon girl (2015) was shown at the Tromsø Festival where it won the Rookie Award and went on to be included in the Nord-program films shown in St Petersburg and Moscow. In 2018, Nango was one of 12 filmmakers selected to take part in UP, a development programme for female filmmakers aimed at achieving better balance between male and female participants in Norwegian films.

At the 2019 Tromsø International Film Festival, she won the best debut award for Njuokčamat (The Tongues), a 15-minute drama about the experiences of a Sami woman who was raped while out in a snowstorm.
