= Marja-Liisa Olthuis =

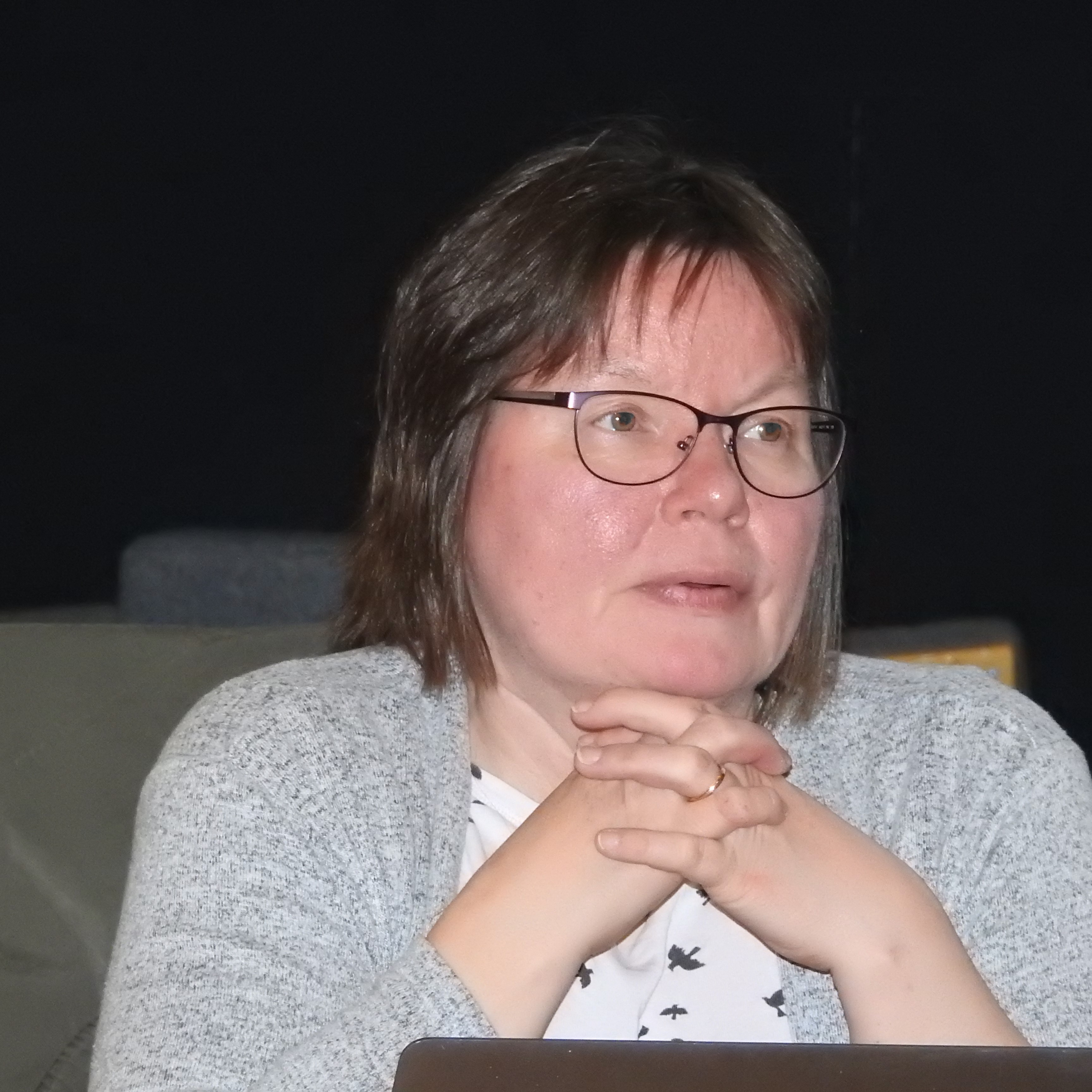
- Born: August 9, 1967 (age 58); Partakko, Inari, Finland

Marja-Liisa Olthuis (née Mujo; born August 9, 1967, in Partakko, Inari, Finland) is an Inari Sámi linguist, academic, translator, and writer, who currently lives in the Netherlands with her Dutch husband and children. She received the Israel Ruong Scholarship from the Sámi Institute in 1999. On April 14, 2007, she became the first Inari Sámi to successfully defend a doctoral thesis about the Inari Sámi language in Inari Sámi. On 21 February 2020 she was awarded the Linguapax Prize.

== Bibliography ==
- Olthuis, Marja-Liisa. Evangelium Matteus mield (1995)
- Olthuis, Marja-Liisa. Kielâoppâ (2000)
- Olthuis, Marja-Liisa. Kaksitavuiset pohjoissaamen -mi- ja inarinsaamen -mi/-me -nomiinit ja niiden alkuperä (2001)
- Olthuis, Marja-Liisa. Sämikielâ sänikirje suomâ-säämi (2005)
- Olthuis, Marja-Liisa. Sämikielâ sänikirje säämi-suoma ja suomâ-säämi (2005)
- Olthuis, Marja-Liisa. Inarinsaamen lajinnimet lintujen ja sienten kansannimitysten historiaa ja oppitekoisten uudisnimien muodostuksen metodiikkaa (2007)
