= Agneta Andersson (artist) =

Swedish Sámi artist and art educator

Agneta Andersson (born 1958) is a Swedish Sámi artist and art educator.

She was born in Kiruna and received a MFA in textile art from the University of Gothenburg. She pursued further studies at Umeå University and Luleå University of Technology in art theory and history, project management and various artistic media. She works in sculpture as well as producing two dimensional works in textiles, glass and metal. She has taught art in high school as well as giving workshops and courses in the visual arts field.

She has received a number of commissions for art in public spaces including the Sami sculpture park in Jokkmokk.

Andersson received the 2010 Culture Prize. In 2007, she received a Rubus arcticus grant.
