= Anne Nuorgam =

Finnish Sámi politician and lawyer (born 1964)

- Born: 22 December 1964 (age 61)
- Occupation: politician

Anne Nuorgam (born 22 December 1964) is a Finnish Sami politician, member of the Sámi Parliament of Finland since 2000 and current Chair of the United Nations Permanent Forum on Indigenous Issues since 22 April 2019 after being elected in the 18th session.

She has also chaired the Saami Council from 2001 to 2002.

== Biography ==
Nuorgam was born in Utsjoki and has a master's degree in Law and is a public law researcher at the University of Lapland, particularly of Sami law. She has two daughters (born in 1987 and 2003).

Anne Nuorgam is a member of the United Nations Permanent Forum on Indigenous Peoples since 10 June 2016 where she represents the Arctic indigenous: the Sami and Inuit.
