= Elisabeth Erke =

Norwegian Sami educator and politician

Member of the Sámi Parliament of Norway
- Incumbent
- Assumed office 2017
- Constituency: Eastern

Deputy Mayor of Tana
- Incumbent
- Assumed office 2017

Personal details
- Born: September 8, 1962 (age 64)
- Party: Centre Party (until 2003; 2018–present); Labour Party (2003–2018)
- Education: Alta Teacher's College; University of Oslo
- Occupation: Educator, politician

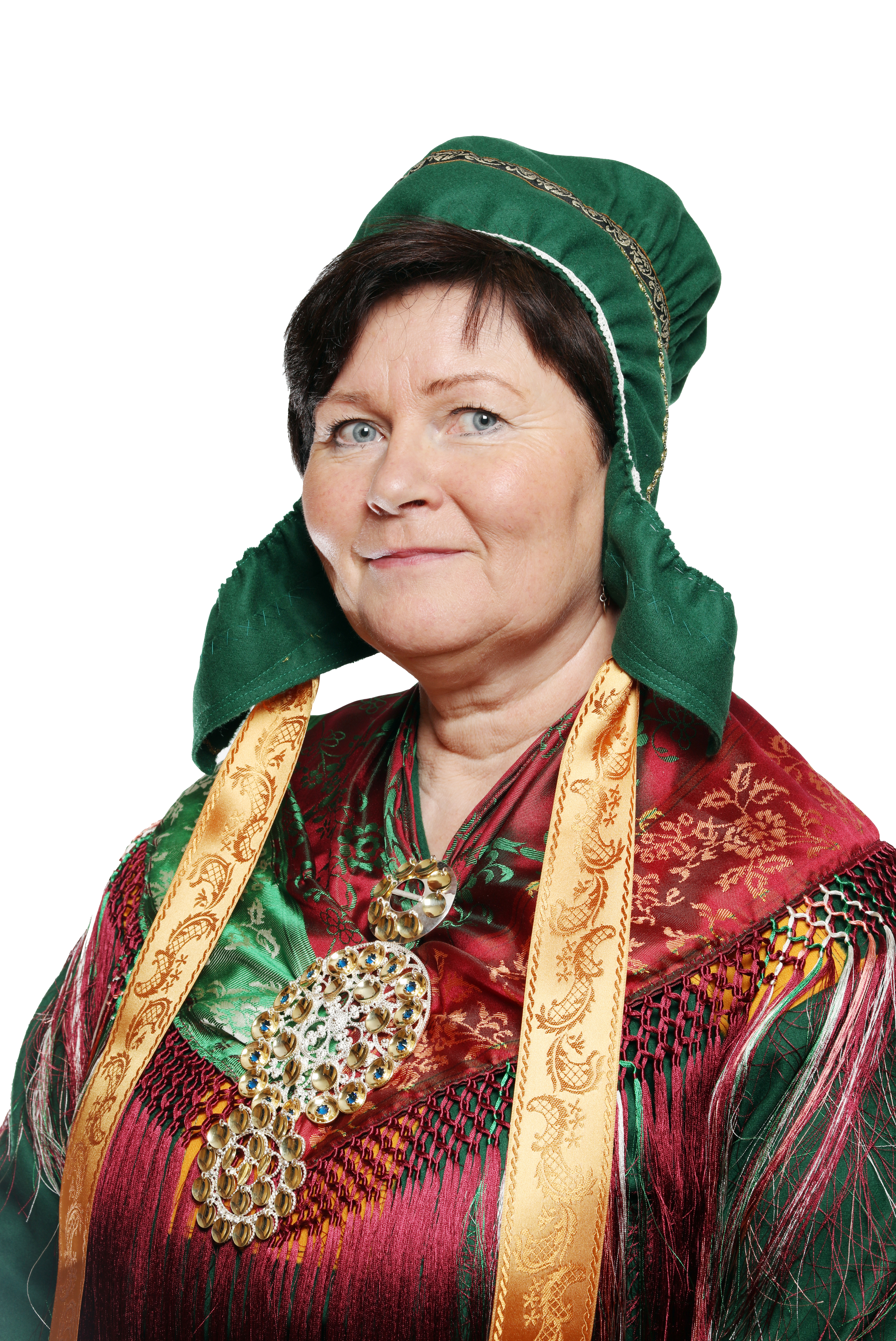
Elisabeth Erke (2017)

Elisabeth Erke (born 8 September 1962) is a Norwegian Sami educator and politician.

== Biography ==
Erke was educated as a teacher at Alta Teacher's College in the 1980s, before continuing her education in special education, mentoring, and coaching. Her master's in pedagogy (on politics and feminism) was at the University of Oslo. She began her political activity when, as a teacher student in Alta, she sat on the national board for Norwegian Teacher Students. From 1997 to 2001, she was a deputy representative at the Sami Parliament, at that time, for the Center Party. She transitioned to the AP in 2003. Afterwards, she was elected to the municipal council in Tana, where, from 2017, she is deputy mayor. From 1998 to 2012 she lived part of her time in Switzerland. She worked in elementary school in Akershus, Oslo, and Tana. She also served as principal at the private New School in Oslo. From 2013, she has worked as museum director in the Tana Museum. From 2017, Erke has been a member of the Sámi Parliament of Norway. She was elected from the Eastern constituency, where she was at the head of the Labour Party (AP). In May 2018, she resigned from the AP and resigned as plenary leader at the Sami Parliament. Later that same year, she joined the Center Party.
