= Stor-Stina =

Sámi woman noted for her tall height

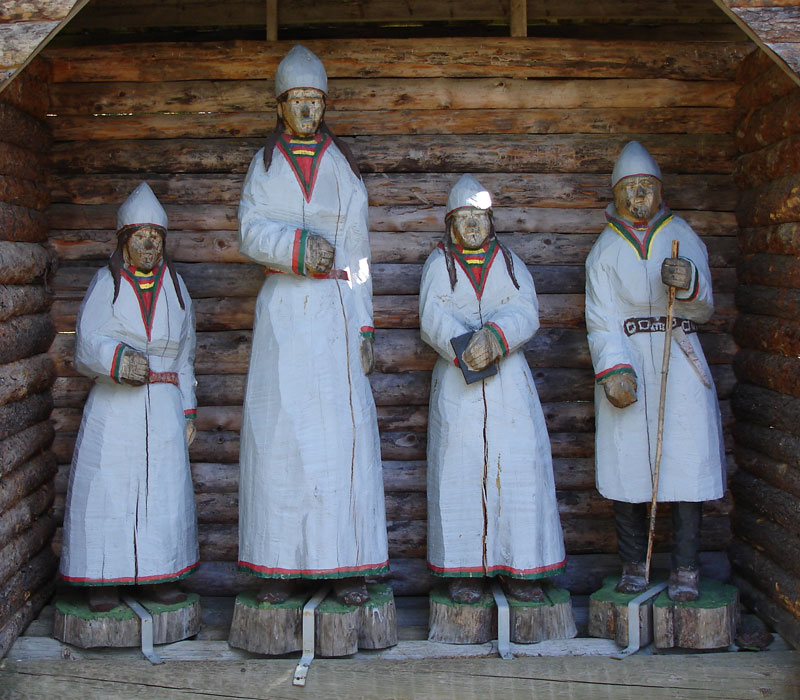
Monument over Stor-Stina at Brännäs in Malå.

Kristina Katarina "Stina Kajsa" Larsdotter (19 January 1819, in Brännäs, Malå – 27 May 1854), known as Långa lappflickan ("the tall Lappish girl"), The Lapland Giantess, and Stor-Stina ("Big Stina"), was a Sámi woman from Sweden, who aroused great attention among her contemporaries because of her height.

== Early life ==
Kristina Katarina "Stina Kajsa" Larsdotter was born on 19 January 1819 in Brännäs, Malå, Sweden. She was the second child of Lars Sjulsson and Carin Larsdotter. Her father was a widower with four children from his first marriage, and Kristina Katarina Larsdotter grew up with her older sister, Sara Kajsa Larsdotter, and four half-siblings.

Larsdotter first began to appear regularly in surviving written records in 1837, when she travelled to Stockholm with her parents and sister.

== Medical condition ==
Larsdotter was unusually tall from an early age and continued to grow throughout her life. Despite her height, she was often in poor health as a child, experiencing recurring pain, fainting spells, and swelling in her legs that sometimes confined her to bed. By the age of 18, she had not yet begun to menstruate.

Following an examination at the Karolinska Institutet in Stockholm in 1837, anatomist Anders Retzius measured Larsdotter's height at 202 centimetres (6 feet 8 inches). He also measured her parents, recording her father as 163 centimetres (5 feet 4 inches) tall and her mother as 133 centimetres (4 feet 4 inches). Retzius described her condition as "giant growth", the medical terminology used at the time for abnormal overgrowth.

Larsdotter continued to grow after the examination. Sixteen years later, in 1853, a newspaper in Newcastle upon Tyne, England, reported that she was 218 centimetres (7 feet 2 inches) tall and weighed 146 kilograms (322 pounds). Modern sources generally describe her condition as presumed gigantism, although the exact cause has never been identified.

== Career ==
From 1837 onward, she toured Sweden, Great Britain, Denmark, France and Russia exhibiting herself for money under the stage name "The Lapland Giantess - Tallest Woman in the World".

Stor-Stina eventually returned to her family in Brännäs in Malå.

== Death ==
She died of gangrene.

== Legacy ==
She is portrayed in the 1981 novel Långa lappflickan by Åke Lundgren, the 2012 novel Rekviem för en vanskapt by Mattias Hagberg and the 2024 graphic novel Stinas jojk by Mats Jonsson.
