= Lars Pirak =

Swedish Sámi artist (1932–2008)

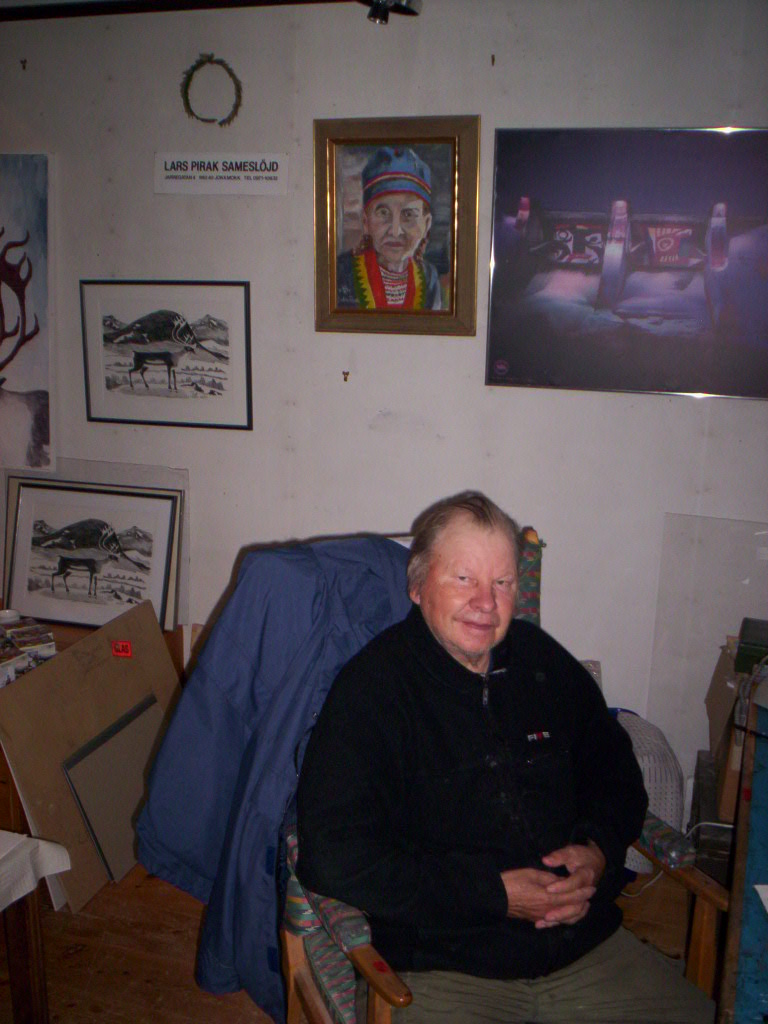
Lars Pirak and his work

Lars Pirak (27 July 1932 – 2 October 2008) was a Lule and North Sámi artist, yoiker and duodji master from Jokkmokk, Sweden. The Faculty of Arts at the University of Umeå conferred an honorary Doctorate on Pirak in 2003 in recognition of his contribution to the Sámi culture.

== Early life ==
Pirak was born to a family in the Tuorpon siida. He grew up at Luovaluokta near Lake Karats in Sweden. Already at the age of 18 he was known for his skills in Sámi duodji. In addition to his work with the traditional Sámi materials, he also painted with both watercolors and oil. Pirak created works of art for the Sámi Folk High School (Swedish: Samernas folkhögskola) in Jokkmokk and for the town hall in Piteå. He also has pieces in museums across the world.

=== Saltripa ===
The Saltripa is one of Pirak's most well-known designs. These white salt cellars are crafted in the shape of a ptarmigan; they were originally made from reindeer antler and later, silver. The bowl forms the body of the ptarmigan and the spoon is its tail.
