= Karen Anette Anti =

Norwegian Sami politician

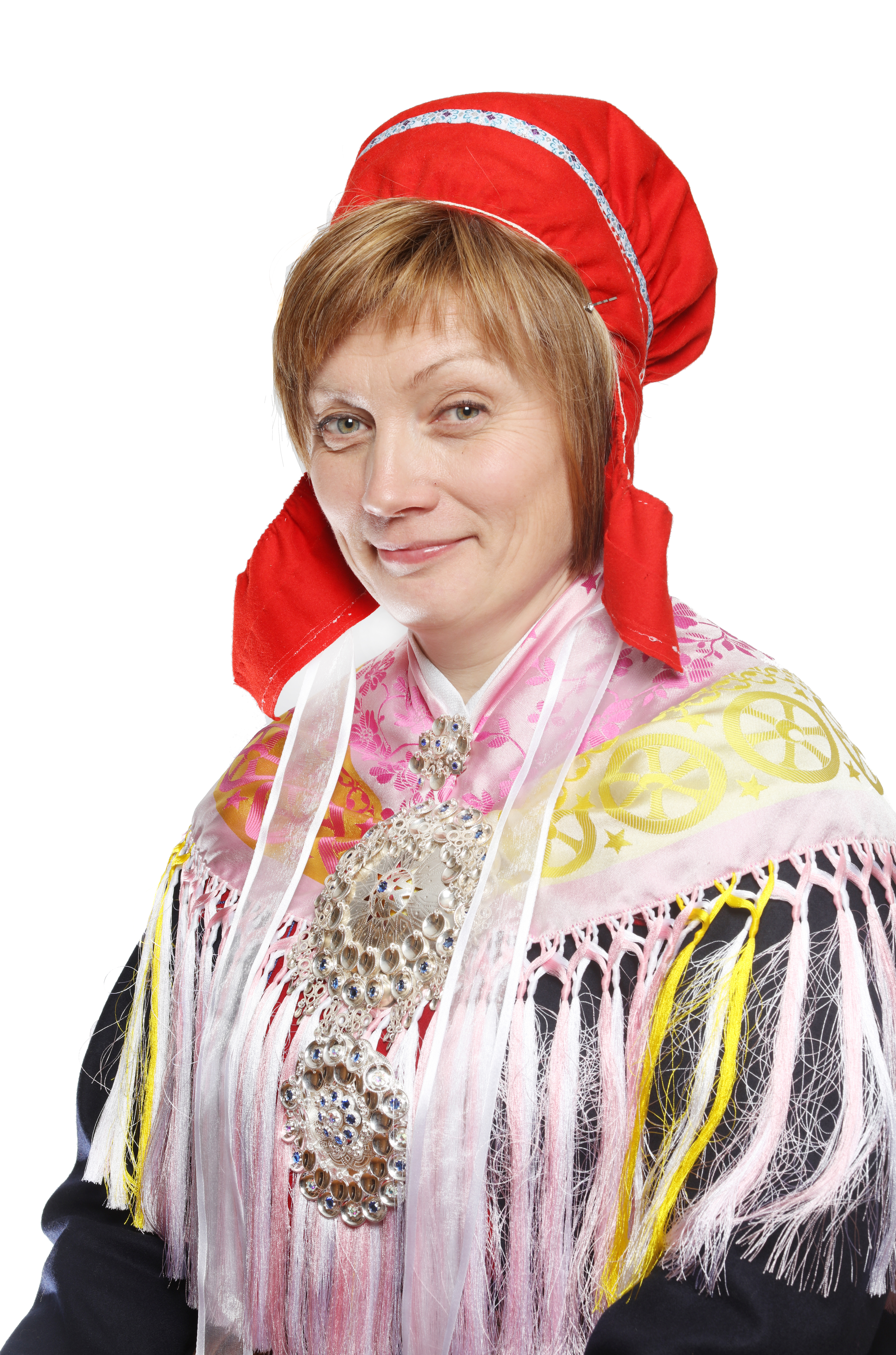
- Anti in 2017
- Born: 1972 (age 53–54)
- Occupation: Politician

Karen Anette Anti (born 1972) is a Norwegian Sami politician. From 2017, she has been a member of the Sámi Parliament of Norway. She was elected to the Norwegian Sami National Assembly from the Gáisi constituency as the first Norwegian Sámi Association representative from Målselv Municipality.
