= Ellen-Sylvia Blind =

Ellen-Sylvia Blind (1925–2009) was a Swedish Sami writer who grew up in a family of reindeer herders. She is remembered for contributing to the Sami languages by recording her memories of Sami life in her native northern Sami. A devout Christian, she wrote poems, some of which have been set to music.

== Biography ==
Born on 12 July 1925 in Jukkasjärvi, Kiruna Municipality, in the far north of Sweden, Ellen-Sylvia Blind was brought up in family of reindeer herders where she spoke northern Sami as her mother tongue. In 1946, she married Lars-Johan Blind, also a reindeer herder, with whom she had six children. They continued to live in northern Sweden for the rest of their lives. Ellen-Sylvia ran the home but also participated in traditional crafts such as sewing.

After attending the Sami adult education school in Jokkmokk, she was able to write books in her native language. In 1976, she recorded her memoires, including her years at school, in Muitot ja jur’dagat (Memories and Thoughts), where she commented on the discrimination the Samis experienced, especially when they were forbidden to use their own language. A devout Christian, she went on to publish Mu osku ja eallin (My Faith and My Life) in 1981. Of particular interest is her Sogas sohkii (Family to Family) in which she stresses her wish to preserve Sami traditions for younger generations. She was also a profuse poet, several of her poems being set to music.

Ellen-Sylvia Blind died on 5 May 2009 and is buried in the cemetery at Arjeplog.
