= Maria Magdalena Mathsdotter =

Swedish Sami education activist

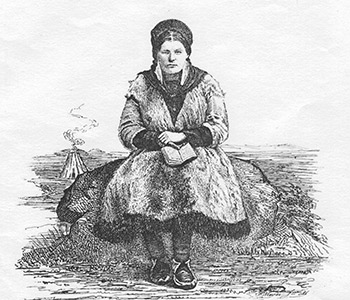
- from an 1864 newspaper
- Born: 21 March 1835
- Died: 31 March 1873 (aged 38); Nätra

Maria Magdalena Mathsdotter (21 March 1835 – 31 March 1873) was a Swedish Sami who in 1864 took the initiative to the foundation of schools for Sami children in Lapland.

== Life ==
Mathsdotter was born 21 March 1835 in Dal parish (present Kramfors Municipality). She came from a poor background with her father looking after reindeer during their migration back and forth from summer to winter. She attended school in very poor conditions in 1843 and 1844.

In the winter of 1864, Maria Magdalena Mathsdotter traveled from her home in Åsele to Stockholm on skies and by foot to ask for an audience with the monarch. She arrived in February. She was given a meeting with both the monarch, Charles XV of Sweden, as well as with the Queen, Louise of the Netherlands, and the Queen dowager, Josephine of Leuchtenberg. Her purpose was to organize a new school boarding system for the Sami children. Previously, Sami children had been forced to learn Christianity and other legally mandatory subjects in schools long from home and their parents, since there were no schools for them in Lapland. This also had the consequence that their schooling was very shallow, as it often became but a short schooling under those circumstances. Her initiative was approved and a society, the so-called Femöresföreningen ("five penny association"), was founded to finance a school in Vilhelmina in 1865, which was to be the first of many. Her initiative was viewed upon as a virtuous wish for the Samis to be better educated within religion, and she was therefore officially celebrated as a role model. She was described as modest and humble, as she did not wish for her name to be made public.

Mathsdotter made contact with a pastor from the French Reformed Church in Stockholm, Henri Roehrich, who assisted her. Her trip resulted in the establishment of two schools and orphanages.

In 1866 she travelled again to Stockholm and although she did not again meet the King she wanted to meet Pastor Roehrich again. This time she was concerned that settlers were overriding the rights of the Sami in Wilhelmina. She was put in contact with Erik Viktor Almquist who was the local governor in Vasterbottens in northern Sweden.. He took up Mathsdotter's case and in 1871 the law was changed to establish better rights for the Sami people.

The effort of Maria Mathsdotter created great attention also internationally, and she was portrayed in the press in Germany, Great Britain, France, The Netherlands and Switzerland, where new collections of funds for the schools were made. In France, the paper "La Laponie et Maria Mathsdotter" was printed. The Netherlands were particularly interested in contributing with funds, and Maria Mathsdotter was included in a contemporary dictionary of notable Swedish women.
