= Sollaug Sárgon =

Norwegian Sami poet (born 1965)

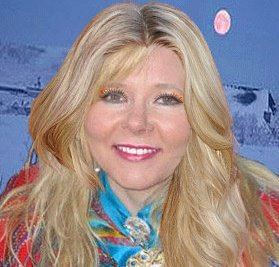
- Born: 20 October 1965 (age 60); Guovdageaidnu, Norway
- Education: Child protective pedagogy
- Occupation: Poet

Sollaug Sárgon (born 20 October 1965) is a Norwegian Sami poet.

Sárgon was born in Guovdageainnu Municipality and is educated as child protective pedagogue. She writes in Northern Sami, and made her literary debut in 2010 with the poetry collection Savvon bálgáid luottastit, which eventually was nominated for the Nordic Council's Literature Prize for the Sámi languages in 2013. In 2017 she published her second poetry collection, ii čága čihkosii.
