= Lajla Mattsson Magga =

Southern Sami teacher, children's writer and lexicographer

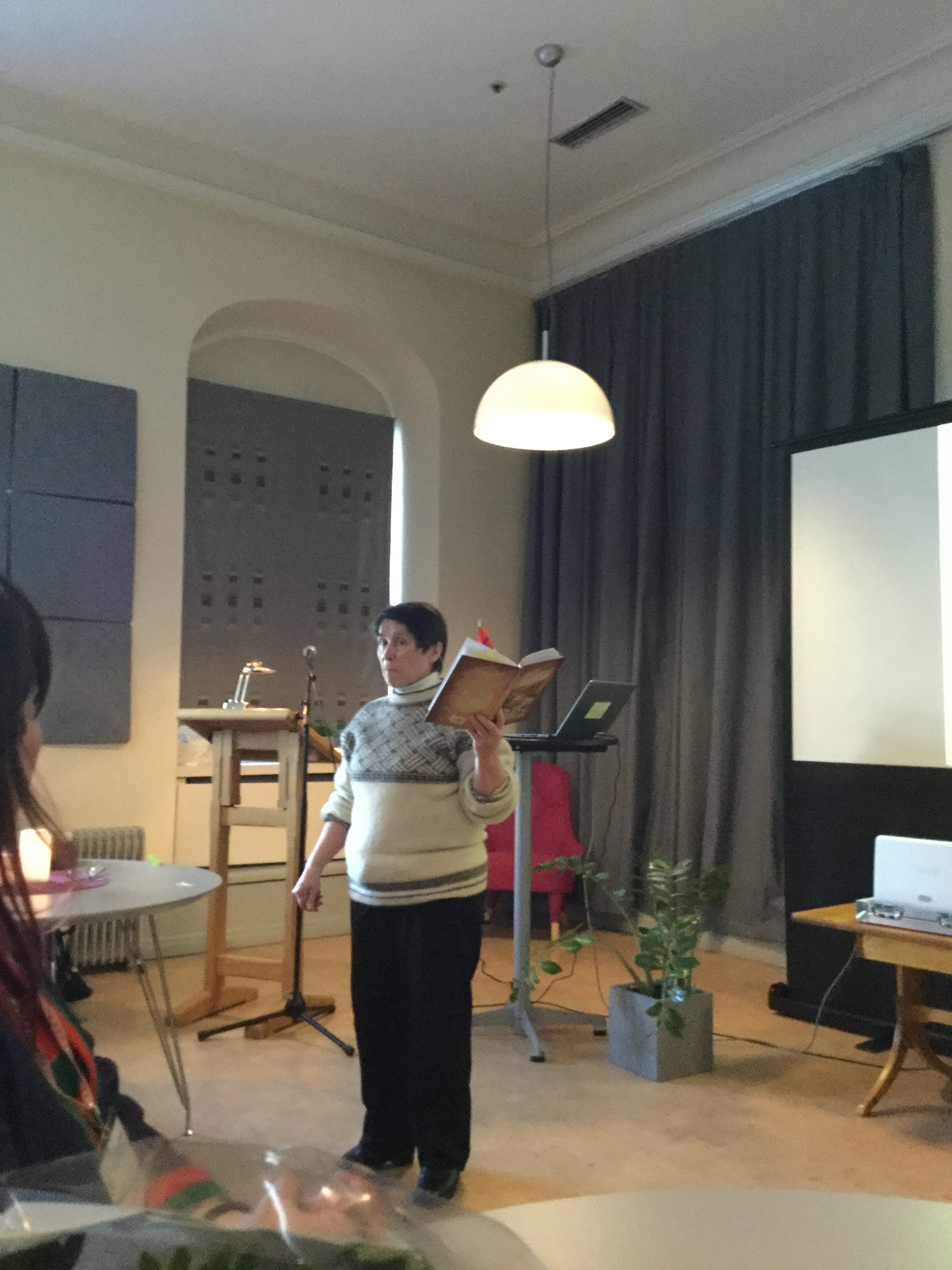
Magga presenting her latest book during Tråante 2017.

Lajla Mattsson Magga (born 4 November 1942) is a Southern Sami teacher, children's writer and lexicographer. Married to fellow Sami linguist Ole Henrik Magga (born 1947), she lives in Kautokeino Municipality in the far northern Norwegian county of Finnmark.

== Biography ==
Born in Kall in central Sweden's Åre Municipality, Magga is the daughter of the reindeer herder Gustaf Edvard Mattson (1897–1973) and Elin Margareta Larsson (1887–1973), also a reindeer herder. A qualified teacher, she attended the University of Oslo where she studied the South Sami language. She has a wide field of interest, comprising fiction and non-fiction, translation, teaching, acquisition of language material, and lexicography. In addition to teaching South Sami in both Norway and Sweden, she has acted as an examiner for the Nord-Trøndelag University College.

In 1984, she published her first book Maahke ryöknie, followed by other children's books and textbooks. Magga has carried out research on the South Sami language and its terminology, leading for example to the standardization of place names.

In 1993, together with Knut Bergsland, she published the Southern Sami-Norwegian dictionary Åarjelsaemiendaaroen baakoegaerja/Sydsamisk-norsk ordbok. She had also published children's books in the South Sami language as well as a Norwegian-South Sami dictionary.

In 2010, Magga was awarded the Nordic Sami language prize, Gollegiella. Not only had Magga taught Southern Sami for many years, she had also published dictionaries. She was currently working on a translation of the Bible into South Sami and was writing a grammar of South Sami together with her husband.
