= Rauni Magga Lukkari =

Sámi poet and translator

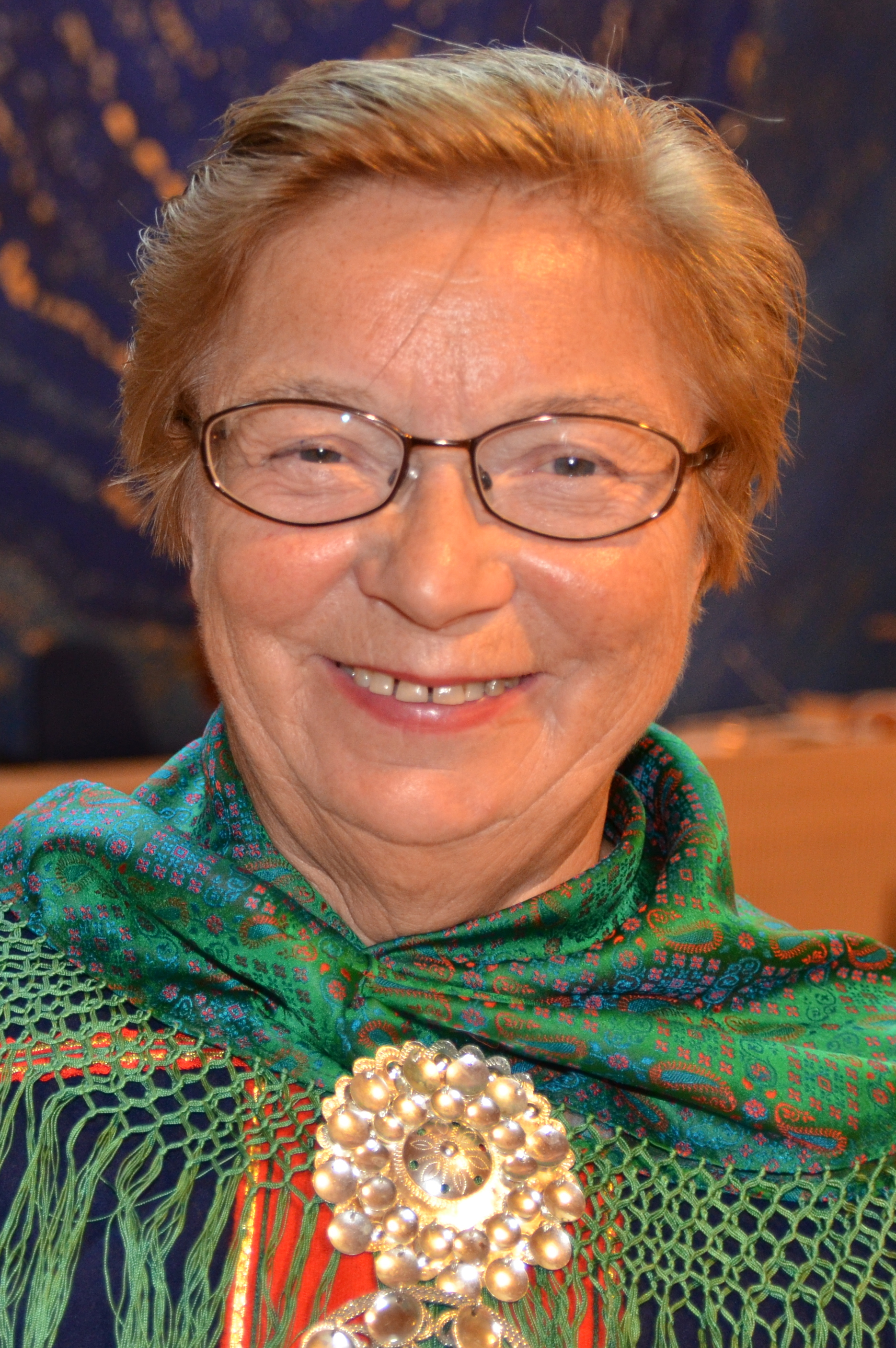
- Born: 30 January 1943 (age 82); Utsjoki, Lapland Province, Finland
- Occupation(s): Poet, translator
- Awards: King's Medal of Merit

Rauni Magga Lukkari is a Sámi poet and translator. Although she was born in Vetsikko, Utsjoki, Finland in 1943, she has lived in Tromsø, Norway since 1980. Lukkari writes in Northern Sami.

== Works ==
=== Books ===
- Jieŋat vulget (1980)
- Báze dearvan, Biehtar (1981)
- Losses beaivegirji (1986)
- Mu gonagasa gollebiktasat (1991)
- Čalbmemihttu (1995)
- Árbeeadni (1996)
- Dearvvuođat (1999)

=== Translations ===
- Laila Stien: Olle P ja imas beaivvás (1991)
- Einar Bragi: Vaikke jiehkki jávkkodivccii (1998)
- Marion Palmer: Utsatte strök/Rasis guovllut (1999)
- Kati-Claudia Fofonoff Eana áđai nuppebeliid (2000)
- Dás álget johtolagat. Barents guovllu antologia (2001, translation into Northern Sámi by Jovnna-Ánde Vest, Rauni Magga Lukkari and Petter Johanas Lukkari)
- Riina Katajavuori: Gii halla (2004, translation into Northern Sámi by Rauni Magga Lukkari and Petter Johanas Lukkari)
- Edith Södergran: Manin munnje eallin addui (2004, translation into Northern Sámi by Rauni Magga Lukkari and Petter Johanas Lukkari)
