= Sandra Andersen Eira =

Norwegian Sami politician (born 1986)

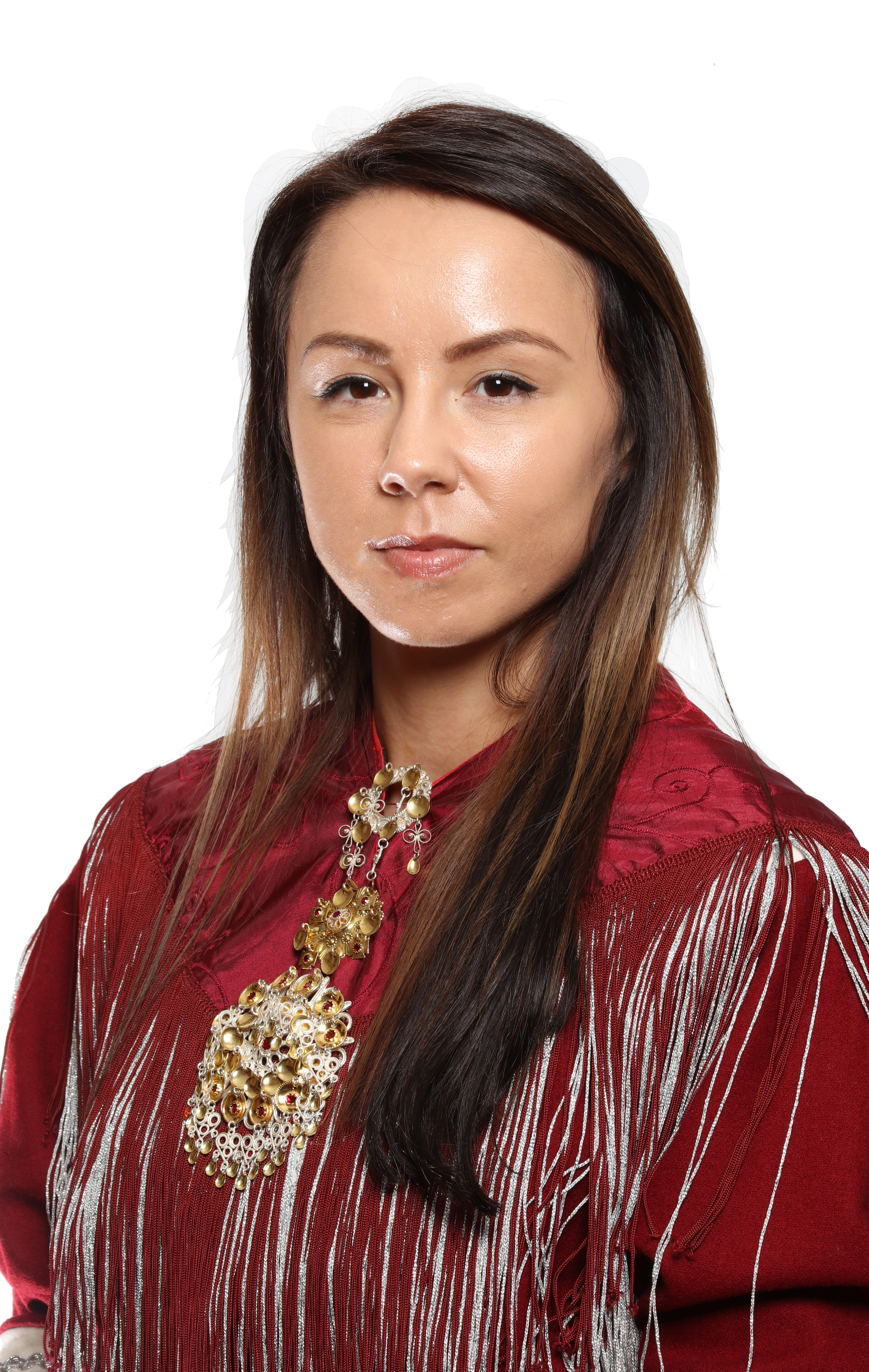
- Sandra Andersen Eira in 2017

Member of the Sámi Parliament of Norway for Ávjovárri
- In office 2017–2021

Personal details
- Born: 21 June 1986 (age 40)
- Citizenship: Norwegian
- Military career
- Allegiance: Ukraine
- Branch: Main Directorate of Intelligence: Ukrainian Marine Corps; 36th Marine Brigade (Reconnaissance Company); 37th Marine Brigade (Assault Company)
- Service years: 2022–present
- Rank: Soldat (GUR) / Matros (Marines)
- Conflicts: Russo-Ukrainian War; Russian invasion of Ukraine

Sandra Andersen Eira (born 21 June 1986) is a fisherwoman and Norwegian Sámi politician from Russenes in Porsanger Municipality in Finnmark county, Norway. As of 2024 she is serving in the Ukrainian Marine Corps.

== Biography ==
Andersen Eira was raised in the Arctic region of Northern Norway. From 2017 to 2021, Andersen Eira served as a member of the Sámi Parliament of Norway (Sametinget), elected to the Norwegian Sámi Association from the Ávjovárri constituency.

Following the end of her term in the Sametinget, Andersen Eiraspent a year commuting between the United States and Norway, including expanding her fishing business and being featured in a documentary titled Sea Sisters.

During the Russian invasion of Ukraine, Andersen Eira joined a mixed-British and American ranger squad, arriving in Ukraine in March 2022. She was part of the GUR as a Soldat and currently works in the Ukrainian Marines as Matros. As of September 2024, Andersen Eira was still fighting for Ukraine; she has been back to Norway at least once, for a few days, to attend a plenary session of the Sámi Parliament of Norway.

Andersen Eira took part, along with her unit, in the battle of Moshchun, near Kyiv and on the frontline in Mykolaiv in March 2022 and was later deployed to Bakhmut, in the Donbas, for a brief period. She was deployed in Donetsk frontline in 2023 and was part alongside units of the Ukrainian Armed Forces in the battle of Krynky (2023/2024), a battle that left at least 1,000 Ukrainian soldiers dead or missing. In 2024, Russia issued an arrest warrant against her on charges of being a "mercenary".

On 28 May 2025, Norwegian broadcaster TV2 announced that Andersen Eira is expecting a child following her marriage to a fellow Ukrainian soldier in 2024. She gave birth to a boy on August 27.

On 24 June 2025, she appeared as a guest on the Wolfgang Wee Uncut podcast, where she spoke about her experiences as a Norwegian volunteer soldier in Ukraine.
