= Asa Kitok =

Swedish Sami birch-root weaver

Asa Kitok (née Persdotter Vitsak; 5 March 1894 – 22 December 1986) was a Swedish Sami artisan who reintroduced the art of working with birch roots. She had learnt birch-root weaving as a child at a time when it was close to disappearing. Her achievements have led to the Asa Kitok Scholarship which is awarded annually to Sami artisans working in Sweden.

== Biography ==
Born on 5 March 1894 in Sörkaitums sameby (now Unna tjerusj), a village in the Gällivare Municipality of northern Sweden, Kitok pioneered the reintroduction of the art of birch-root weaving, one of the oldest crafts of the Sami people. Thanks to her fine craftsmanship, which she passed on to her daughters, it has now become an important aspect of Sami culture. Today the art continues to be practised and is taught at the Sami training centre in Jokkmokk.

Kitok died in Gällivare on 22 December 1986.

== Family ==
Asa Kitok was married to Anders Kitok (1868–1934). She had two daughters, Margit Kitok-Åström (1925–2011) and Ellen Kitok Andersson (1933–2008).

== Scholarship ==
In 2005, Sámi Duodji, the handicrafts department of the Sámi Council, created the annual Asa Kitok Scholarship in her memory. It is awarded annually to Sami artisans in Sweden.
