= Monica Edmondson =

Sami glass artist

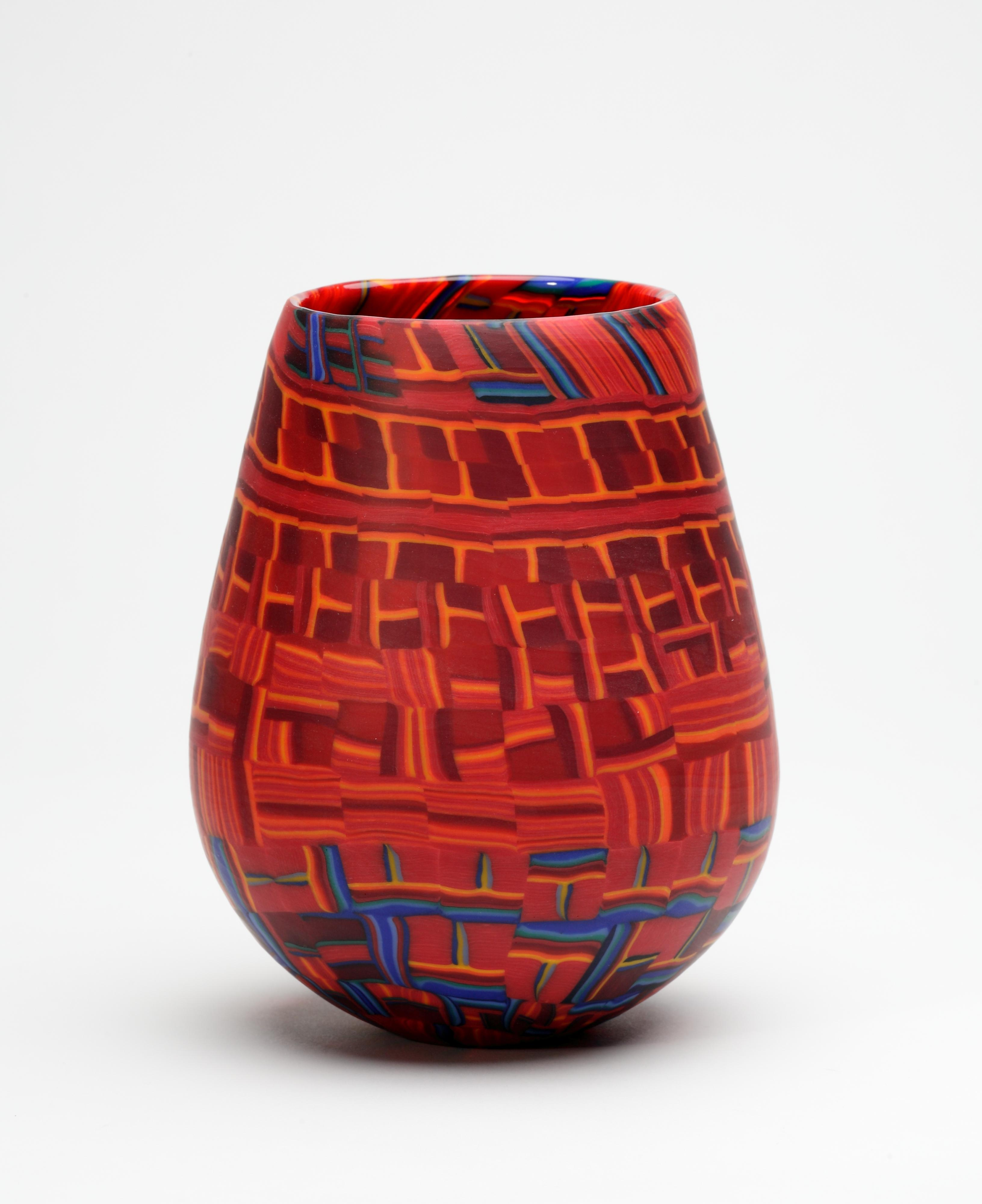
Past - Present - Future, glas vase by Monica Edmondson

Monica L. Edmondson (born 1963 in Gällivare) is a Sami woman known for glass art. She attended Australian National University. One of her works is called 100 Migratory.
