= Berit Oskal Eira =

Norwegian politician (1951–2021)

Berit Oskal Eira (1 March 1951 – 26 January 2021) was a Sami politician for the Labour Party.

She was elected to the Sami Parliament of Norway in 2001.

From 2005 to 2007, while the second cabinet Stoltenberg held office, she was appointed State Secretary in the Ministry of Labour and Social Inclusion.
