= Sosnovka, Murmansk Oblast =

Sosnovka Сосновка
- Selo
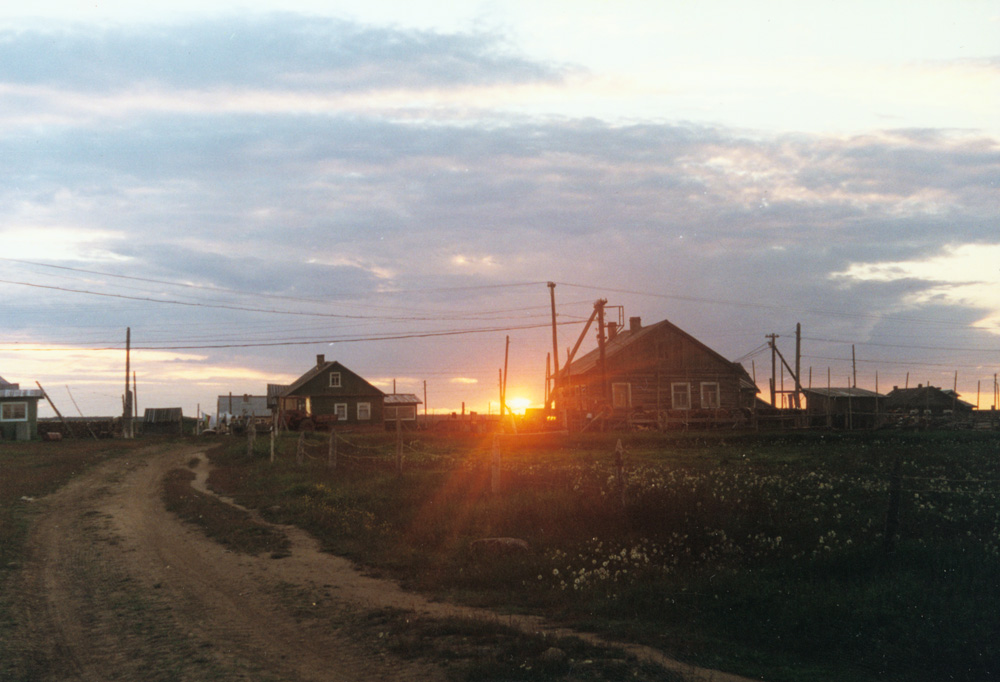
- Sosnovka in 1997
- Interactive map of Sosnovka
- Location of Sosnovka Sosnovka (Murmansk Oblast)
- Coordinates: 66°31′N 40°36′E
- Country: Russia
- Federal subject: Murmansk Oblast
- Administrative district: Lovozersky District

Population (2010 Census)
  - Total: 45
  - Estimate (2021): 26 (−42.2%)

Municipal status
  - Municipal district: Lovozersky Municipal District
  - Rural settlement: Lovozero Rural Settlement
- Time zone: UTC+3 (MSK)
- Postal code: 184575
- Dialing code: +7 81538
- OKTMO ID: 47610401116

Sosnovka (Russian: Сосновка; Ter Sami: Сосныэффке-сиййт) is a rural locality (a selo) in Lovozersky District of Murmansk Oblast, Russia, located on the Kola Peninsula at a height of 1 meter (3 ft 3 in) above sea level. It is located on the Tersky Coast at the mouth of the eponymous river Sosnovka, which discharges into the White Sea Throat. As of the 2010 census, Sosnovka had a population of 45.

The Sámi (Lopar) pogost of Sosnovka was formed in the beginning of the 19th century from parts of the Kamensky and Lumbovsky pogosts. According to another explanation, Sosnovka is a continuation of an earlier Purnach pogost mentioned in 1610. The language spoken by the Sámi people of Sosnovka was Ter Sámi. In 1855, the village was destroyed by British forces during the Crimean War.

On March 1, 1920, the Ponoysky, Iokangsky and Kamensky selsoviets were established on the territory of the Ponoy volost, with Sosnovka being the administrative center of the Kamensky selsoviet. Due to its size, it was divided into the Kamensky, Sosnovsky and Lumbovsky selsoviets on April 19, 1921. In 1927, the Sosnovsky selsoviet became part of the Ponoysky District, which was renamed the Saamsky District in 1936. The official name of the settlement was Sosnovsky pogost (Сосновский погост) until the 1930s, when Sosnovka became the official form.

The main livelihoods in Sosnovka were fishing, especially of salmon, and reindeer herding, and a fishing and reindeer herding kolkhoz was established there in 1930. In 1926, Sosnovka had a population of 68, most of whom were Sámi, but by 1938, the population had increased to 118, now mainly Russians and Komi people.

After the Saamsky District was abolished on January 26, 1963, Sosnovka became part of the Lovozersky District. In the same year, part of the population of Yokanga was relocated to Sosnovka.
