= Kanevka =

Kanevka Каневка
- Selo
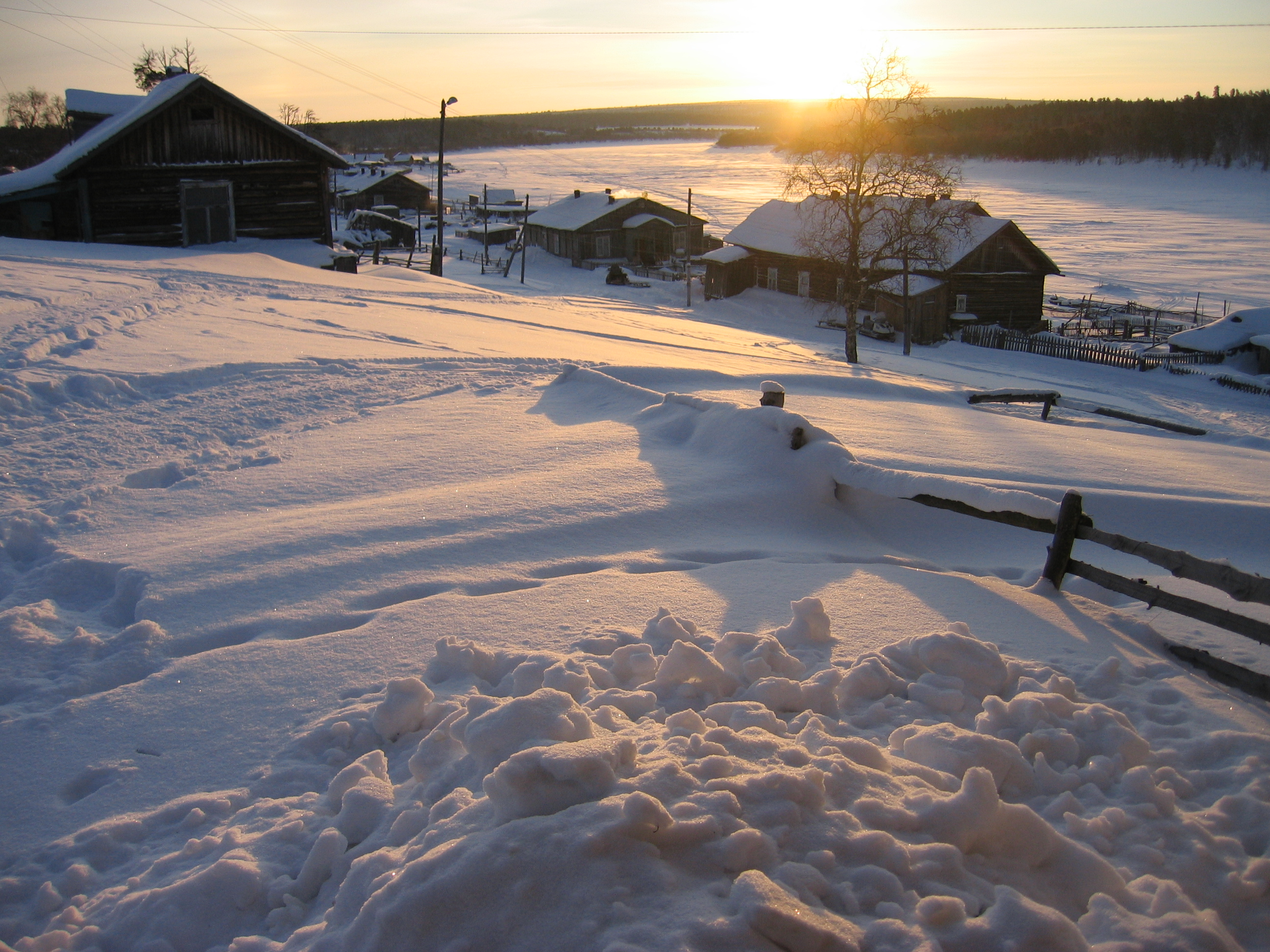
- Interactive map of Kanevka
- Location of Kanevka Kanevka (Murmansk Oblast)
- Coordinates: 67°08′N 39°40′E
- Country: Russia
- Federal subject: Murmansk Oblast
- Administrative district: Lovozersky District
- Elevation: 136 m (446 ft)

Population (2010 Census)
  - Total: 67
  - Estimate (2021): 51 (−23.9%)

Municipal status
  - Municipal district: Lovozersky Municipal District
  - Rural settlement: Lovozero Rural Settlement
- Time zone: UTC+3 (MSK)
- Postal code: 184570
- Dialing code: +7 81538
- OKTMO ID: 47610401106

Kanevka (Russian: Каневка) is a rural locality (a selo) in Lovozersky District of Murmansk Oblast, Russia, located beyond the Arctic Circle on the Kola Peninsula at a height of 136 meters (446 ft) above sea level. As of the 2010 census, Kanevka had a population of 67. It is located at the confluence of the Ponoy and the Yugonka, 255 kilometers (158 mi) away from Lovozero.

Kanevka was established by Komi people from the Pechora basin in 1923 and was named after its founder's surname, Kanev. There were three other Komi villages nearby established around the same time: Ivanovka (Chalmny-Varre), Krasnoshchelye and Oksino. In 1927, Kanevka became the winter settlement of the Sámi community (siida) of Lumbovka, replacing their previous winter settlement by the river Acheryok. However, the Sámi settled permanently in the summer settlement of Lumbovka in 1934. The population of Kanevka was 166 in 1938, most of whom were Komi. It became the center of a selsoviet in 1967.

In the 2002 census, Kanevka had a population of 107, including ethnic Komi, Russians, Ukrainians and Moldovans. Since 29 December 2004, it has been part of the Lovozero Rural Settlement (municipality).
