= Ter Sámi =

Nearly extinct Uralic language

- sām’e kīll (са̄мя кӣлл), tar’je kīll (тарье кӣлл)
- Native to: Russia
- Region: Murmansk Oblast, St. Petersburg
- Ethnicity: Kola Sámi
- Native speakers: 2 (2011); 30 (2007)
- Language family: Uralic: Sámi; Eastern Sámi; Ter Sámi
- Writing system: Latin script (historical), Cyrillic script (current; unofficial)

Language codes
- ISO 639-3: sjt
- Glottolog: ters1235
- ELP: Ter Saami
- Ter Sami language area (red) within Sápmi (grey)

- Ter Sámi is classified as Critically Endangered by the UNESCO Atlas of the World's Languages in Danger (2010)

Ter Sámi is the easternmost of the Sámi languages. It was traditionally spoken in the northeastern part of the Kola Peninsula, but now it is a moribund language; in 2004, only ten speakers were left. By 2011, the number of speakers had decreased to two. Other estimates counted about 30 Ter Sámi speakers in Murmansk Oblast, as well as in St. Petersburg, in 2007. The mean age of the youngest Ter Sámi speakers at that time was 50.

Sámi dialects and settlements in Russia: Ter

== History ==
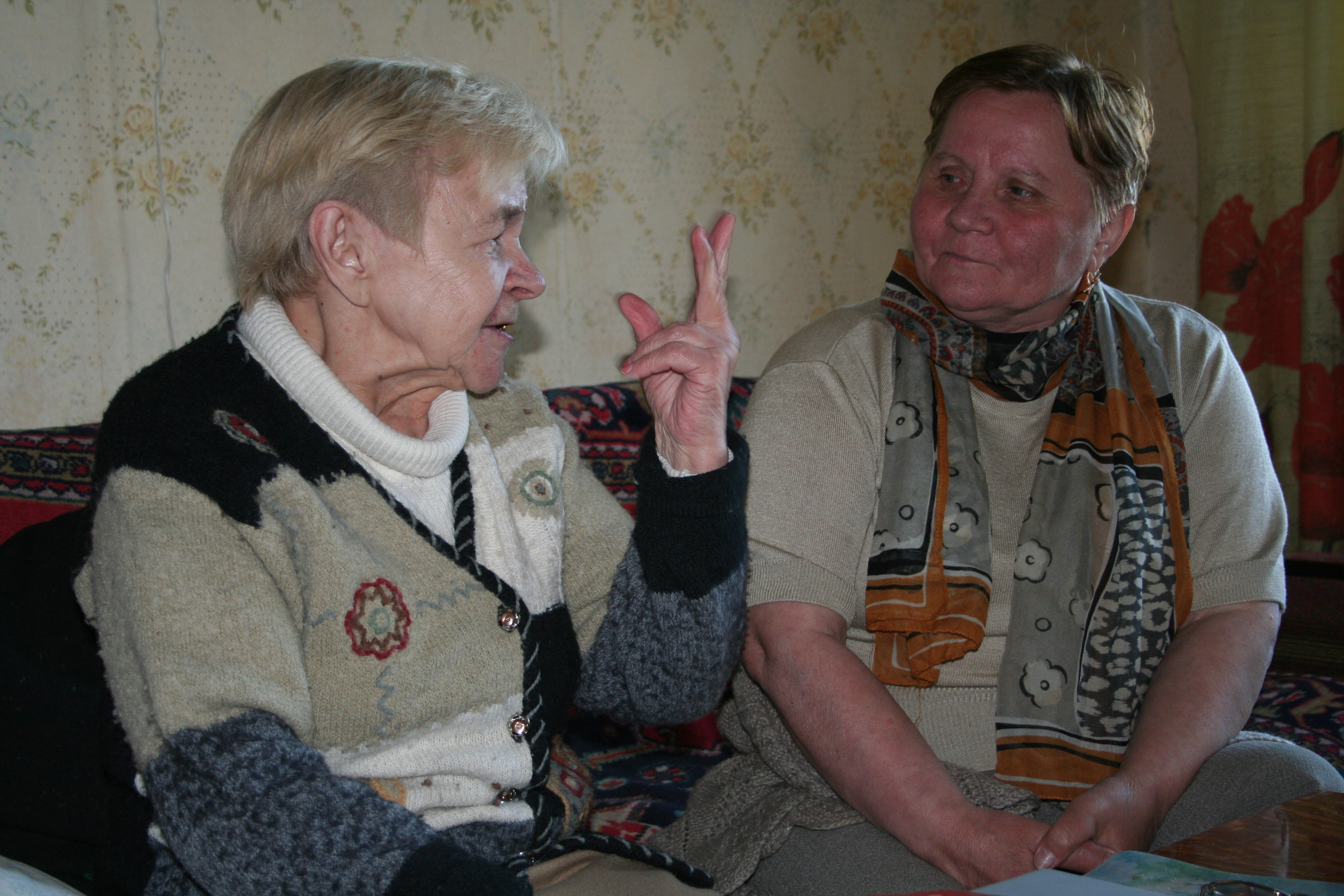
Zoya Gerasimova (left), one of the last speakers of Ter Sámi, speaking with Nina Afanasyeva (2006)

In the end of the 19th century, there were six Ter Sámi villages in the eastern part of the Kola Peninsula, Yokanga, Lumbovka, Ponoy, Sosnovka, Kuroptevsky, and Kamensky with a total population of approximately 450. In 2004, there were approximately 100 ethnic Ter Sámi of whom two elderly persons speak the language; the rest have shifted their language to Russian.

The rapid decline in the number of speakers was caused by Soviet collectivisation, in the 1930s, and the largest Ter Sámi village, Yokanga, was declared "perspectiveless" and its inhabitants were forced to move to the Gremikha military base.

== Documentation ==
There are no educational materials or facilities in Ter Sámi, and the language has no standardized orthography. The language is incompletely studied and documented, though text specimens and audio recordings as well as dictionaries for linguistic purposes exist.

== Phonology ==
=== Consonants ===
	Labial	Alveolar	Post- alveolar	Palatal	Velar	Glottal
Plosive	p b	t d			k ɡ	
Affricate		t͡s d͡z	t͡ʃ d͡ʒ			
Fricative	f v	s z	ʃ ʒ		x	h
Nasal	m	n̥ n			ŋ	
Approximant (Lateral)				j		
Approximant (Lateral)		l̥ l				
Trill		r̥ r				

- All consonants except for /j/ may be palatalized [ʲ].
- Consonants /t, d/ can also sound as half-palatalized.

=== Vowels ===
	Front		Central		Back	
	short	long	short	long	short	long
Close	i	iː	ɨ	ɨː	u	uː
Mid	ɛ				o	
Open			a	aː	ɔ	

- After palatalized consonants, /ɛ/ is realized as [e].

== Writing system ==
A spelling system for Sámi languages using the Latin alphabet and based on Skolt Sámi was developed in the 1930s. Oktyabrina Voronova published the only poetry booklet in Ter Sámi in 1989 using an orthography based on the Cyrillic Kildin Sámi orthography of 1982.

Unofficial Ter Sámi alphabet
А а	Ӓ ӓ	Б б	В в	Г г	Д д	Е е	Ё ё	Ж ж
З з	И и	Й й	К к	Л л	Ӆ ӆ	М м	Ӎ ӎ	Н н
Ӊ ӊ	Ӈ ӈ	О о	П п	Р р	Ҏ ҏ	С с	Т т	У у
Ф ф	Х х	Ц ц	Ч ч	Ш ш	Ъ ъ	Ы ы	Ӹ ӹ	Ь ь
Ҍ ҍ	Э э	Ӭ ӭ	Ю ю	Я я

== Morphology ==
Ter Sámi has 8 cases, Nominative, Genitive, Accusative, Essive, Inessive-Lative, Dative-Illative, Abessive, and Comitative.

case	singular	plural
NOM	-	change of the main part of word
GEN	change of the main part of word	change of the main part of word
ACC	change of the main part of word	t
ESS	n	n
INE	s't	n
DAT	a, i	t
ABE	ta	ta
COM	n	k'em, g'em

=== Examples of the genitive ===
(in the UPA)

abre' paл = raining cloud

pɛci̮ pal'čemi̮š = slaughter of deer

taja oлmi̮j = German inhabitant

tara parnɛ = Russian boys

=== Plurals ===
In the nominative case, the base word changes when a plural is made.

Word	Meaning	Plural	Meaning
mi̮rr	forest	mi̮r	forests
k'iлл	language	k'iл	languages
šiɛn'n'	swamp	šiɛn'	swamps
tast	star	taast	stars

The word ku 'who' in the cases.

Case	Singular	Plural
Nominative	ku	kogg
Genitive	konn	kojt
Accusative	konn	kojt
Essive	kon'n'in	kojn
Inessive	kon'n'es't	kojn
Dative	kon'n'i	kojt
Abessive	konta	kojta
Comitative	kon'in	kojgujm

== Vocabulary ==
Sample vocabulary in Ter Sámi
Ter Sámi	Latin transcription	English gloss
выэййвэ	vɨejjve	head
ныкчым	nɨkčɨm	tongue
кидт	kidt	hand
лоннҍт	lonn't	bird
чадце	čadc'e	water
ке̄ддҍкэ	kiedd'ke	stone
аббьрэ	abb're	rain
толл	toll	fire
