= Chalmny-Varre =

Chalmny-Varre Чальмны-Варрэ
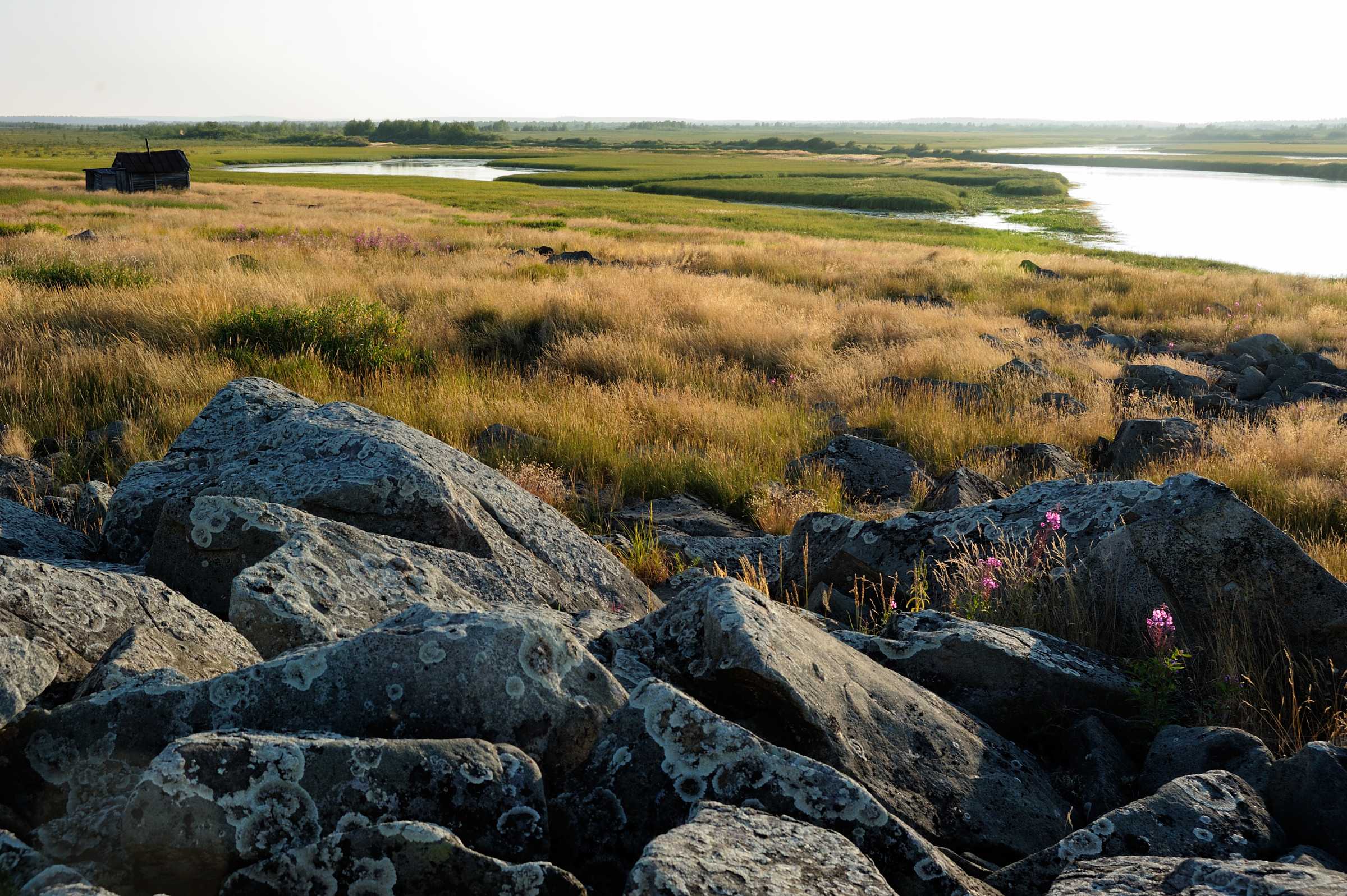
- Interactive map of Chalmny-Varre
- Location of Chalmny-Varre Chalmny-Varre (Murmansk Oblast)
- Coordinates: 67.170°N 37.584°E
- Country: Russia
- Federal subject: Murmansk Oblast
- Administrative district: Lovozersky District
- Founded: 1917

Chalmny-Varre (Russian: Чальмны-Варрэ), (Note: Alternative forms include Chalmny-Varry (Чальмны‑Варры), Chalmne-Vary (Чальмне‑Вары), Chalpy-Vary (Чалпы‑Вары), Chalmna-Varay (Чальмна‑Варай) and Chalmevarr (Чальмэварр).) until 1932 Ivanovka (Russian: Ивановка), was a village in the Murmansk Oblast of Russia, located on the Kola Peninsula by the river Ponoy. It was established in 1917 and abolished in 1971.

== History ==
The village of Ivanovka was established by Komi people from the Pechora basin in 1917 and was after its founder, Ivan Rochev. It was one of four Komi villages in the area along with Krasnoshchelye, Oksino and Kanevka established in the early 1920s. The closest settlement to Ivanovka at the time was Kamenka (Kamensky pogost), inhabited by Sámi people. In March 1922, Ivanovka became the center of a selsoviet, which was abolished already in the latter half of the year after the establishment of the Lovozero selsoviet. However, the Ivanovka selsoviet was restored on 31 January 1924. In 1927, it became part of the newly established Lovozersky District.

Ivanovka was renamed Chalmny-Varre on 9 April 1932. The name was taken from a nearby hill, whose name is of Sámi origin and translates to "eyes of the hill". The population of Kamenka was relocated to the village between 1931 and 1934. By 1938, there were 216 people living in Chalmny-Varre, including both Sámi and Komi people. On 1 January 1961, the Chalmny-Varre selsoviet was abolished and the village became part of the Krasnoshchelye selsoviet. Chalmny-Varre itself was abolished on 31 August 1971, with its population being relocated to Krasnoshchelye and Lovozero.

== Ponoy petroglyphs ==
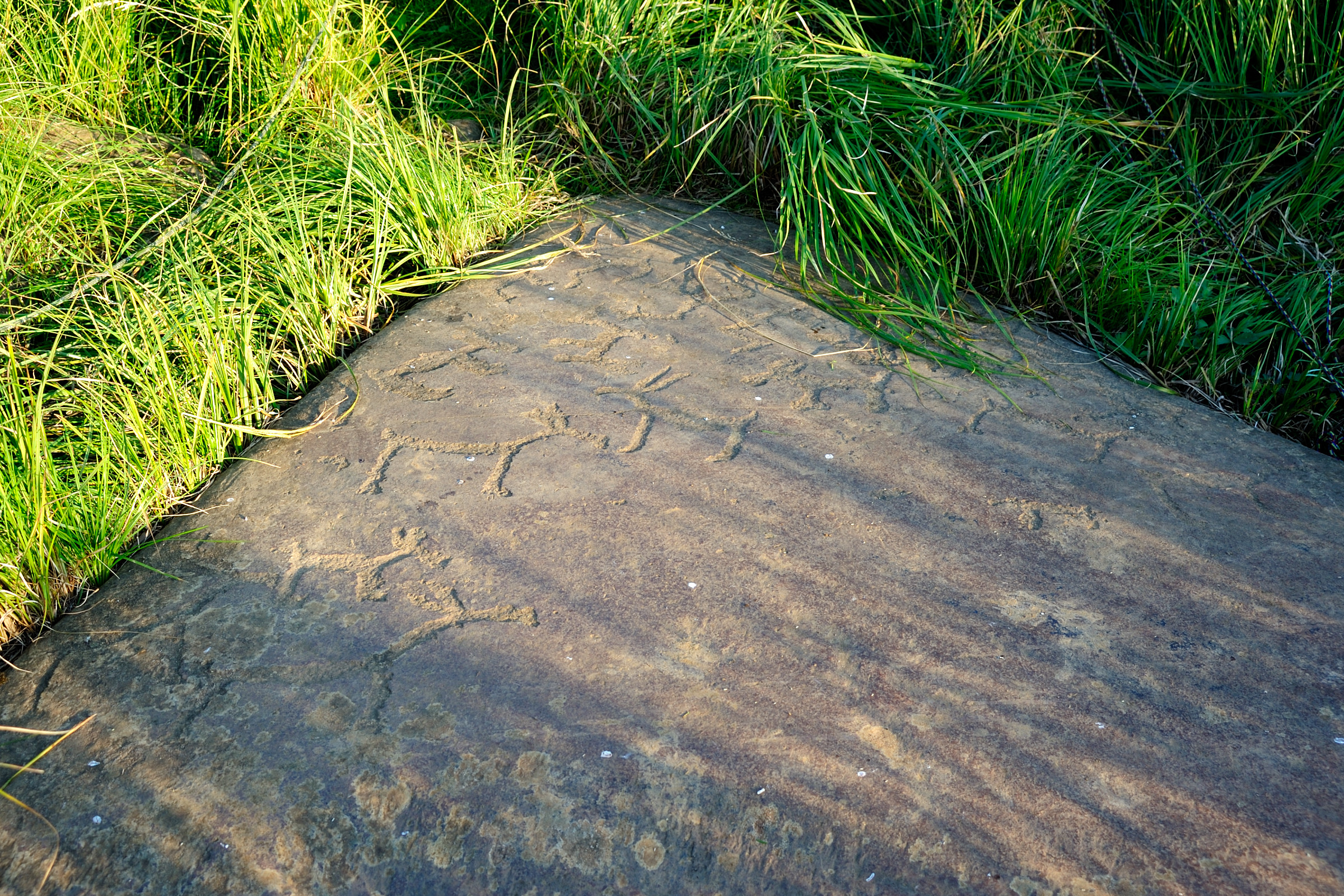
Rock carvings near Chalmny-Varre

In 1973, a group of rock carvings was discovered near Chalmny-Varre, comprising over a hundred figures carved into ten boulders. The carvings appear to have been made in two distinct periods.

== Notable people ==
- Iraida Vinogradova (1936–2004), Sámi poet and singer
- Oktyabrina Voronova (1934–1990), Sámi poet
