= Lovozero =

Lovozero may refer to:

- Lovozero Massif, a mountain range in the center of Kola Peninsula, Russia
- Lake Lovozero, a lake in Murmansk Oblast, Russia
- Lovozero (rural locality), a rural locality (a selo) in Murmansk Oblast, Russia
- Lovozero (air base), a military air base in Murmansk, Russia
