= Scandinavian literature =

Literature in the languages of the Nordic countries of Northern Europe

Scandinavian literature, also referred to as Nordic literature, comprises literature written in the languages of the Nordic countries of Northern Europe. The Nordic countries include Denmark, Finland, Iceland, Norway (including Svalbard), and Sweden, as well as the associated autonomous territories of Åland, the Faroe Islands, and Greenland. The majority of these nations and regions use North Germanic languages, in addition to Finnish, Saami languages and Greenlandic. Although the majority of Finns speak a Uralic language, Finnish history and literature are clearly interrelated with those of both Sweden and Norway who have shared control of various areas and who have substantial Sami populations/influences.

These peoples have produced an important and influential literature. Henrik Ibsen, a Norwegian playwright, was largely responsible for the popularity of modern realistic drama in Europe, with plays like The Wild Duck and A Doll's House. Nobel Prizes in Literature, itself a Scandinavian award, have been awarded to Selma Lagerlöf, Verner von Heidenstam, Karl Adolph Gjellerup, Henrik Pontoppidan, Knut Hamsun, Sigrid Undset, Erik Axel Karlfeldt, Frans Eemil Sillanpää, Johannes Vilhelm Jensen, Pär Lagerkvist, Halldór Laxness, Nelly Sachs, Eyvind Johnson, Harry Martinson, Tomas Tranströmer, and Jon Fosse.

== Medieval Scandinavian literature ==
In medieval times Scandinavia shared first Proto-Norse and then Old Norse as a common language. The earliest written records from Scandinavia are runic inscriptions on memorial stones and other objects. Some of those contain allusions to Norse mythology and even short poems in alliterative verse. The best known example is the elaborate Rök runestone (ca. 800) which alludes to legends from the migration age. The oldest of the Eddic poems are believed to have been composed in the 9th century, though they are only preserved in 13th-century manuscripts. They tell of the myths and heroic legends of Scandinavia. Skaldic poetry is mostly preserved in late manuscripts but was preserved orally from the 9th century onwards, and also appears on runestones, such as the Karlevi Runestone.

The advent of Christianity in the 10th century brought Scandinavia into contact with European learning, including the Latin alphabet and the Latin language. In the 12th century this was to bear literary fruit in works such as the Danish Gesta Danorum, an ambitious historical work by Saxo Grammaticus. The 13th century was a golden age of Icelandic literature with Snorri Sturluson's Prose Edda and Heimskringla.

== Danish literature ==
The 16th century brought the Lutheran Reformation to Denmark and a new period in the nation's literature. Major authors of the time include the humanist Christiern Pedersen, who translated the New Testament into Danish, and Poul Helgesen who vigorously opposed the Reformation. The 16th century also saw Denmark's earliest plays, including the works of Hieronymus Justesen Ranch. The 17th century was an era of renewed interest in Scandinavian antiquities with scholars like Ole Worm at the forefront. Though religious dogmatism was on the rise the passionate hymns of Thomas Kingo transcended the genre with personal expression. External struggles with Sweden and internal rivalries among the nobility leading to Denmark's absolute monarchy in 1660 are chronicled from a royal prisoner's redemptive perspective in the heartfelt prose of Leonora Christina of the Blue Tower. Later Danish authors include Hans Christian Andersen, Søren Kierkegaard, Johannes V. Jensen, and Karen Blixen.

== Faroese literature ==
Faroese literature in the traditional sense of the word has only really developed in the past 100–200 years. This is mainly because of the island's isolation, and also because the Faroese language was not written down in a standardised format until 1890. In the Middle Ages many Faroese poems and stories were handed down orally. These works were split into the following divisions: sagnir (historical), ævintyr (stories) and kvæði (ballads, often set to music and dance). These were eventually written down in the 19th century, providing the basis for a late but powerful literature.

== Finland-Swedish literature ==
Though nationally rooted in Finland and linguistically part of the Swedish language sphere, Finland-Swedish literature evolved as a culturally and institutionally distinct branch of Swedish literature. It developed its own literary movements, and its production and reception take place under different conditions in bilingual Finland than in Sweden. Prominent representatives include Johan Ludvig Runeberg, Edith Södergran, Tove Jansson and Tua Forsström.

== Finnish literature ==
The history of Finland has been tumultuous. During much of recorded history the language of the government was different from that of the majority of the population. This had a strong influence on Finnish literature, with many of the greatest works revolving around achieving or maintaining a strong Finnish identity.

The most famous collection of folk poetry is by far the Kalevala. Referred to as the Finnish national epic, it is mainly credited to Elias Lönnrot although he worked more as an editor and compiler. It was first published in 1835 and quickly became a symbol of Finnish nationalism. The first novel published in Finnish was Seven Brothers (1870) by Aleksis Kivi (1834–1872), still generally considered to be one of the greatest of all works of Finnish literature.

== Greenlandic literature ==
Prior to the development of a written tradition, Inuit culture in Greenland was characterised by a rich body of legends and myths preserved through oral tradition. These narratives were collected in the 19th century, most notably by Hinrich Johannes Rink in western Greenland, and in the early 20th century by Knud Rasmussen in northern Greenland. In the 19th century, Greenlandic literature was strongly influenced by Christian hymnody, with figures such as Rasmus Berthelsen, Henrik Lund, and Jonathan Petersen playing a central role.

Modern Greenlandic literature began with the publication of the first novel, Singnagtugaĸ (“A Dream”), by Mathias Storch in 1914. Like Ukiut 300-nngornerat (“Three Hundred Years Later”, 1931) by Augo Lynge, it presents a utopian vision of a future, free Greenland. Throughout the 20th century, Greenlandic literature increasingly addressed themes of colonisation, cultural identity, and political autonomy, particularly from the 1970s onward, when a strongly politicised postcolonial literary movement emerged. Prominent late 20th-century figures include Hans Anthon Lynge and Ole Korneliussen.

Since the late 20th century, Greenlandic women writers have gained increasing prominence, beginning with Maaliaaraq Vebæk and Mariane Petersen. In the 21st century, a new generation of authors has emerged that engages with contemporary questions of Greenlandic identity and society, most notably Niviaq Korneliussen.

== Icelandic literature ==
The Icelanders' sagas (Icelandic: Íslendingasögur)—many of which are also known as family sagas—are prose histories describing mostly events that took place in Iceland in the 10th and early 11th centuries. They are the best known of specifically Icelandic literature from the early period. In late medieval times rímur became the most popular form of poetic expression. Influential Icelandic authors since the reformation include Hallgrímur Pétursson, Jónas Hallgrímsson, Gunnar Gunnarsson and Halldór Laxness.

== Norwegian literature ==
The period from the 14th century up to the 19th is considered a dark age in Norway's literature though Norwegian-born writers such as Peder Claussøn Friis and Ludvig Holberg contributed to the common literature of Denmark–Norway. With the advent of nationalism and the struggle for independence in the early 19th century a new period of national literature emerged. The dramatist Henrik Wergeland was the most influential author of the period while the later works of Henrik Ibsen were to earn Norway an influential place in Western European literature. In the 20th century notable Norwegian writers include the three Nobel Prize-winning authors Knut Hamsun, Bjørnstjerne Bjørnson and Sigrid Undset.

== Sámi literature ==
Sámi literature has a long oral tradition but a comparatively short written history. Traditional Sámi verbal art includes legends, folktales, joik (vocal music), proverbs, and riddles, transmitted through oral tradition. Unlike many other Indigenous literatures, Sámi literature has largely been published in the Sámi languages themselves rather than primarily in the majority languages of the Nordic states.

Early written documentation includes two joiks recorded in Johannes Schefferus’s Lapponia (1673). More systematic collection of Sámi oral poetry took place in the 19th century, influenced by broader European interest in folk culture. A foundational work of early Sámi prose is Muitalus sámiid birra (“An Account of the Sámi”, 1910) by the Norwegian Sámi author and cultural pioneer Johan Turi, a detailed ethnographic description of nomadic reindeer herding life written in Northern Sámi.

The first Sámi novel, Beaivi-Álgu (“Dawn”), was published in 1912 by Anders Larsen. This was followed in 1914 by the poetry and short story collection Muohtačalmmit (“Snowflakes”) by Pedar Jalvi. Literary activity remained limited for several decades, as assimilation policies in Norway, Sweden, and Finland restricted the use of Sámi languages in public life.

A significant revival of Sámi literature began in the 1970s, closely linked to Sámi political and cultural movements. One of the most influential figures was Paulus Utsi, whose poetry expresses a critical and often pessimistic view of the future of the Sámi people. International recognition was achieved by Nils-Aslak Valkeapää, a multidisciplinary artist whose work combined poetry, music, visual art, and photography; he became the first Sámi author to receive the Nordic Council Literature Prize for The Sun, My Father in 1991.

Contemporary Sámi literature encompasses a wide range of genres and voices. Prominent writers include Hans Aslak Guttorm, Rauni Magga Lukkari, Kirste Paltto, Ailo Gaup, Annok Sarri Nordrå, and Aagot Vinterbo-Hohr.

== Swedish literature ==
Sweden ranks fifth in the list of countries with most Nobel Prize laureates in literature. Famous Swedish writers include Selma Lagerlöf, Astrid Lindgren, Gustaf Fröding, Carl Jonas Love Almqvist, Vilhelm Moberg, August Strindberg, and Tomas Tranströmer.

== Recognition ==
=== International prizes ===
==== Nobel Prize in Literature ====
The Nobel Prize in Literature has been awarded to a number of Scandinavians, including:

Denmark

- Johannes Vilhelm Jensen, 1944
- Karl Adolph Gjellerup, 1917
- Henrik Pontoppidan, 1917

Finland

- Frans Eemil Sillanpää, born in the Grand Duchy of Finland, a part of the Russian Empire in 1809–1917, 1939

Iceland

- Halldór Kiljan Laxness, 1955

Norway

- Sigrid Undset, 1928
- Knut Hamsun, 1920
- Bjørnstjerne Bjørnson, 1903
- Jon Fosse, 2023

Sweden

- Tomas Tranströmer, 2011
- Eyvind Johnson, 1974
- Harry Martinson, 1974
- Nelly Sachs, born in Germany, 1966
- Pär Lagerkvist, 1951
- Erik Axel Karlfeldt, 1931
- Carl Gustaf Verner von Heidenstam,1916
- Selma Lagerlöf, 1909

=== Regional prizes ===
==== The Nordic Council's Literature Prize ====
The Nordic Council's Literature Prize is awarded by a Nordic adjudication committee for literature (novel, a play, a collection of poetry, short stories or essays) written in one of the Nordic languages. The committee is appointed by the Nordic Council and consists of 10 members:

- Two from Denmark,
- Two from Finland (one Finnish and one Finland-Swedish)
- Two from Iceland,
- Two from Norway and
- Two from Sweden.

==== Saami Council Literature Prize ====
The Saami Council Literature Prize is an award for Sámi literature, awarded by the Saami Council since 1994.

=== National Prizes ===
==== Finland ====
- The Finlandia Literature Prize
- Runeberg Prize
- Thanks for the Book Award, a literary prize presented by the Organization of the Booksellers' Association of Finland
- Atorox Award for science fiction

==== Norway ====
- The Norwegian Critics Prize for Literature
- Halldis Moren Vesaas Prize
- NBU-prisen
- The Norwegian Academy Prize in memory of Thorleif Dahl
- The Norwegian Academy of Literature and Freedom of Expression

==== Sweden ====
- The Selma Lagerlöf literature prize
- The Svenska Dagbladet Literary Prize
- The August (Strindberg) Prize
- Sveriges Radio's listeners' prize for literature
- Samfundet De Nio Prize
- Dobloug Prize – a Swedish Academy literature prize for Swedish and Norwegian fiction

== See also ==
- Nordic noir, Scandinavian crime fiction
- Project Runeberg, a project that publishes freely available electronic versions of Nordic books.
