= Oktyabrina Voronova =

- Born: Oktyabrina Vladimirovna Matryokhina; 5 October 1934; Chalmny-Varre, Murmansk Okrug, USSR
- Died: 16 June 1990 (aged 55); Revda, Murmansk Oblast, USSR
- Education: A. I. Herzen Leningrad State Pedagogical Institute; Research Institute of National Schools
- Occupation: Poet
- Spouse: Vyacheslav Voronov
- Writing career
- Language: Russian, Ter Sámi

Oktyabrina Vladimirovna Voronova (née Matryokhina, Russian: Октябрина Владимировна Воронова, née Матрёхина, 5 October 1934 Chalmny-Varre, Murmansk Okrug, USSR – 16 June 1990, Revda, Murmansk Oblast, USSR) was the first Soviet poet of Sámi origin to write a poetry collection in a Sámi language in Russia. Voronova wrote in both Russian and Sámi. She was living in Revda at the time of her death.

== Early life and education ==
Matryokhina was born on 5 October 1934 in the village of Chalmny-Varre, Murmansk Okrug, USSR, the eldest of six children born into the reindeer-herding family of Klavdiya Grigoryevna Matryokhina (Russian: Клавдия Григорьевна Матрёхина) and Vladimir Mikhailovich Matryokhin (Russian: Владимир Михайлович Матрёхин). Her mother was from a Sámi family of hunters and her father was Russian, from a family of Orthodox priests from Lovozero. Her younger sister Iraida Vinogradova is famous as a poet in her own right. Her other younger sister is the linguist T. V. Matryokhina.

In 1958, Matryokhina graduated from the A. I. Herzen Leningrad State Pedagogical Institute. While still a student at the Pedagogical Institute, she went on linguistic expeditions to the Kola Peninsula, along with G. M. Kert and other fellow students.

After graduating, she taught Russian language and literature at a school in Lovozero while also being enrolled in graduate school at the Research Institute of National Schools (Russian: Научно-исследовательский институт национальных школ). She completed her classes by correspondence, graduating from the institute in 1980. Around this time, she married Vyacheslav Voronov, whom she had met in Leningrad. In 1985, the couple moved to Revda and Voronova started work as a librarian at the Central Library of Revda where she worked until 1990.

== Death ==
Voronova died on 16 June 1990 at the age of 55. She is buried in Lovozero.

== Honors ==
In 1995, the Voronova Museum of Sámi Literature and Writing was founded. In 2006, the Voronova Prize was created.

== Bibliography ==
- Снежница (translated into Russian by the poet Vladimir Smirnov). – Murmansk, 1986.
- Вольная птица (translated into Russian by the poet Vladimir Smirnov). – Murmansk, 1987.
- Чахкли (translated into Russian by the poets Stanislav Dorokhov and Vladimir Smirnov). – Murmansk, 1988.
- Я̄лла (in Sámi with translations in Russian). – Murmansk, 1989.

Posthumous works:

- Поле жизни. — Murmansk, 1995.
- Тайна Бабьего суда. — St. Petersburg, 1995.
- Хочу остаться на земле. — Murmansk, 1995.

Scientific contributions:

- «Образцы диалектных текстов (Саамский язык)» (together with K. G. Matryokhina and T. V. Matryokhina) // Прибалтийско-финское языкознание. Выпуск 5. Вопросы взаимодействия Прибалтийско-Финских языков с иностемными языками. К 80-летию со дня рождения Д. В. Бубриха. — Leningrad, 1971. pp. 158–166.
- Саамский язык: учебник и книга для чтения для 2-го класса (together with A. A. Antonova and E. N. Korkina). — Leningrad, 1990.
