= Scandinavian legend =

Scandinavian legend may refer to:

- Scandinavian folklore
- Scandinavian literature
