= Elvira Galkina =

Kildin Sami-Russian singer (born 1965)

- Born: Elvira Abramovna Galkina; December 4, 1965 Lovozero, Murmansk Okrug, USSR
- Occupation: Poet, singer, teacher, author
- Language: Kildin Sámi

Elvira Abramovna Galkina (Russian: Эльвира Абрамовна Галкина) also known as Elya Galkina (born December 4, 1965, Lovozero, Murmansk, Soviet Union) is a Russian Kildin Sámi poet, author, and musician.

== Early life and education ==
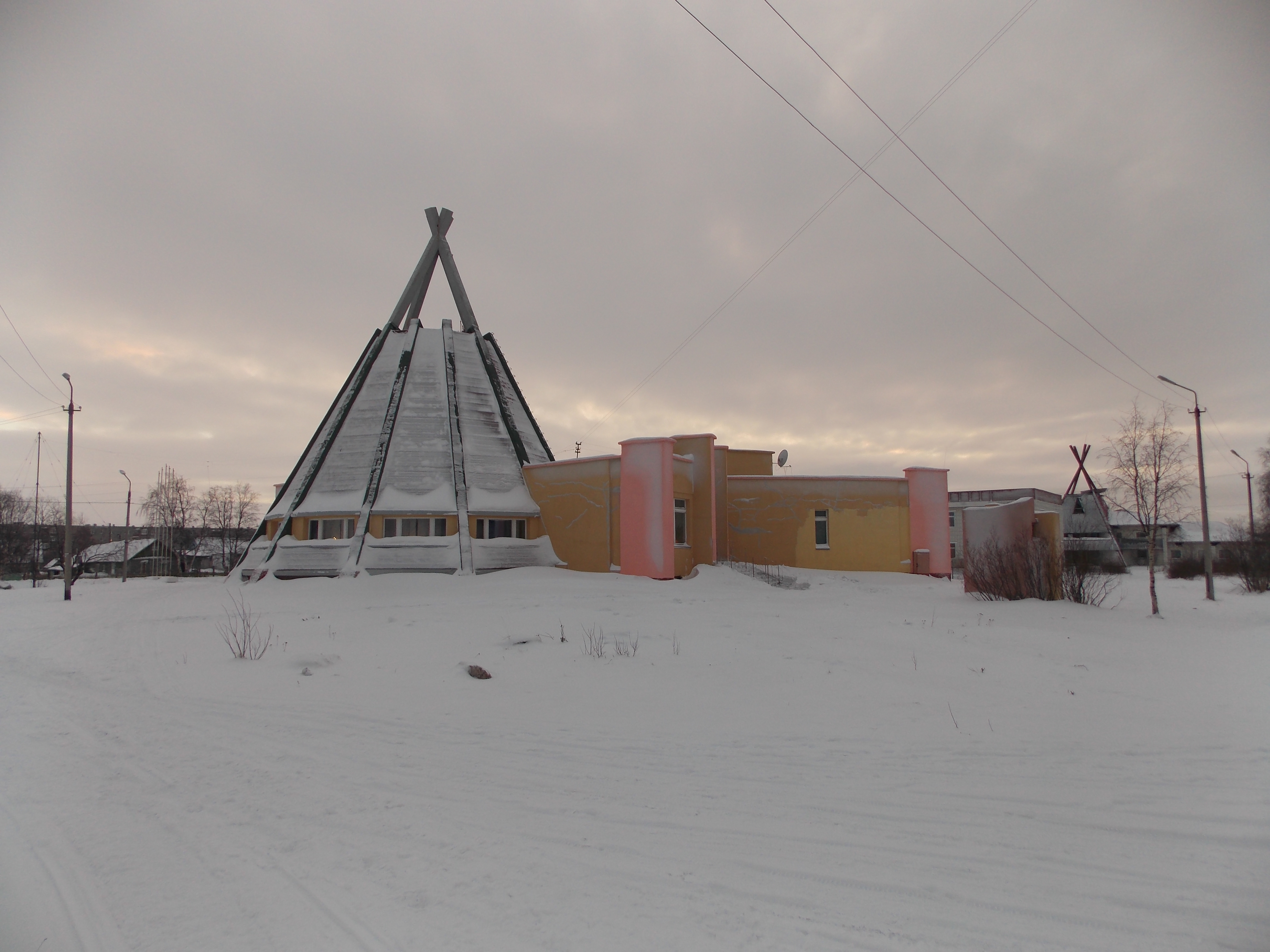
The Sámi National Cultural Center in Lovozero

Elvira Abramovna Vasiljeva was born on December 4, 1965, in the town of Lovozero, Murmansk, Soviet Union to a Kildin Sámi mother, Galina Gerasimovna Danilova, and a Russian father, Abram Vasilyevich Vasilyev. She spent her childhood with her maternal grandparents in the former village of Motka in Lovozero District until she went to school.

From 1973 to 1983 she studied at the school in Lovozero. From 1983 to 1987, she studied at the Institute of the Peoples of the North at the A. I. Herzen Leningrad State Pedagogical Institute. After graduating in 1987, she returned to Lovozero and worked as a teacher in a secondary school for a year, after which she switched to the Lovozero Cultural Center where she has been ever since.

== Career ==
Galkina wrote her first book of poetry Пе̄ййвьесь пе̄ййв in Kildin Sámi in 1991. It was reprinted in Russia again the following year, and a few years later Davvi Girji republished it in Kildin Sámi. The same year, Lasse Luoppal translated the poems from Kildin Sámi to Northern Sámi and Davvi Girji published a bilingual edition of the book. This edition of the book won Galkina the Saami Council Literature Prize.

Her next book Та̄ссьт нӣйта: Моайнас is also in Kildin Sámi. Davvi Girji published this book of fairy tales in 1998. They republished the book too as a bilingual book a year later once Leif Rantala had translated the story into Northern Sámi.

In the 2010s Galkina has written two novels: Пяйви: повесть (2010) and Сандра: Рассказы (2012). These have also been written in Kildin Sámi.

=== Music ===
In addition to writing books, Galkina has written the lyrics and composed the music for songs. She also has sung on stage. In 2001, Galkina debuted in the Sámi Grand Prix singing and yoiking contest with the song Kárášjohka. She placed third. She also participated in the contest the following year and this time she won the song category with the song Immel Agk.

== Awards ==
In 1994 Galkina and Iraida Vinogradova won the first ever Saami Council Literature Prize together but for separate Kildin Sámi books that were later translated into Northern Sámi and published as bilingual Kildin Sámi-Northern Sámi books. Galkina won the literature prize for the book Пе̄ййвьесь пе̄ййв – Šerres beaivi and Vinogradova for the book Мун ка̄нҍц – Mu ustibat.

== Discography ==
Galkina has songs on the following compilation albums that have been recorded during the Sámi Grand Prix competition:

- 2001 – Sami Grand Prix 2001, with the song Kárášjohka
- 2002 – Sami Grand Prix 2002, with the song Immel Agk

== Bibliography ==
- 1991 – Пе̄ййвьесь пе̄ййв: парна стиха. Murmansk
- 1992 – Пе̄ййвьесь пе̄ййв. Murmansk
- 1994 – Пе̄ййвьесь пе̄ййв. Davvi Girji
- 1994 – Пе̄ййвьесь пе̄ййв: Šerres beaivi, illustrated by Jakov Jakovlev and published by Davvi Girji
- 1998 – Та̄ссьт нӣйта: Моайнас. Davvi Girji
- 1999 – Та̄ссьт нӣйта: Моайнас – Nástenieida: Sámi máinnas, illustrated by Jakov Jakovlev and published by Davvi Girji
- 2010 – Пяйви: повесть. Murmansk
- 2012 – Сандра: Рассказы. Murmansk
