= Soviet submarine B-80 =

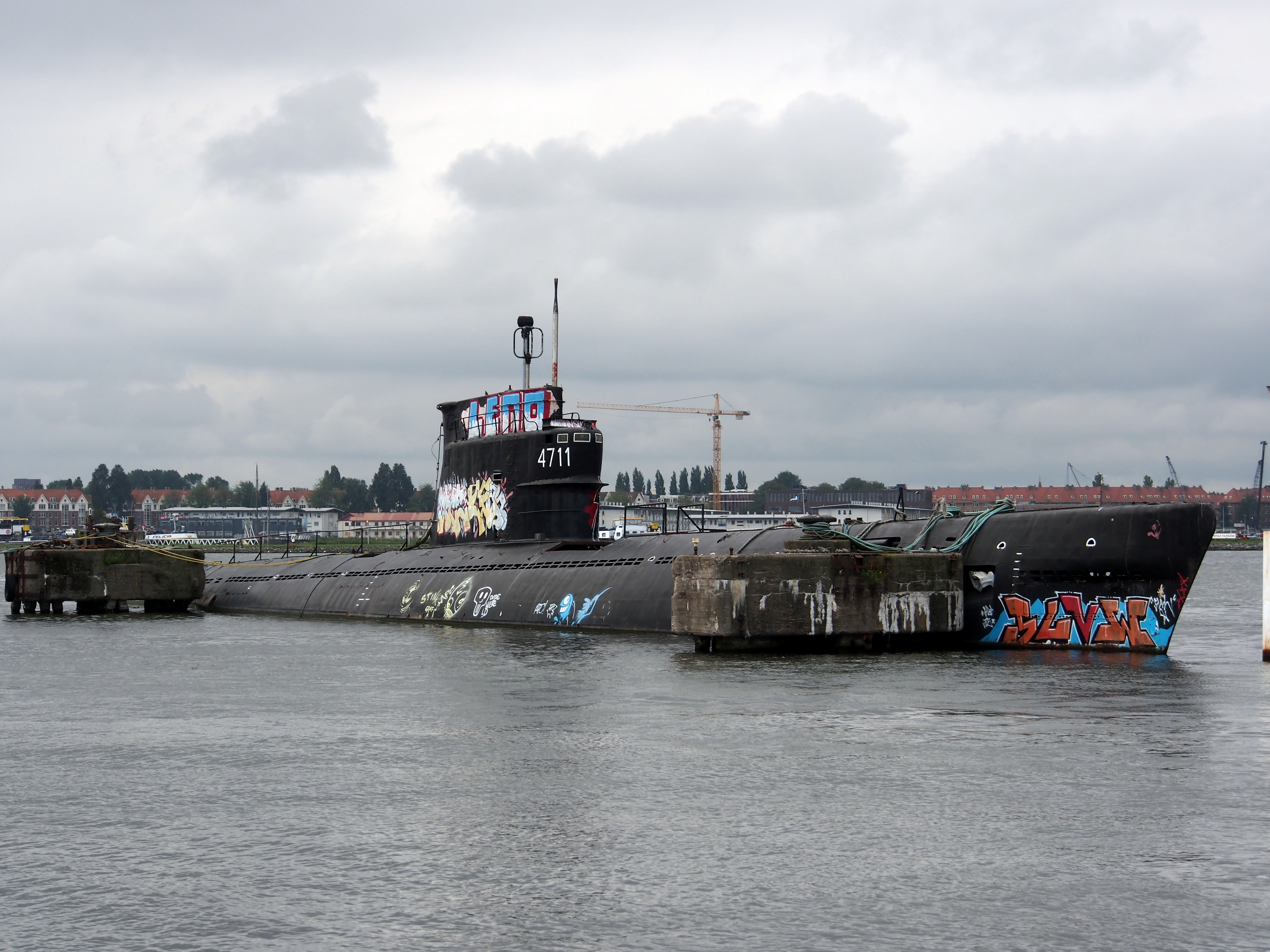
- B-80 seen at the NDSM yard in 2015

History

Soviet Union
- Name: B-80
- Builder: Sevmash/402 shipyard, Molotovsk
- Laid down: 1 February 1956
- Launched: 16 January 1957
- Completed: July 1957
- Home port: Yokanska
- Fate: Sold 1991, scrapped 2019

General characteristics
- Class & type: Zulu-class attack submarine
- Displacement: 1875 tons (1905 metric tonnes) (surfaced); 2387 tons (2425 metric tonnes) (submerged)
- Length: 90 m (295 ft)
- Beam: 7.5 m
- Draught: 5.14 m
- Propulsion: 3 diesel engines (6000 hp); 3 electric motors (5400 hp)
- Speed: Surfaced: 18 knots (33 km/h); Submerged: 16 knots (30 km/h)
- Test depth: 200 m (656 ft)
- Complement: 70 officers and men
- Armament: 6 bow and 4 stern 533-mm (21-inch) torpedo tubes; 22 torpedoes

Soviet submarine B-80 (Russian: Б-80) was a Project 611 or Zulu-class conventional submarine of the Soviet Navy's Northern Fleet. She was in service during the Cold War, and after de-commissioning was sold in 1991 to private buyers in the Netherlands. She was scrapped in 2019.

== Construction ==
B-80 was laid down on 1 February 1956 at the 402 shipyard in Molotovsk, on Russia's White Sea coast. One of 26 of a new generation of large ocean-going submarines for the Soviet navy. The project 611 boats were of double-hull construction, with a diesel-electric power train giving a surface speed of 18 knots, while streamlining allowed an underwater speed of 16 knots, an improvement on the performance of the submarines of the Second World War, and comparable to the US navy's submarines of the GUPPY programme. B-80 was armed with six bow and four stern torpedo tubes, and carried twenty-two 533mm (21 inch) torpedoes. She was also built with two 57mm cannon, and twin 25mm anti-aircraft guns, but these were later removed to improve underwater performance. She was launched on 16 January 1957 and completed in July of that year.

== Service history ==
B-80 entered service in July 1957 and was stationed at Polyarny naval base in the Kola Peninsula. In 1958 she undertook a war patrol with sister submarine B-75 to the South Atlantic, patrolling the coast of South America before returning to fleet duties in the Arctic Ocean.

In 1968 she made a patrol into the Mediterranean, and was stationed for a time at Alexandria, in Egypt.

In 1970 B-80 rejoined the Northern Fleet, stationed at Yokanska, making a number of patrols in the Northern Sea, but in 1988 was placed in reserve, and in 1990 was de-commissioned.

== Fate ==
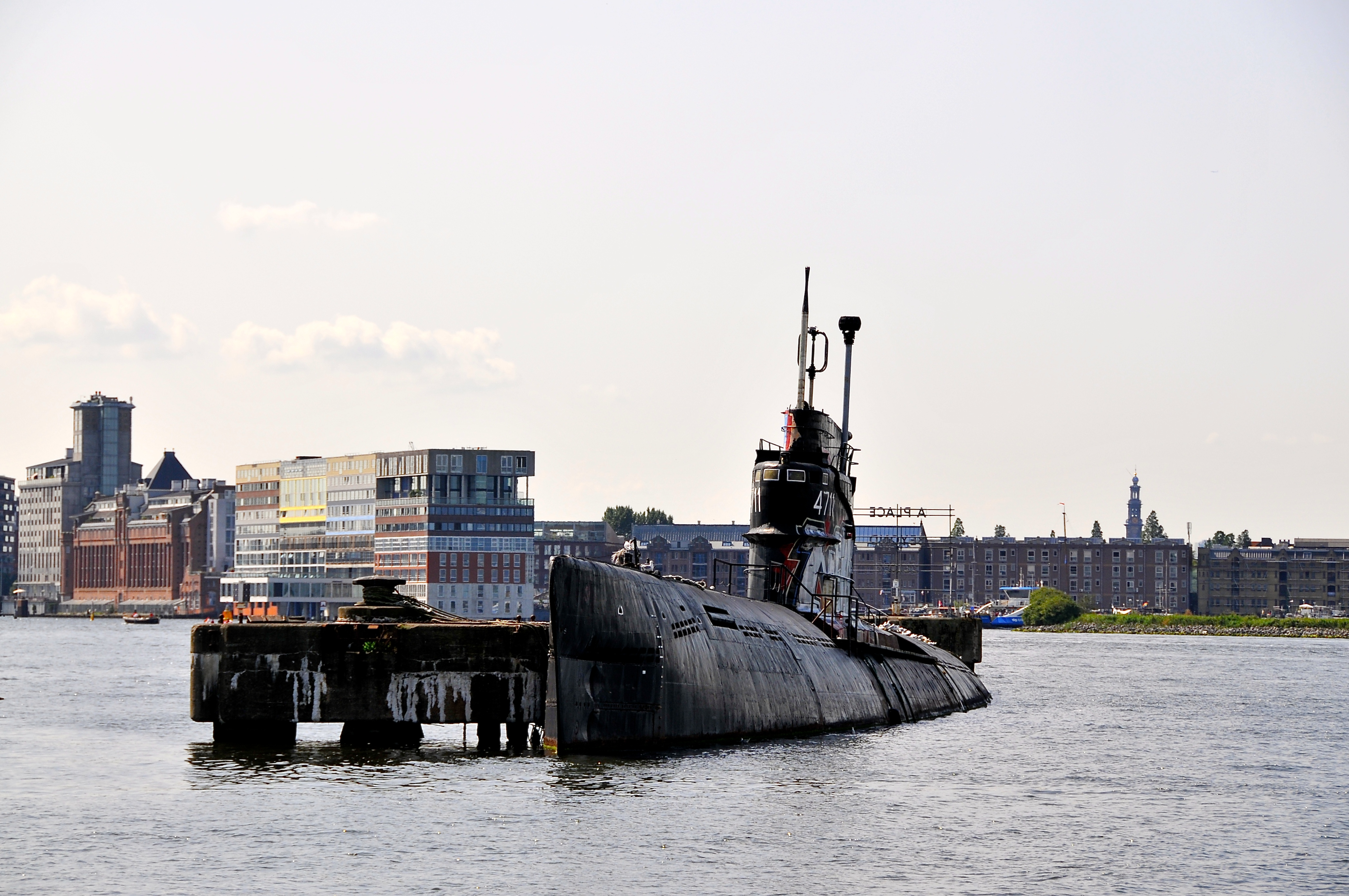
B-80 at Amsterdam awaiting conversion to private use, August 2014

The ship named B-80 was bought by two Dutch businessmen in 1991 and towed to the port of Den Helder. The new owners called the ship "Foxtrot", but later realized their purchase was a Zulu-class submarine, however the media still refer to the ship as "Foxtrot B-80". In 2002, when it was sold to Michael Nijdam, an architect from Amsterdam, it was towed to the NDSM yard in Amsterdam. It changed owners again several times but none of the short-lived owners realized their plans with the ship. In December 2019, after a long-running dispute between the city of Amsterdam and the alleged owners of the ship, and after being unable to definitely identify the legal owner of the ship, on orders of the city council the ship was towed to a scrapyard to be dismantled, which received a reasonable amount of media attention.
