= Revda =

Revda may refer to:

- Revda, Sverdlovsk Oblast, a town in Sverdlovsk Oblast, Russia
- Revda, Murmansk Oblast, an urban-type settlement in Murmansk Oblast, Russia
- Revda (river), a tributary of the Chusovaya in Sverdlovsk Oblast, Russia
