= Kakovikha Bay =

Bay in the White Sea, near Ostrovnoy, Russia

Coordinates: 67°53′42″N 40°18′56″E

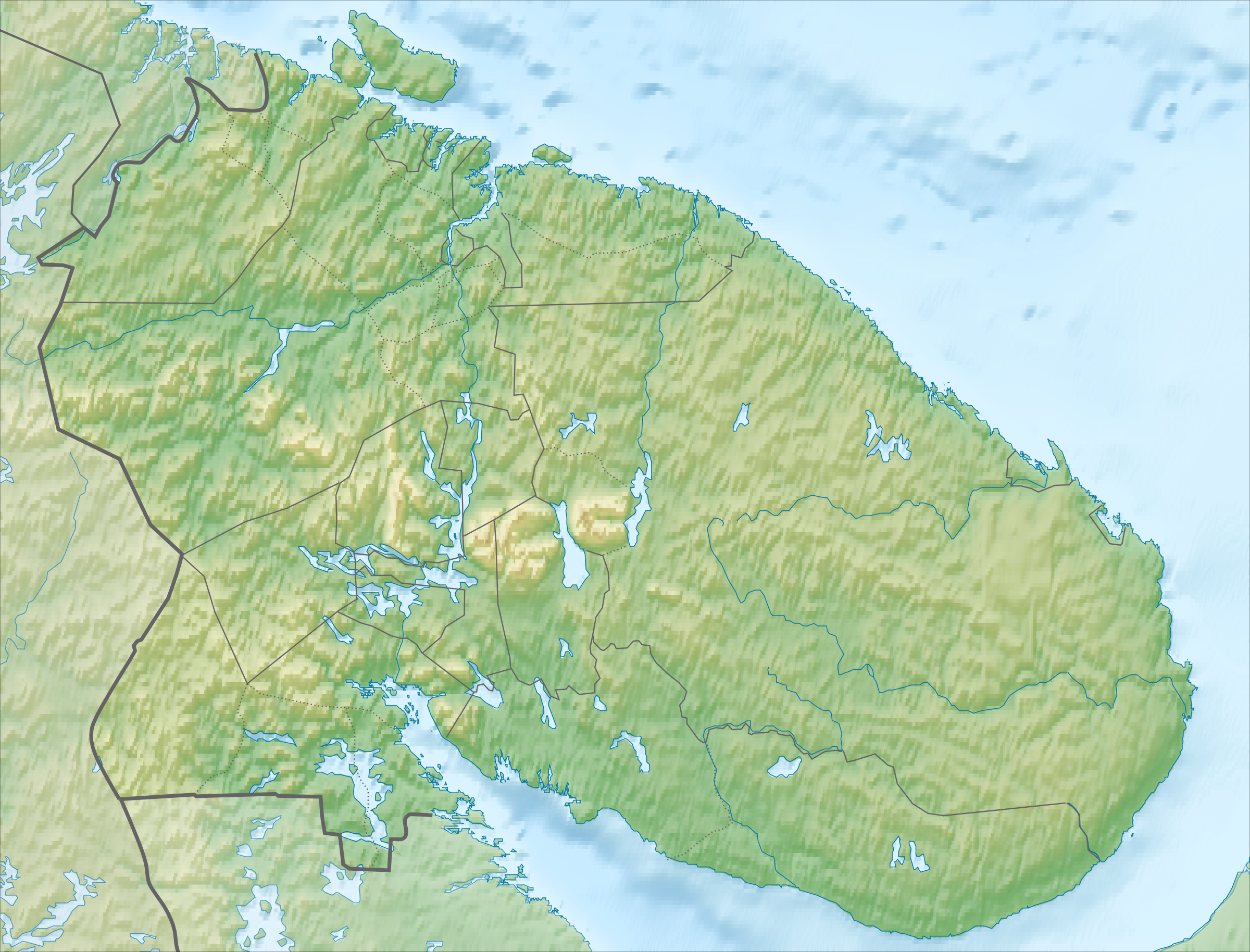
- Location within Murmansk Oblast
- Location: White Sea
- Ocean/sea sources: Arctic Ocean
- Basin countries: Russia

Kakovikha Bay (Russian: губа Каковиха) is a bay in the White Sea, near Ostrovnoy, Russia, off the Tersky Coast.
