= Krasnoshchelye =

Krasnoshchelye Краснощелье
- Selo
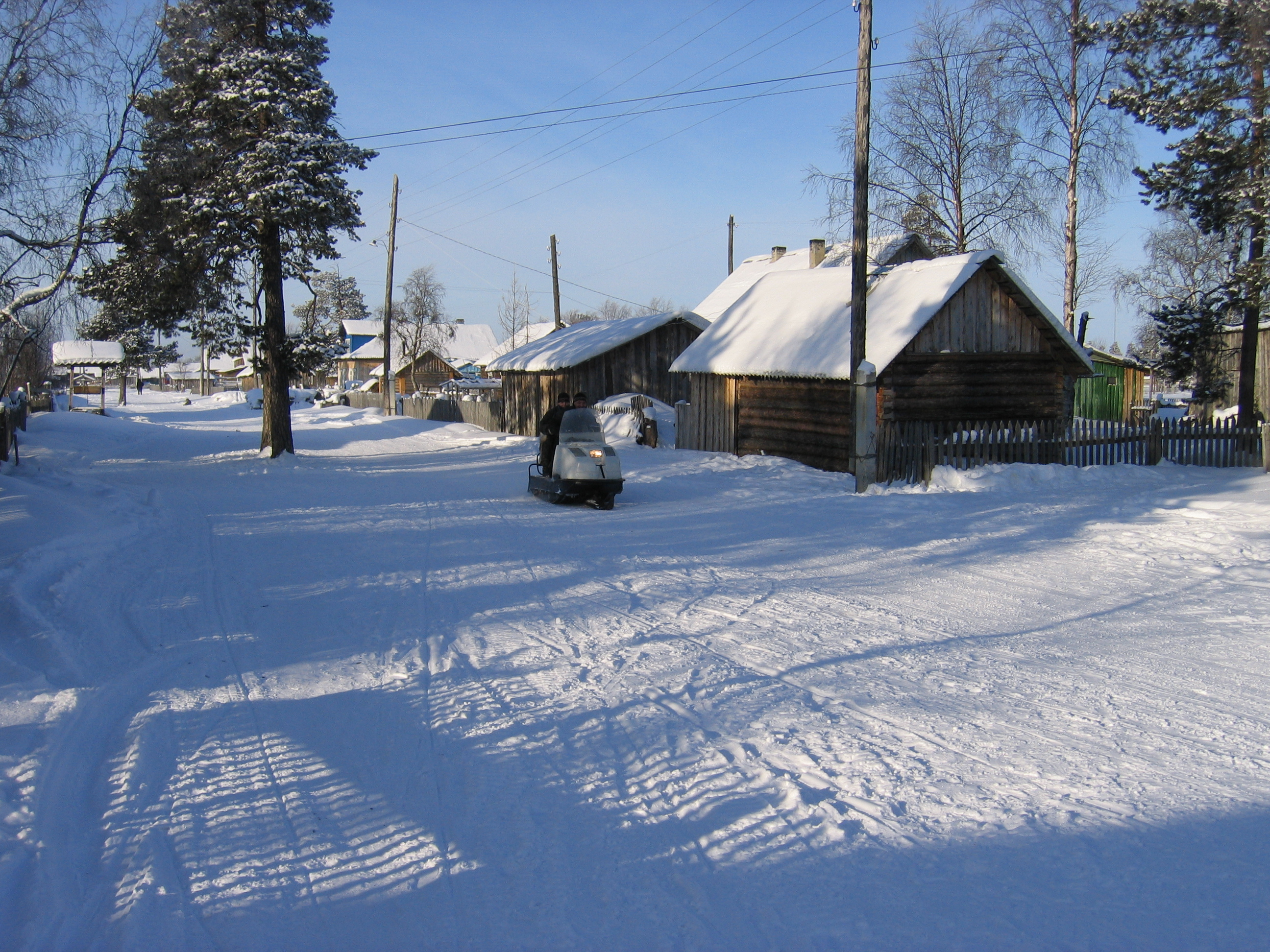
- Interactive map of Krasnoshchelye
- Location of Krasnoshchelye Krasnoshchelye (Murmansk Oblast)
- Coordinates: 67°20′0″N 37°1′59″E
- Country: Russia
- Federal subject: Murmansk Oblast
- Administrative district: Lovozersky District
- Founded: 1921
- Elevation: 157 m (515 ft)

Population (2010 Census)
  - Total: 423
  - Estimate (2021): 271 (−35.9%)
- Time zone: UTC+3 (MSK)
- Postal code: 184595
- Dialing code: +7 81538
- OKTMO ID: 47610401111

Krasnoshchelye (Russian: Краснощелье) (Note: Komi: Гöрд щелья; Kildin Sami: Кра̄снэ сыййт) is a rural locality (a Selo) in Lovozersky District of Murmansk Oblast, Russia. The village is located beyond the Arctic Circle, on the Kola Peninsula. It is 157 m above sea level.

Krasnoshchelye was established in the 1920s by Izhma Komi people, who make up most of its population today. Sámi people also live in the settlement.

The film "The Tundra Race" by German director René Harder portrays the village and its inhabitants. The documentation was launched at the Locarno International Film Festival in 2013.

== History ==
Krasnoshchelye was established by Komi people from the Pechora basin around 1920. Three other Komi villages existed nearby: Ivanovka (Chalmny-Varre) founded in 1917, Oksino founded in 1920 and Kanevka founded in 1923. According to the census of 1926–1927, Krasnoshchelye had 14 households and 78 inhabitants, of whom 62 were Komi and 16 were Nenets. The villagers were engaged in reindeer herding and fishing.

A reindeer herding kolkhoz was established in 1933. At the time, there were 17 families in Krasnoshchelye, of whom 13 were Komi, 2 were Sámi and 2 were Nenets. By 1966, the population had increased to 700 after the residents of Ivanovka, Kamenka and Ponoy were resettled in Krasnoshchelye.

== Climate ==
Climate data for Krasnoshchelye (extremes 1932–present)
Month	Jan	Feb	Mar	Apr	May	Jun	Jul	Aug	Sep	Oct	Nov	Dec	Year
Record high °C (°F)	4.6 (40.3)	5.1 (41.2)	9.3 (48.7)	17.1 (62.8)	27.9 (82.2)	31.7 (89.1)	33.9 (93.0)	31.7 (89.1)	24.4 (75.9)	13.7 (56.7)	8.4 (47.1)	6.4 (43.5)	33.9 (93.0)
Mean daily maximum °C (°F)	−8.5 (16.7)	−8.4 (16.9)	−3.4 (25.9)	2.0 (35.6)	8.1 (46.6)	15.1 (59.2)	19.1 (66.4)	15.8 (60.4)	10.5 (50.9)	2.8 (37.0)	−2.9 (26.8)	−5.5 (22.1)	3.7 (38.7)
Daily mean °C (°F)	−12.5 (9.5)	−12.3 (9.9)	−8.1 (17.4)	−2.3 (27.9)	3.8 (38.8)	10.0 (50.0)	13.9 (57.0)	11.2 (52.2)	6.7 (44.1)	0.4 (32.7)	−5.7 (21.7)	−8.9 (16.0)	−0.3 (31.4)
Mean daily minimum °C (°F)	−17.3 (0.9)	−16.9 (1.6)	−13.4 (7.9)	−6.9 (19.6)	−0.4 (31.3)	5.1 (41.2)	8.8 (47.8)	6.9 (44.4)	3.1 (37.6)	−2.3 (27.9)	−9.0 (15.8)	−12.9 (8.8)	−4.6 (23.7)
Record low °C (°F)	−44.7 (−48.5)	−48.8 (−55.8)	−41.7 (−43.1)	−34.1 (−29.4)	−19.0 (−2.2)	−4.6 (23.7)	−1.6 (29.1)	−4.3 (24.3)	−11.1 (12.0)	−26.2 (−15.2)	−34.3 (−29.7)	−44.0 (−47.2)	−48.8 (−55.8)
Average precipitation mm (inches)	33.2 (1.31)	29.0 (1.14)	29.4 (1.16)	28.8 (1.13)	47.4 (1.87)	59.6 (2.35)	68.2 (2.69)	71.1 (2.80)	49.5 (1.95)	54.7 (2.15)	38.5 (1.52)	39.5 (1.56)	548.9 (21.63)
Source: pogoda.ru.net
