= A with diaeresis =

A with diaeresis may refer to:

- A with diaeresis (Cyrillic), a conventional name of the letter Ӓ or ä from several Cyrillic alphabets: Gagauz, Khanty, Kildin Sami and Western Mari
- Ä, known as A with diaeresis or A with umlaut, a letter Ä or ä of Latin-based German, Estonian, Finnish, Slovak, Swedish, Romani and Turkmen alphabets
