= Aino Hivand =

Norwegian-Sami visual artist and children's book writer

Aino Hivand (born 3 May 1947) is a Norwegian-Sami visual artist and children's book writer with an expressionist and abstract style.

== Biography ==
Aino Hivand was born in Bugøyfjord, Sør-Varanger Municipality. She studied decorative arts at Dalane High School in the 1986/87 school year and studied at Stavanger School of Art, spring 1986. Hivand resides in Samuelsberg in Gáivuotna Municipality in Troms county.

== Exhibits ==
- 1989, Galleri du Nord, Stavanger
- 1991, Gallery Bryggerhuset, Egersund
- 1996, SDG, Sami Art Center, Karasjok
- 1999, Bugøyfjord Grendehus
- 1999, Savio Museum, Kirkenes
- 2001, Artist House, Gvarv
- 2006, Gallery NK, Vardø
- 2008, Finnmark county municipality's guest studio, Vadsø
- 2010, Parkalompolo, Sweden
- 2014, Várjjat Sámi Museums (Varanger Sami Museum)
- 2015, Contemporary Museum of Northern People

== Selected works ==
- 1997 Sáhpán-Bánni báhtara
- 2004 Čoarvevieksá Lieđđeriemut
- 2009 Muittátgo; Husker du
- 2014 Atrata
- 2016 Garjjáid gižžu; Ravnenes kamp, (barnebok, nordsamisk og norsk, tekst og illustrasjoner) Gollegiella forlag

== Awards and honors ==
- 1989, Arctic Product - product competition - 1st prize
- 1990, Project Neiden A / L - product competition - 1st and 2nd prize
- 1991, Sør-Varanger Joint Association - Logo competition - 1st prize
- 1992, Sør-Varanger Kongegave 1992 - 3rd prize
- 1996, Sálas - Logo competition - 1st prize
- 1998, Saami Council Literature Prize
- 2000, Jelovica Prize, from Word festival art on paper, Sloveni
- 2000, John Savio stipend
- 2001, SKFV, Travel Scholarship
- 2004, Sámiraddi / Sami Council Work Scholarship
- 2009, SKFV, Material Scholarship
- 2012, SKFV, Material Scholarship
