= Siri Broch Johansen =

Sámi author and language worker (born 1967)

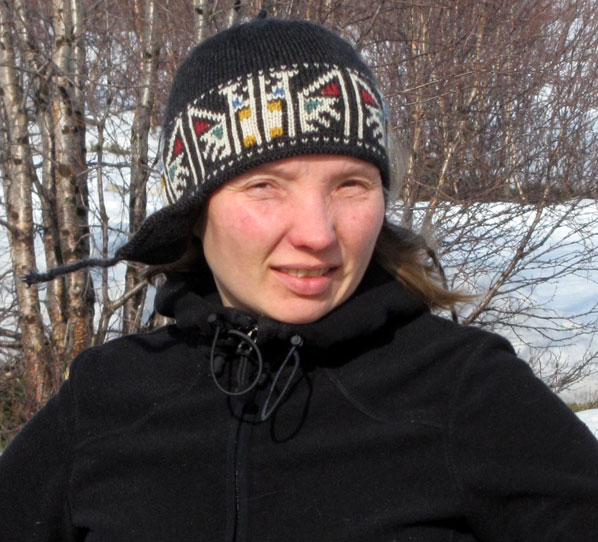
Broch Johansen in 2011

Siri Broch Johansen is a Norwegian Sámi author and language worker from Tana Municipality in Finnmark county, Norway.

She trains teachers in the Sámi language; she formerly taught in Kåfjord Municipality in Troms county. She has written and edited a textbook on indigenous peoples of the north, and has served as language leader at the Samisk Nærings- og Utredningssenter in Tana.

Broch Johansen won the Saami Council Literature Prize in 2016 for her young-adult novel Mun lean čuoigi.

== Works ==
- 1992 Opp av brønnen – Poetry
- 1997 Mii leat ain dás (Vi er ennå her) – textbook on indigenous peoples of the North (ISBN 82-7374-250-4)
- 2001 Mearrasámit
- 2005 Sámi skuvlahistorjá 1 (Sami school history) (ISBN 82-7374-575-9)
- 2007 Sámi skuvlahistorjá 2 (Sami school history) (ISBN 978-82-7374-666-5)
- 2009 Sámi skuvlahistorjá 3 (Sami school history) (ISBN 978-82-7374-730-3)
- 2016 Mun lean čuoigi (youth novel) (ISBN 978-82-8263-160-0)
- 2025 Ovllá – libretto of opera composed by Cecilia Damström
