= Inghilda Tapio =

Saami author, poet, translator and actress

Inger Gunhild Maria "Inghilda" Tapio (née Valkeapää, born February 1946 in Gárasavvon, Sweden) is a Saami author, poet, translator, and actress. She writes in both Northern Saami and Swedish.

== Biography ==
Inghilda Tapio grew up in a Saami reindeer herding family within the Könkämä Sámi reindeer herding village. When she was 7, she was forced to go live in a residential school since the Swedish Government had decided to do away with the mobile versions shortly before she had to go to school. After graduation, she studied Swedish, Northern Saami, English, and pedagogy at Umeå University. Later on, she studied art at Sunderby Folk High School and dramaturgy in Inari, Finland.

Afterwards, she has worked as an actress with the Sámi theaters Dálvadis and Giron Sámi Teáhter in Kiruna, Sweden and as a teacher. At the same time, she also dedicated herself to writing, drawing, and painting. In 1979, she made her literary debut with the book Mu luondu sámi luondu. In 1995, she won the Saami Council Literature Prize for the Northern Sámi anthology Ii fal dan dihte.

Tapio lives and works in the border town of Karesuando, where she was born. She and her family share a studio in Čuovžavuohppi where they create literature and artwork together.

In 2016, Australian film director Janet Merewether released a film called Reindeer In My Saami Heart, a portrait of Tapio.

== Awards and recognitions ==
- 1997 – Saami Council Literature Prize
- 2013 – Klockrikestipendiet (the Harry Martinson memorial grant) together with her daughter Ulrika Tapio Blind

== Bibliography (selected works) ==
- Beaivvit guhkkot otnot (in Northern Sami). Kárášjohka: Davvi girji. ISBN 9788232900787.
- Sámi muitalusat: bálggis davvisámi máinnasteapmái = Samiska sagor: en resa i nordsamiska historieberättande (in Northern Sami and Swedish). Harads: Varda. ISBN 9789197957465.
- Davvelis guovssonástti (in Northern Sami). Kárášjohka: Davvi girji. ISBN 9788273747990.
- Viiđat : divttat Sámis = Vidd : dikter från Sápmi (in Northern Sami and Swedish). Stockholm: Podium. 2006. ISBN 9789189196391.
- Ii fal dan dihte (in Northern Sami). Guovdageaidnu: DAT. ISBN 9788290625271.
- Mu luondu – sámi luondu (in Northern Sami). Tana: Jårgalæđđji.

=== In translation ===
Tapio's children's books have been translated into multiple Saami languages and her poetry into English, Spanish, German, and Icelandic.

- Domokos, Johanna; Rießler, Michael; Schlosser, Christine, eds. (2019). Worte verschwinden / fliegen / zum blauen Licht : Samische Lyrik von Joik bis Rap. Samica (in Northern Sami, Inari Sami, Kildin Sami, Skolt Sami, and German). Vol. 4. Freiburg: Albert-Ludwigs-Universität Freiburg. ISBN 9783981683530.
- Beyond the wolf line : an anthology of Sámi poetry. Translated by Sammallahti, Pekka; Selbourne, Anthony. Guildford: Making waves. 1996. ISBN 1873918100.

== Literature about Inghilda Tapio ==
- Skriftbilder : Samisk litteraturhistorie. Gielas Gillii, Mielas Millii (in Norwegian). Vol. 2. Kárášjohka: Davvi girji. 1998. ISBN 9788273743534.
- Nordisk kvinnolitteraturhistoria (in Swedish). Vol. 5. Höganäs: Wiken. ISBN 9171192638.
