= Iraida Vinogradova =

- Born: Iraida Vladimirovna Matryokhina; 10 March 1936; Chalmny-Varre, Murmansk Okrug, USSR
- Died: 31 December 2004 (aged 68); Russia
- Education: A. I. Herzen Leningrad State Pedagogical Institute
- Occupations: Poet, singer, scholar
- Writing career
- Language: Russian, Kildin Sámi, Ter Sámi

Iraida Vladimirovna Vinogradova (née Matryokhina, Russian: Ираида Владимировна Виноградова née Матрёхина, 10 March 1936 Chalmny-Varre, Murmansk Okrug, USSR — 31 December 2004 Russia) was a Soviet and Russian Sámi poet who wrote in both Kildin Sámi and Russian, singer of Sámi songs, an author of teaching materials for Kildin Sámi language, and a member of the Kola Sámi Association (Kildin Sami: Куэлнэгк Соаме Э̄хтнэгк, Russian: Ассоциация кольских саамов).

== Early life and education ==
Iraida Vladimirovna Matryokhina was born on 10 March 1936 in the village of Chalmny-Varre, Murmansk Okrug, USSR, one of six children born into the reindeer herding family of Klavdiya Grigoryevna Matryohkina (Russian: Клавдия Григорьевна Матрёхина) and Vladimir Mikhailovich Matryokhin (Russian: Владимир Михайлович Матрёхин). Her mother was from a Sámi family of hunters and her father was Russian, from a family of Orthodox priests from Lovozero. Her sisters Oktyabrina and Tamara are famous in their own right: Oktyabrina Voronova is also a famous poet and Tamara is the linguist T. V. Matryokhina.

Vinogradova graduated from the Department of the Peoples of the North in the A. I. Herzen Leningrad State Pedagogical Institute. After graduating, she worked as a teacher in the villages of Zelenoborsky, Monchegorsk, and Olenegorsk.

Vinogradova has written poetry for children and adults, both in Russian and in Kildin Sámi. In addition to her poetry, she was involved in creating the current standard orthography and teaching materials for Kildin Sámi.

== Awards ==
In 1994, Vinogradova and Elvira Galkina won the first ever Saami Council Literature Prize together but for separate Kildin Saami books that were later translated into Northern Saami and published as bilingual Kildin Saami-Northern Saami books. Vinogradova won the literature prize for the book Мун ка̄нҍц – Mu ustibat and Galkina for the book Пе̄ййвьесь пе̄ййв – Šerres beaivi, both poetry for children in Kildin Sámi.

== Bibliography ==
- Куруч Р. Д.; Виноградова И. В.; Яковлева Р. И. Соагкнэһкь. Саамско-русский и русско-саамский словарь для начальной саамской школы. Пособие для учащихся начальной школы. Murmansk, 1991.
- Афанасьева Н. Е.; Виноградова И. В.; Куруч Р. Д.; Мечкина Е. М.; Яковлева Р. И. Pūdz’jenč. 3 klass guėjkė lōgkėm knīga = Olešek. Kniga dlja dopolnitel’nogo čtenija v 3-em klasse saamskoj školy. Moscow-Murmansk, 1991.
- Мой друзья. Стихи для детей. – Murmansk, 1992
- Афанасьева Н. Е.; Виноградова И. В.; Куруч Р. Д.. Правила орфографии и пунктуации саамского языка. Москва-Murmansk, 1995.
- Мун ка̄нҍц: [Парна стиха]. — Murmansk, 1991.
- Мун ка̄нҍц — Mu ustibat. — Kautokeino, 1994.
- Miŋgá — Мӣннькай. — Kautokeino, 2003.
- Buhtes gáldut — Чӣллк ка̄йв — Kautokeino, 2003.
- Без тебя с тобой. Избранное. — Murmansk, 2012.
