= Ellen Marie Vars =

Norwegian Sami writer (born 1957)

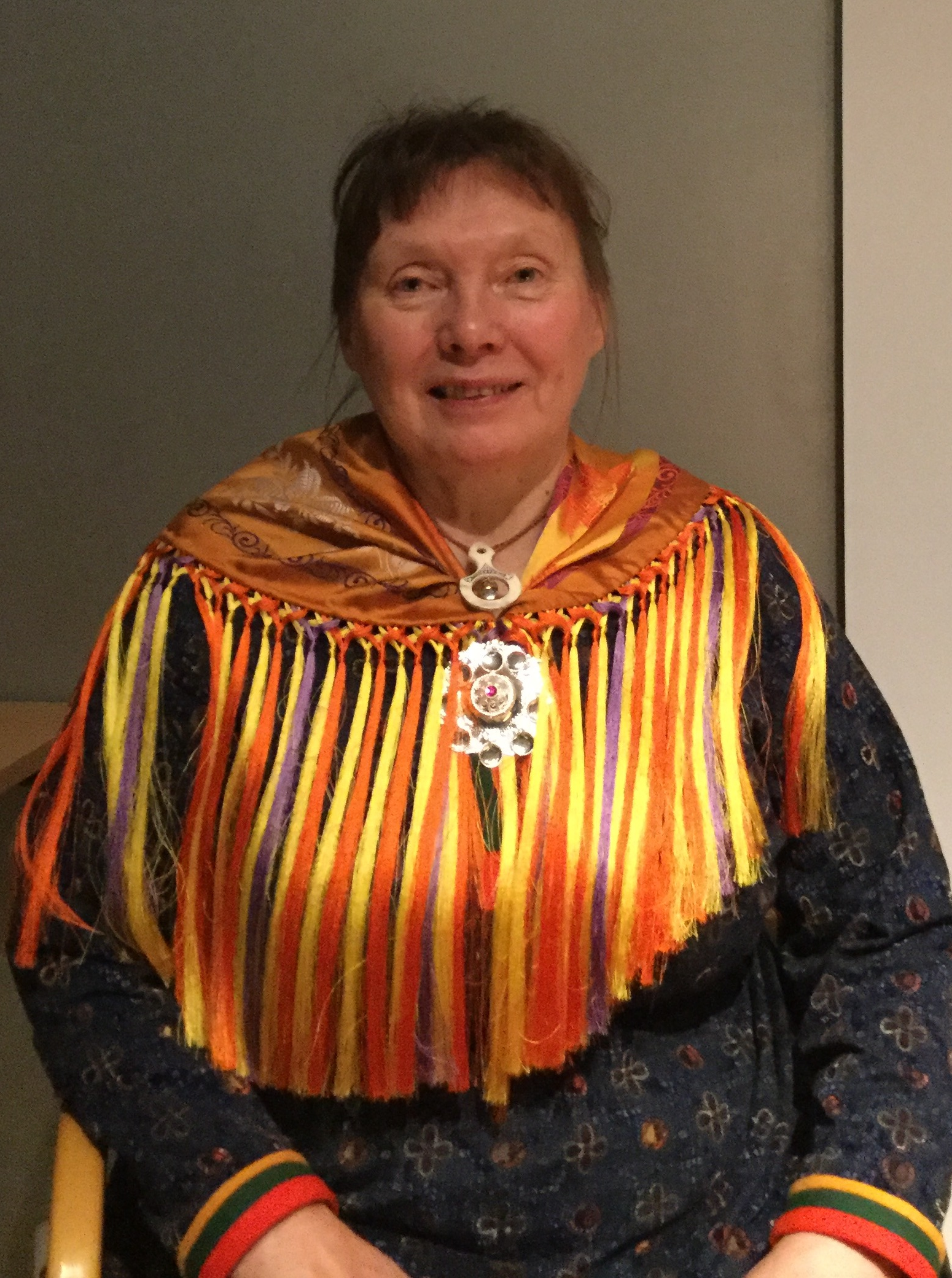
- Vars in 2016
- Born: 12 August 1957 (age 69); Láhpoluoppal, Kautokeino, Norway
- Occupation: novelist
- Awards: Saami Council's literary prize (2005)

Ellen Marie Vars (born 12 August 1957) is a Norwegian Sami writer.

== Biography ==
Ellen Marie Vars was born in Láhpoluoppal in Kautokeino Municipality.

== Literary career ==
She made her literary debut in 1986 with the youth novel Kátjá , one of the most read Sami books in Norway. Her novel Čábbámus iđitguovssu earned her the Saami Council Literature Prize in 2005. Čábbámus iđitguovssu has been translated into English as The most beautiful dawn, and illustrated by Trygve Lund Guttormsen.

She was the first chief editor of the Sami language newspaper Áššu, from its establishment in 1993.
