= Korabelnoye =

Korabelnoye Корабельное
- Inhabited locality
- Interactive map of Korabelnoye
- Location of Korabelnoye Korabelnoye (Murmansk Oblast)
- Coordinates: 67°01′N 41°17′E
- Country: Russia
- Federal subject: Murmansk Oblast
- Elevation: 27 m (89 ft)

Population (2010 Census)
  - Total: 10
  - Estimate (2021): 0 (−100%)

Administrative status
  - Subordinated to: closed administrative-territorial formation of Ostrovnoy

Municipal status
  - Urban okrug: Ostrovnoy Urban Okrug
- Time zone: UTC+3 (MSK)
- Postal code: 184640
- Dialing code: +7 81558
- OKTMO ID: 47731000116

Korabelnoye (Russian: Корабельное) is a rural locality (an inhabited locality) in administrative jurisdiction of the closed administrative-territorial formation of Ostrovnoy in Murmansk Oblast, Russia, located beyond the Arctic Circle on the Kola Peninsula at a height of 27 meters (89 ft) above sea level. As of the 2010 Census, its population was 10.
