= Lumbovka =

- Native name: Лумбовка (Russian)

Location
- Country: Russia
- Region: Murmansk Oblast

Physical characteristics
- Source: Kola Peninsula
- Mouth: White Sea
  - location: Lumbovsky Gulf
  - coordinates: 67.6974°N 40.3899°E
- Length: 80 km (50 mi)
- Basin size: 1,040 km^{2} (400 sq mi)

The Lumbovka (Russian: Лумбовка) is a river in the north of the Kola Peninsula in Murmansk Oblast, Russia. It is 80 kilometres (50 mi) long, and has a drainage basin of 1,040 square kilometres (400 sq mi). The Lumbovka flows into the Lumbovsky Gulf of the White Sea.
