= Mys-Chyorny =

Mys-Chyorny Мыс-Чёрный
- Inhabited locality
- Interactive map of Mys-Chyorny
- Location of Mys-Chyorny Mys-Chyorny (Murmansk Oblast)
- Coordinates: 68°22′N 38°39′E
- Country: Russia
- Federal subject: Murmansk Oblast

Population (2010 Census)
  - Total: 8
  - Estimate (2021): 0 (−100%)

Administrative status
  - Subordinated to: closed administrative-territorial formation of Ostrovnoy

Municipal status
  - Urban okrug: Ostrovnoy Urban Okrug
- Time zone: UTC+3 (MSK)
- Postal code: 184640
- Dialing code: +7 81558
- OKTMO ID: 47731000126

Mys-Chyorny (Russian: Мыс-Чёрный, lit. 'black cape') is a rural locality (an inhabited locality) in administrative jurisdiction of the closed administrative-territorial formation of Ostrovnoy in Murmansk Oblast, Russia, located on the Kola Peninsula, beyond the Arctic Circle, at an elevation of 1 meter (3 ft 3 in) above sea level. As of the 2010 Census, its population was 8.
