= Purnach =

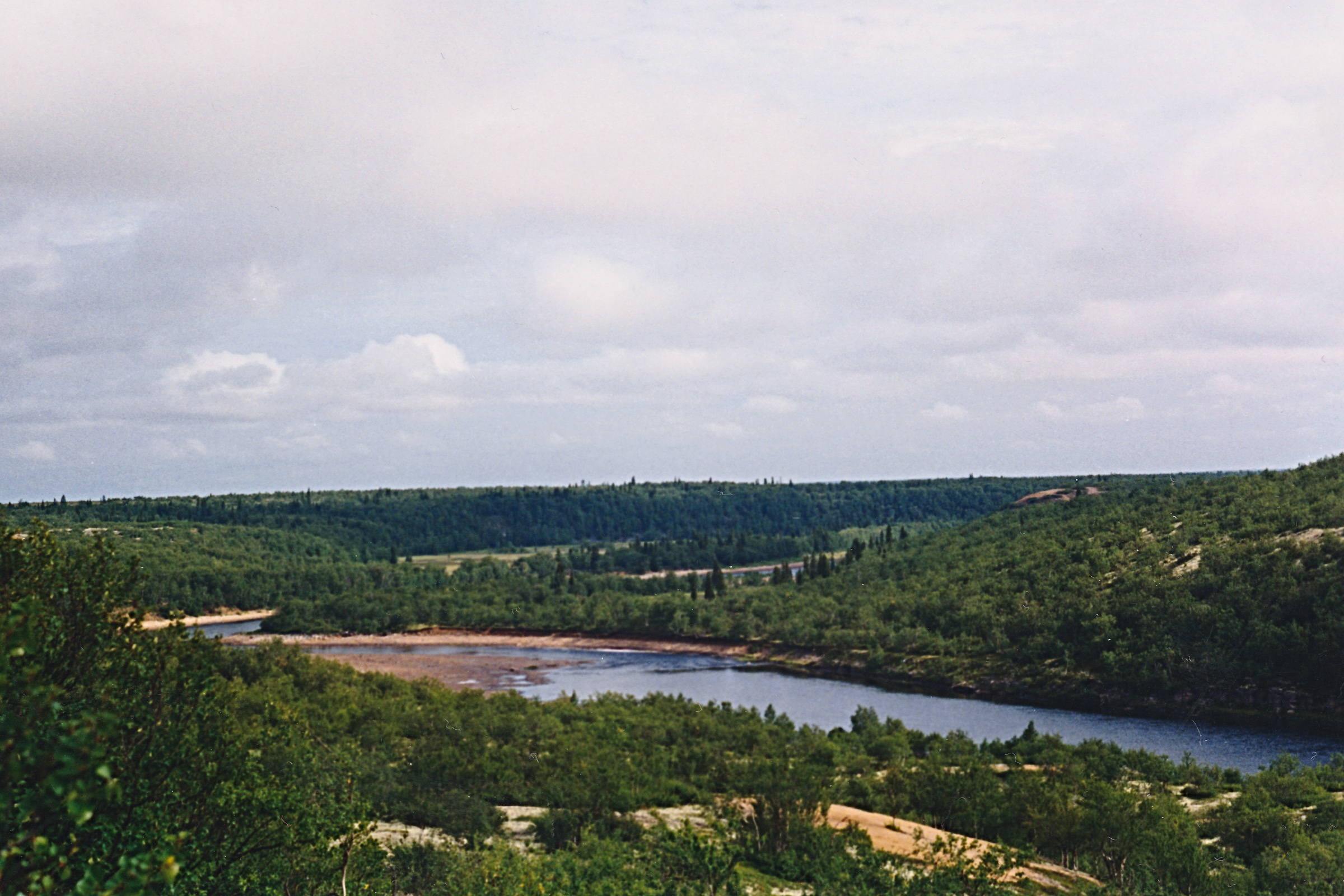

Location
- Country: Russia

Physical characteristics
- Mouth: Ponoy
  - coordinates: 67.0292°N 40.2221°E
- Length: 137 km (85 mi)
- Basin size: 1,600 km^{2} (620 sq mi)

Basin features
- Progression: Ponoy→ White Sea

The Purnach is a right tributary to the river Ponoy on the Kola Peninsula, Russia. The Purnach runs to the south of and roughly parallel to the Ponoy. The confluence of the two rivers is 77 km upstream from where the Ponoy flows into the White Sea. It is 137 kilometres (85 mi) long, and has a drainage basin of 1,600 square kilometres (620 sq mi).
