= Lovozero air base =

Lovozero
- IATA: none; ICAO: ULML

Summary
- Airport type: Military
- Operator: Russian Air Force
- Location: Lovozero
- Elevation AMSL: 499 ft / 152 m
- Coordinates: 68°1′18″N 035°0′0″E
- Interactive map of Lovozero

Runways
Direction	Length		Surface
Direction	ft	m	Surface
07/25	3,609	1,100	Concrete

Lovozero was a military air base in Murmansk Oblast, Russia, located 2 kilometers (1.2 mi) northwest of Lovozero. It served as a helicopter base, but is rumoured to have turned civilian.
