= Saami Council Literature Prize =

Annual literary award for Saami literature

The Saami Council Literature Prize (Northern Sami: Sámiráđi girjjalašvuođa bálkkašumi, Inari Sami: Sämirääđi kirjálâšvuođâpalhâšume and Finnish: Saamelaisneuvoston kirjallisuuspalkinto) is a literary prize for Saami literature first awarded by the Saami Council in 1994. At first, the prize was awarded annually; however, starting in 2003, it has been awarded roughly once every two years, with authors of children's and young adult literature being honored every other time.

In 2007, the total monetary value of the prize was 3,000 euros.

== Background ==
The Saami Council launched its own literary award to encourage people to write in the Saami languages. For this reason, all works nominated for the award must have been initially written in one of the Saami languages or translated from another into one of the smaller Saami languages. Only works published within the two years preceding the award are eligible for nomination.

== Laureates ==
| Year | Work | Author(s) | Illustrator |
|---|---|---|---|
| 1994 | Мун ка̄нҍц - Mu ustibat | Iraida Vinogradova | Peter Popov |
| 1994 | Пе̄ййвьесь пе̄ййв - Šerres beaivi | Elvira Galkina | Jakov Jakovlev |
| 1995 | Juohkásan várri | Olavi Paltto | |
| 1996 | Hoŋkoŋ dohkká | Ulla Pirttijärvi | |
| 1997 | Ii fal dan dihte | Inghilda Tapio | Ulrika Tapio |
| 1998 | Jåvvå | Gun Aira já Ingegerd Vannar | Aino Hivand |
| 1999 | Bearralat Deatnogáttis | Eino V. Guttorm | |
| 2000 | Biehtár ja Duommá jávren stulliba | Stig Riemmbe Gælok | Kjell Ove Storvik |
| 2001 | Suoláduvvan | Kirsti Paltto | |
| 2002 | Čiežain čáziin | Harald Gaski | Lars Nordström |
| 2003 | Árbbolaččat 2 | Jovnna-Ánde Vest | |
| 2005 | Čábbámus Iđitguovssu | Elle Márjá Vars | Trygve Lund Guttormsen |
| 2006 | Meahci šuvas bohciidit ságat | Synnøve Persen | |
| 2007 | Máilmmi láikkimus olmmoš | Elle Márjá Vars | Harald Aadnevik |
| 2009 | Lihkkošalmmái | Rauni Magga Lukkari | |
| 2012 | Sárá beaivegirji | Siri Broch Johansen | Bjørg Monsen Vars |
| 2014 | Amas amas amasmuvvat | Niillas Holmberg | Antti Väre |
| 2016 | Mun lean čuoigi | Siri Broch Johansen | |
| 2018 | Áhčči min | Rauni Manninen | |
| 2020 | Luohtojávrri oainnáhusat | Kirste Paltto | Sunna Kitti |
| 2022 | Gárži | Sara Vuolab | |
