= Lumbovsky Bay =

Gulf of the White Sea, Russia

Coordinates: 67.8091667°N 40.4055556°E

Lumbovsky Bay (Russian: Лумбовский залив, Lumbovsky zaliv) is an inlet of the White Sea. It is the largest inlet along the Tersky Coast of the Kola Peninsula.
