= Kirsti Paltto =

Sámi author

- Born: Kirste Paltto; 11 February 1947 (age 78); Utsjoki, Finland

Kirste (Kirsti) Paltto (born 11 February 1947) is a Sámi author who writes mainly in Northern Sámi. Her books have been translated into several languages, including Finnish, German, Norwegian, English, Inari Sámi and Hungarian. Paltto currently resides in Utsjoki.

== Bibliography ==
=== Children's and young-adult books ===
- Vilges geađgi (1980, illustrated by Tuula Mukka)
- Go Ráhkun bođii Skáhpenjárgii (1982)
- Golleozat. Sápmelaš álbmotmáidnasa vuođul (1984, illustrated by Merja Aletta Ranttila)
- Dávggáš ja násti (1988, illustrated by Sigga-Marja Magga)
- Divga (1990, illustrated by Mika Launis)
- Urbi (1994)
- Ája (2007, illustrated by Inghilda Tapio)

=== Poetry ===
- Riđđunjárga (1970)
- Beaivváža bajásdánsun (1985)
- Beštoriin (1997)

=== Fiction ===
- Soagŋu (1971, short stories)
- Risten (1981, short stories)
- Guhtoset dearvan min bohccot (1987)
- Guovtteoaivvat nisu (1989, short stories)
- Guržo luottat (1991)
- 256 golláža (1992)
- Suoláduvvan (2001 short stories)
- Násttit muohtagierragis (2007)

=== Plays ===
- Liemmajoen Anni (Rovaniemi City Theater 1976)
- Maahiset (radio play, YLE 1977)
- Háhtežanáhkku (children's play, Puppet Theater Kuukkeli 1978)
- Niilan porovaara, (radio play, YLE 1981)
- Eatnanvulošája (children's radio play, Sámi Radio 1985)
- Jiella (radio play, YLE 1990)
- Dat ráhkesvuohta (Rávgos Theater 1994)
- Gáiggonat (Rávgos Theater 1995)
- Váimboustibat (Rávgos Theater 1996)
- Girill von Dáktelus (Rávgos Theater 1999)
- Boahtteáigái (Rávgoš Theater 2003)

=== Other literary works ===
- Saamelaiset (pamphlet from 1973)
- Savvon. Sámi Girječálliid Searvi antologiija (editor, 1983)
- Aitmatov: Girjját beatnaga dievva (translated in co-operation with Eino Kuokkanen 1993)

== Awards ==
- Sokeain kuunnelmapalkinto 1977
- Cultural Award from the Province of Lapland in Finland 1977
- Short-listed for the Finlandia Prize 1986
- Cultural Award from the Sami Parliament of Finland 1997
- The Helen Prize (2000)
- Saami Council Literature Prize 2001
