= Lumbovka, Murmansk Oblast =

Lumbovka Лумбовка
- Inhabited locality
- Interactive map of Lumbovka
- Location of Lumbovka Lumbovka (Murmansk Oblast)
- Coordinates: 67°44′N 40°31′E
- Country: Russia
- Federal subject: Murmansk Oblast
- Elevation: 5 m (16 ft)

Population (2010 Census)
  - Total: 11
  - Estimate (2021): 21 (+90.9%)

Administrative status
  - Subordinated to: closed administrative-territorial formation of Ostrovnoy

Municipal status
  - Urban okrug: Ostrovnoy Urban Okrug
- Time zone: UTC+3 (MSK)
- Postal code: 184640
- Dialing code: +7 81558
- OKTMO ID: 47731000111

Lumbovka (Russian: Лумбовка) is a rural locality (an inhabited locality) in administrative jurisdiction of the closed administrative-territorial formation of Ostrovnoy in Murmansk Oblast, Russia, located on the Kola Peninsula, beyond the Arctic Circle, at an elevation of 1 meter (3 ft 3 in) above sea level. As of the 2010 Census, its population was 11.
