= Revda, Murmansk Oblast =

Revda Ревда
- Urban-type settlement
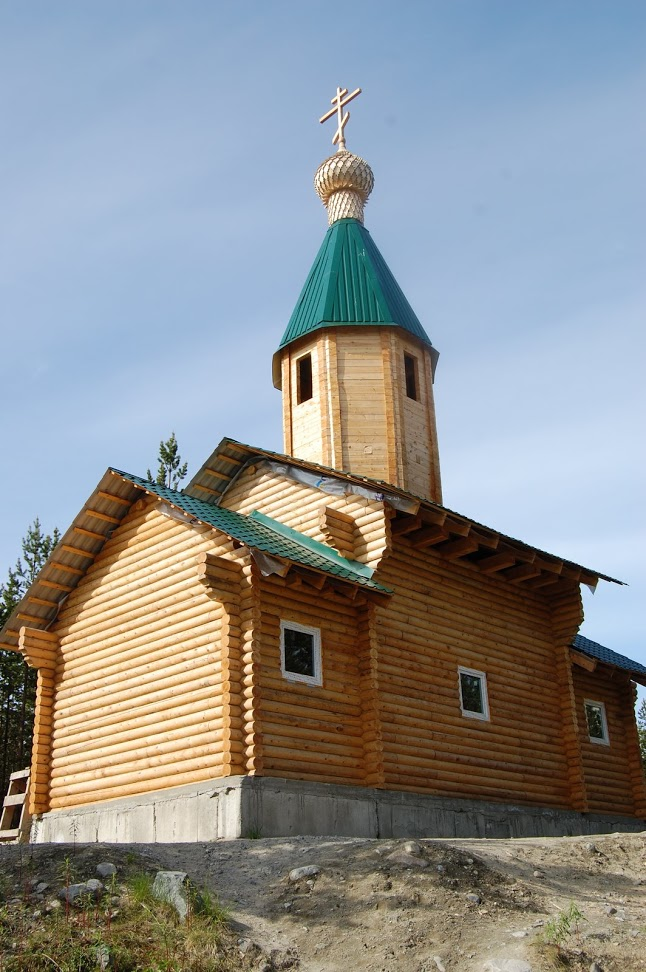

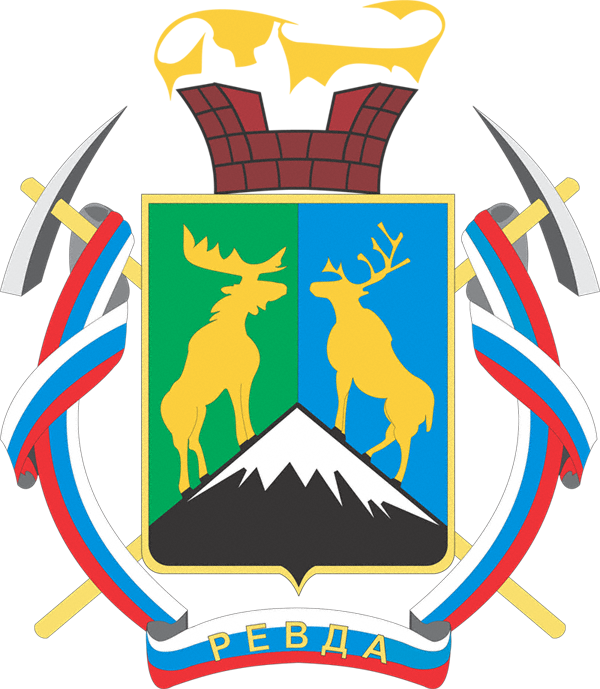
- Coat of arms
- Interactive map of Revda
- Location of Revda Revda (Murmansk Oblast)
- Coordinates: 67.9372°N 34.5594°E
- Country: Russia
- Federal subject: Murmansk Oblast
- Administrative district: Lovozersky District
- Founded: 1950
- Elevation: 301 m (988 ft)

Population (2010 Census)
  - Total: 8,414
  - Estimate (2025): 6,243 (−25.8%)

Municipal status
  - Municipal district: Lovozersky Municipal District
  - Urban settlement: Revda Urban Settlement
- Time zone: UTC+3 (MSK)
- Postal code: 184580
- Dialing code: +7 81538
- OKTMO ID: 47610154051

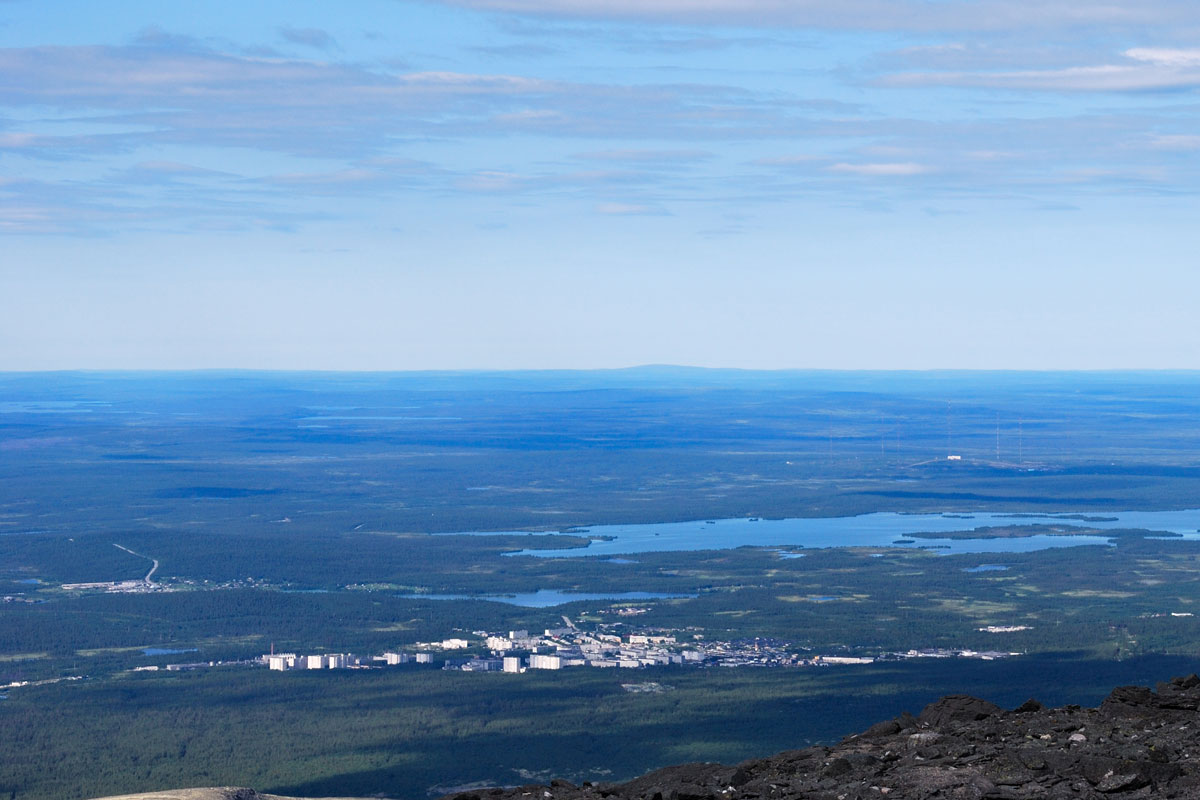
Revda and the Alpha transmitter

Revda (Russian: Ревда) is an urban locality (an urban-type settlement) in Lovozersky District of Murmansk Oblast, Russia, located 149 kilometers (93 mi) southeast of Murmansk. Population: 8,414 (2010 census); 10,368 (2002 census); 13,820 (1989 Soviet census).

It was founded in 1950 as a loparite ore mining and processing settlement.

To the north of Revda, one of the Russian Alpha transmitters is located.

In 2009, Barents Observer reported that Revda was likely to be closed down and its inhabitants relocated, due to the collapse of the mining industry.
