= Lovozersky District =

Lovozersky District Ловозерский район (Russian)
- District
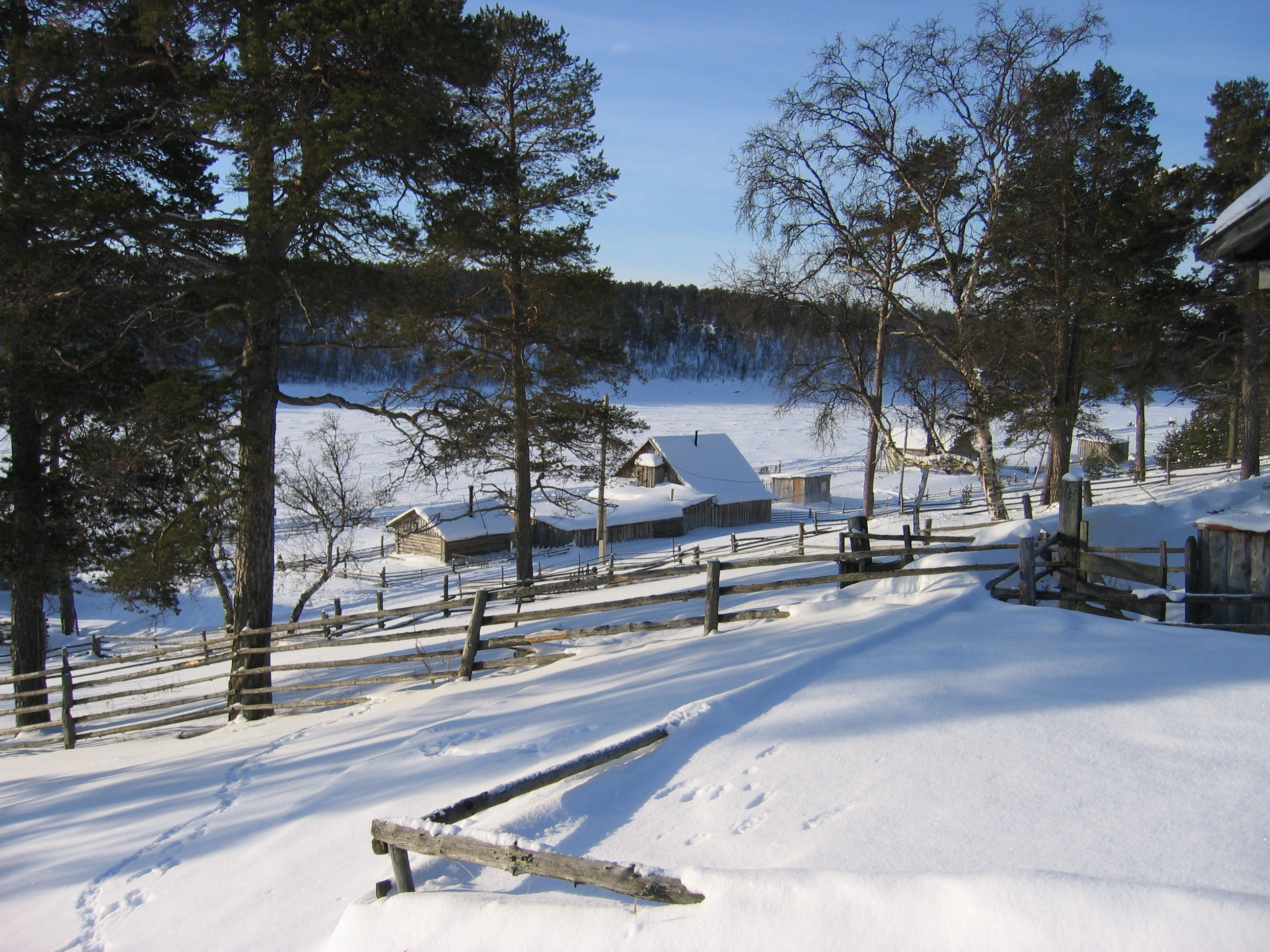
- View of the selo of Kanevka in Lovozersky District

- Coat of arms
- Location of Lovozersky District in Murmansk Oblast
- Coordinates: 67°00′N 38°00′E
- Country: Russia
- Federal subject: Murmansk Oblast
- Established: August 1, 1927
- Administrative center: Lovozero

Government
  - Type: Local government
  - Body: Council of Deputies
  - Head: Dmitry Pisarev

Area
  - Total: 53,800 km^{2} (20,800 sq mi)

Population (2010 Census)
  - Total: 11,820
  - Density: 0.220/km^{2} (0.569/sq mi)
  - Urban: 71.2%
  - Rural: 28.8%

Administrative structure
  - Inhabited localities: 1 urban-type settlements, 4 rural localities

Municipal structure
  - Municipally incorporated as: Lovozersky Municipal District
  - Municipal divisions: 1 urban settlements, 1 rural settlements
- Time zone: UTC+3 (MSK)
- OKTMO ID: 47610000
- Website: http://www.lovozeroadm.ru/

Lovozersky District (Russian: Лово́зерский райо́н) is an administrative district (raion), one of the six in Murmansk Oblast, Russia. Municipally, it is incorporated as Lovozersky Municipal District. It occupies most of the central and northeastern parts of the Kola Peninsula. The area of the district is 53,800 square kilometers (20,800 sq mi). Its administrative center is the rural locality (a selo) of Lovozero. District's population: 11,820 (2010 census); 14,311 (2002 census); 18,263 (1989 Soviet census). The population of Lovozero accounts for 24.3% of the district's total population.

== Geography ==
The territory of the district encompasses almost the entire northern half of the Kola Peninsula, excluding the town of Ostrovnoy. The Ponoy and Yokanga Rivers flow through the district's territory. The Kandalaksha Nature Reserve, a federal-level strict ecological reserve, covers a portion of the Barents Sea coast on the north of Lovozersky District.

== History ==
The district was established on August 1, 1927, when the All-Russian Central Executive Committee (VTsIK) issued two Resolutions: "On the Establishment of Leningrad Oblast" and "On the Borders and Composition of the Okrugs of Leningrad Oblast". According to these resolutions, Murmansk Governorate was transformed into Murmansk Okrug, which was divided into six districts (Lovozersky being one of them) and included into Leningrad Oblast. The administrative center of the district was established in the selo of Lovozero.

On July 31, 1930, the administrative commission of the Leningrad Executive Committee granted the district an ethnic status. The Presidium of the Leningrad Oblast Executive Committee confirmed this decision on January 7, 1931.

In 1934, the Murmansk Okrug Executive Committee developed a redistricting proposal, which was approved by the Resolution of the 4th Plenary Session of the Murmansk Okrug Committee of the VKP(b) on December 28-29, 1934 and by the Resolution of the Presidium of the Murmansk Okrug Executive Committee on February 2, 1935. On February 15, 1935, the VTsIK approved the redistricting of the okrug into seven districts, although it did not specify what territories the new districts were to include. On February 26, 1935, the Presidium of the Leningrad Oblast Executive Committee worked out the details of the new district scheme and issued a resolution, which, among other things, transferred Kildinsky Selsoviet of the former Kolsko-Loparsky District to Lovozersky District. However, Chalmny-Varrsky and Semiostrovsky Selsoviets of Lovozersky District were transferred to Saamsky District. Chalmny-Varrsky Selsoviet, however, did not remain in Saamsky District for long—the VTsIK Resolution of September 10, 1937 transferred it back to Lovozersky District.

When Saamsky District was abolished on January 26, 1963, its selsoviets were transferred to Lovozersky District.

On December 26, 1962, when the Presidium of the Supreme Soviet of the RSFSR decreed to re-organize the Soviets of People's Deputies and the executive committees of the krais, oblasts, and districts into the industrial and agricultural soviets, Murmansk Oblast was not affected and kept one unified Oblast Soviet and the executive committee. Nevertheless, on February 1, 1963, the Decree by the Presidium of the Supreme Soviet of the RSFSR established the new structure of the districts of Murmansk Oblast, which classified Lovozersky District as rural. However, this classification only lasted for less than two years. The November 21, 1964 Decree by the Presidium of the Supreme Soviet of the RSFSR restored the unified Soviets of People's Deputies and the executive committees of the krais and oblasts where the division into the urban and rural districts was introduced in 1962, and the districts of Murmansk Oblast were re-categorized as regular districts again by the January 12, 1965 Presidium of the Supreme Soviet of the RSFSR Decree.

== Demographics ==
Some of the district's population is Sámi, who are indigenous to the area.

There are also some Izhma Komi, who migrated there by the end of the 19th century from what is now the Nenets Autonomous Okrug. The 2002 Russian census recorded 1,128 of them.
