= Lovozero (rural locality) =

Lovozero Ловозеро
- Selo

Other transcription(s)
  - Ter Sami: Lïjavv’r
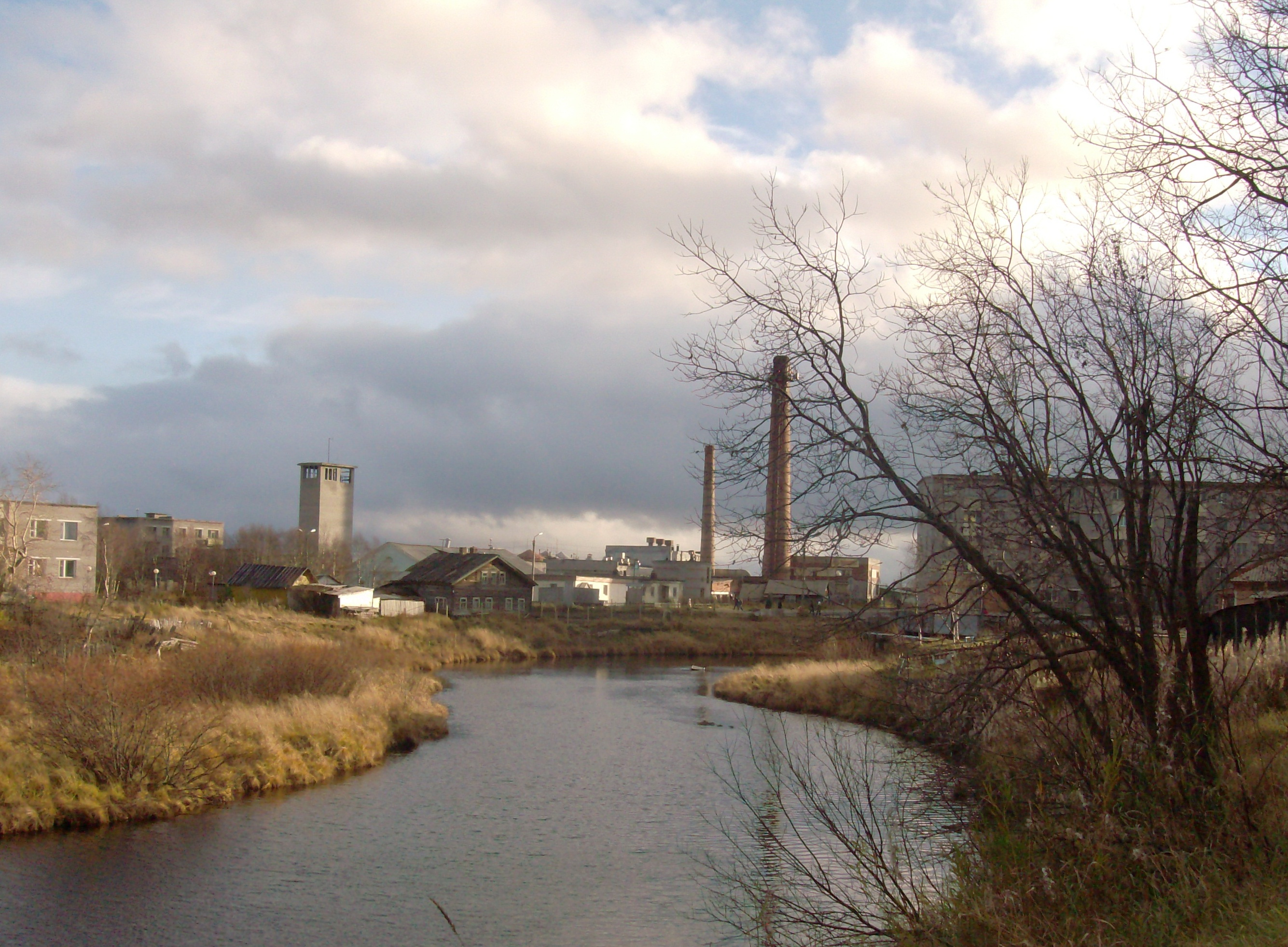
- Lovozero stands on the Virma River

- Coat of arms
- Interactive map of Lovozero
- Location of Lovozero Lovozero (Murmansk Oblast)
- Coordinates: 68°00′N 35°01′E
- Country: Russia
- Federal subject: Murmansk Oblast
- Administrative district: Lovozersky District
- First mentioned: 1608

Population (2010 Census)
  - Total: 2,871
  - Estimate (2021): 2,110 (−26.5%)

Administrative status
  - Capital of: Lovozersky District

Municipal status
  - Municipal district: Lovozersky Municipal District
  - Rural settlement: Lovozero Rural Settlement
  - Capital of: Lovozersky Municipal District, Lovozero Rural Settlement
- Time zone: UTC+3 (MSK)
- Postal codes: 184591, 184592
- Dialing code: +7 81538
- OKTMO ID: 47610401101

Lovozero (Russian: Лово́зеро; Kildin Sami: Луя̄ввьр) is a rural locality (a selo) and the administrative center of Lovozersky District in Murmansk Oblast, Russia, located on both banks of the Virma River, which is not far from Lake Lovozero, and 164 kilometers (102 mi) southeast of Murmansk, the administrative center of the oblast. Population: 2,871 (2010 census); 3,141 (2002 census); 3,638 (1989 Soviet census). It is the second largest locality in the district after Revda.

== History ==
In 1574, the settlement of Loyyavrsiyt (literally, "settlement of strong people by the lake") was founded at the site of modern Lovozero. Lovozero itself is first mentioned in chronicles in 1608.

== Economy ==
The main business in Lovozero is the agricultural and reindeer husbandry cooperative Tundra. Fishing, hunting, and picking cloudberries are also important.

=== Transportation ===
The closest railway station is in Olenegorsk, located 85 kilometers (53 mi) to the west.

== Military ==
A military helicopter base is located 2 kilometers (1.2 mi) to the southeast.

== Culture ==
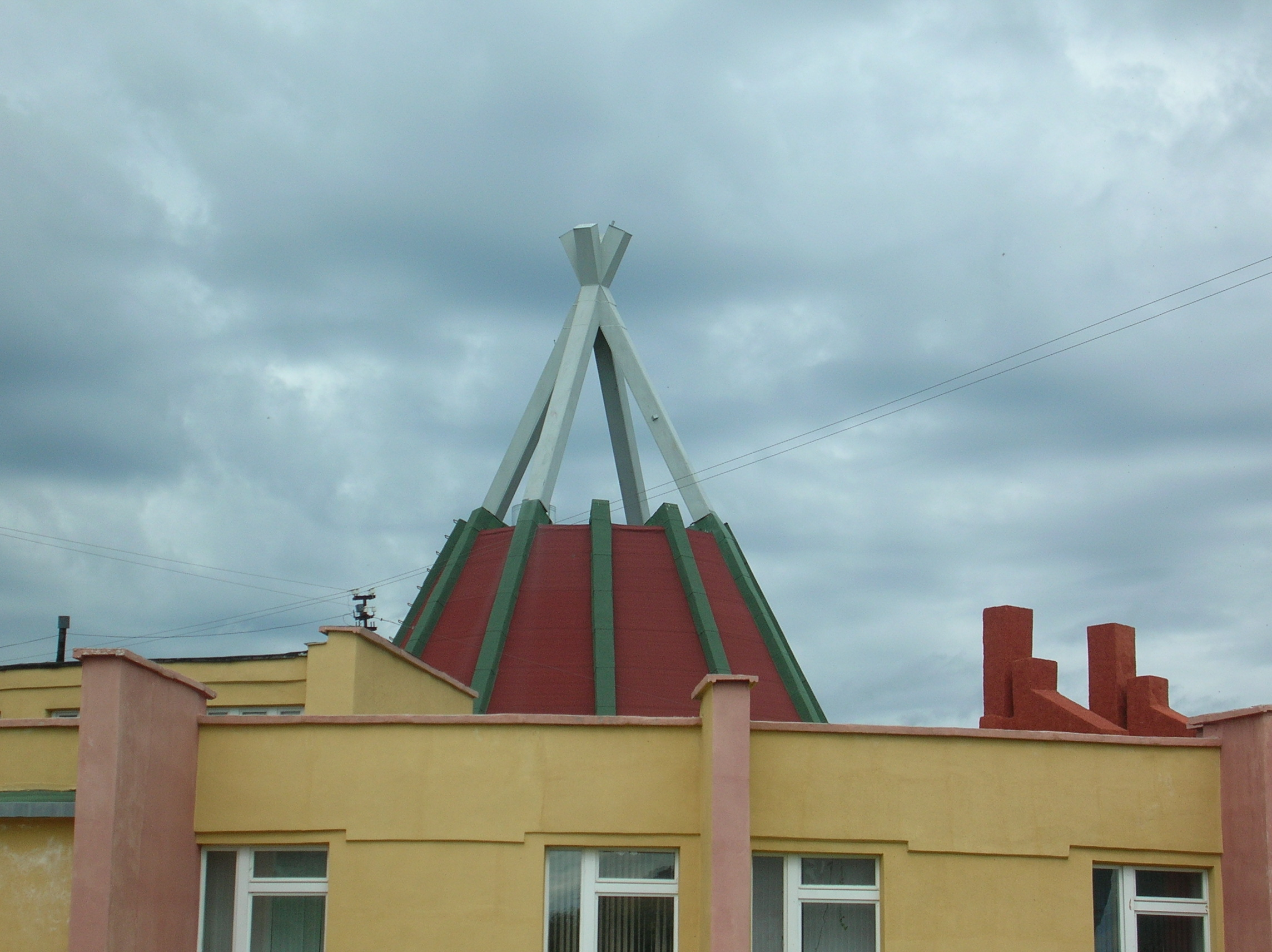
Sami national cultural center in Lovozero

Lovozero is often called "the Sami capital of Russia" due it being a center for Sami culture in Russia both historically and present. During the Political repression in the Soviet Union, when Sami people just like many other minority groups in the Soviet Union was displaced, most Samis ended up in Lovozero. In the 1990s, a Sami cultural museum was established in Lovozero in order to keep the Sami culture on the Kola Peninsula alive, although today Samis are a minority in Lovozero (about 1/4 of the population in Lovozero) with most inhabitants today being Russians or Komi. Several Sami festivals are also held in Lovozero.

== Climate ==
Lovozero has a subarctic climate due to its high latitude. In spite of this, the climate is a lot less severe than other Russian climates further east. Even so, it is colder than areas to the west that are a lot milder due to a greater Gulf Stream influence, with mean temperatures of below −13 °C (9 °F) in the two coldest months. In summer, temperatures can briefly spike to 30 °C (86 °F) or above due to southerly winds over the vast landmass, although the proximity to the chilly Arctic Ocean also cools down that season. Winters are drier than summers, but still snowy enough to build a reliable snow pack for several months. Due to the relatively mild July months, Lovozero is below the Arctic tree line.

== Religion ==
There is one Orthodox Church church building in Lovozero called the Church of the Epiphany. The church was first opened in 1862, then burned down in 1896 but was quickly rebuilt in 1897. During the Soviet era the church was shut down and was instead used as a local clubhouse. In 1996, the church was reopened for worship again.

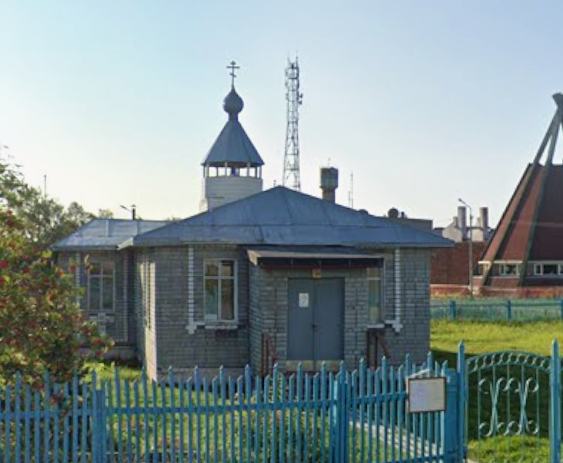
The Orthodox Church in Lovozero

Climate data for Lovozero
Month	Jan	Feb	Mar	Apr	May	Jun	Jul	Aug	Sep	Oct	Nov	Dec	Year
Record high °C (°F)	13.0 (55.4)	7.6 (45.7)	9.8 (49.6)	16.1 (61.0)	26.1 (79.0)	31.0 (87.8)	32.0 (89.6)	29.4 (84.9)	22.9 (73.2)	14.2 (57.6)	11.0 (51.8)	9.9 (49.8)	32.0 (89.6)
Mean daily maximum °C (°F)	−9.3 (15.3)	−9.8 (14.4)	−4.2 (24.4)	1.3 (34.3)	6.9 (44.4)	14.0 (57.2)	17.5 (63.5)	14.6 (58.3)	9.3 (48.7)	2.3 (36.1)	−4.1 (24.6)	−7.0 (19.4)	2.6 (36.7)
Daily mean °C (°F)	−13.4 (7.9)	−14.0 (6.8)	−8.8 (16.2)	−2.9 (26.8)	2.9 (37.2)	9.5 (49.1)	13.1 (55.6)	10.5 (50.9)	5.8 (42.4)	−0.5 (31.1)	−7.2 (19.0)	−10.9 (12.4)	−1.3 (29.6)
Mean daily minimum °C (°F)	−18.7 (−1.7)	−19.9 (−3.8)	−14.9 (5.2)	−8.4 (16.9)	−1.1 (30.0)	4.6 (40.3)	8.1 (46.6)	5.9 (42.6)	2.0 (35.6)	−3.8 (25.2)	−11.5 (11.3)	−16.2 (2.8)	−6.2 (20.9)
Record low °C (°F)	−46.4 (−51.5)	−43.6 (−46.5)	−41.0 (−41.8)	−31.7 (−25.1)	−20.0 (−4.0)	−4.3 (24.3)	−0.3 (31.5)	−5.6 (21.9)	−10.0 (14.0)	−26.1 (−15.0)	−37.0 (−34.6)	−43.0 (−45.4)	−46.4 (−51.5)
Average precipitation mm (inches)	27.8 (1.09)	24.1 (0.95)	28.0 (1.10)	31.7 (1.25)	33.4 (1.31)	56.7 (2.23)	77.5 (3.05)	59.8 (2.35)	54.2 (2.13)	48.1 (1.89)	34.8 (1.37)	27.8 (1.09)	503.9 (19.81)
Average precipitation days	20.1	17.2	19.2	16.5	18.9	16.0	15.8	17.5	17.3	18.3	19.0	20.5	216.3
Average relative humidity (%)	86.7	83.9	81.4	76.4	74.8	71.2	76.9	82.4	84.2	88.9	89.4	86.9	81.9
Mean monthly sunshine hours	0.0	50.4	127.1	180.0	170.5	234.0	232.5	151.9	105.0	58.9	6.0	0.0	1,316.3
Source: http://climatebase.ru/station/22127/?lang=en
