= Ponoy =

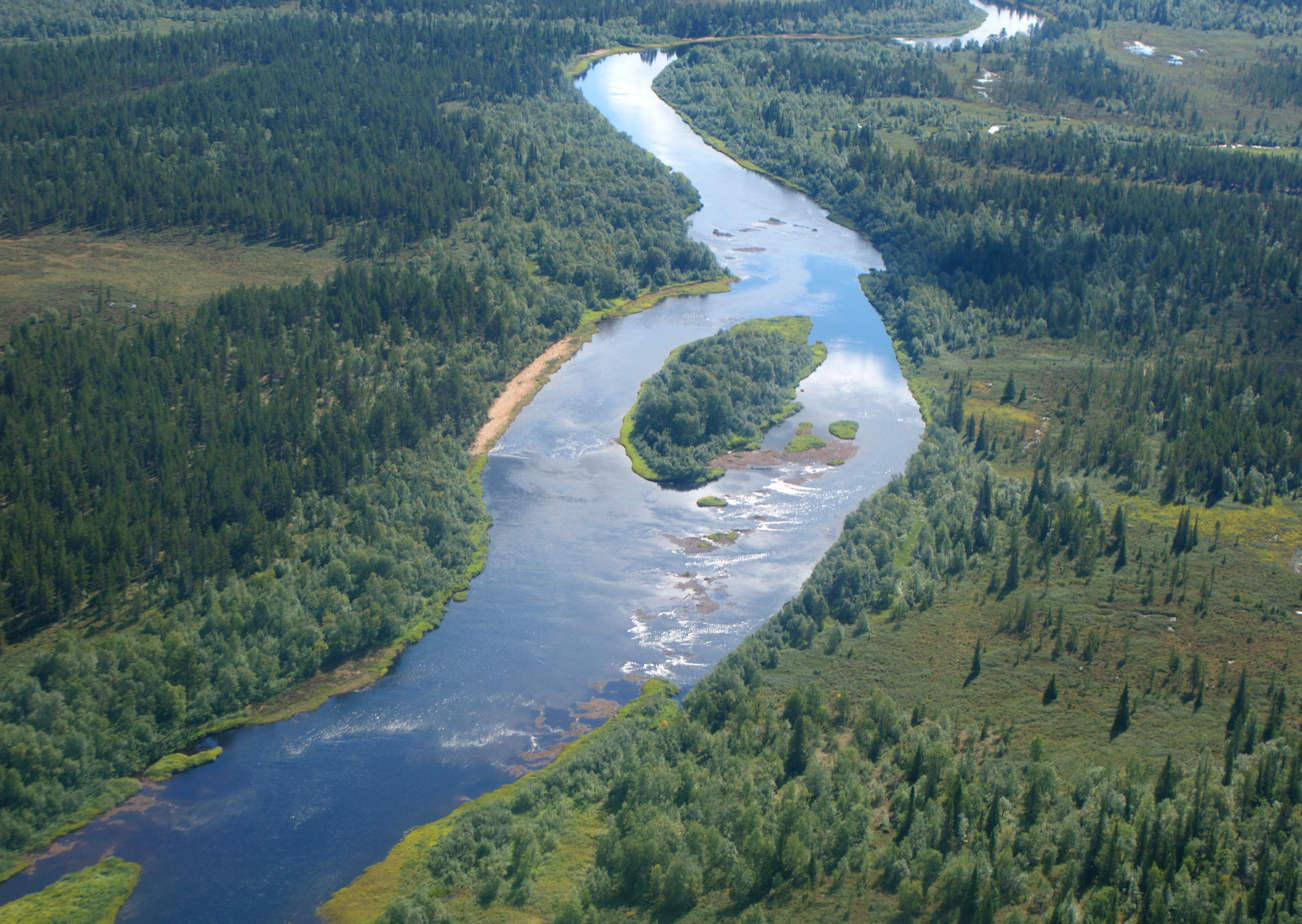

Location
- Country: Russia
- Region: Murmansk Oblast

Physical characteristics
- Source
  - location: Keivy Uplands
- Mouth: White Sea
  - location: Cape Korabelniy
  - coordinates: 66.98°N 41.2789°E
- Length: 426 km (265 mi)
- Basin size: 15,500 km^{2} (6,000 sq mi)

Basin features
- Tributaries
  - left: Purnach
  - right: Acheryok

The Ponoy (Russian: Поно́й) is a river on the Kola Peninsula in Russia. It is 426 km in length. The area of its basin is 15,500 km^{2}.

== Geography ==
The Ponoy's source lies in the western end of the Keivy Uplands, 50 km east of Lake Lovozero, in the middle of the Kola Peninsula. The river then flows towards the east, threading a winding path through a landscape of hilly and marshy taiga for most of its course. The Ponoy receives several tributaries from the north, the largest being the Acheryok. Like the Ponoy itself, these also has their sources in the Keivy Uplands.

Below its confluence with the Purnach, 77 km from the sea, the river changes character and flows down a steep-sided, canyon-like valley with many rapids. It finally flows into the White Sea at Cape Korabelny, at the eastern end of the Kola Peninsula.

The river freezes over in late October to early November, and stays frozen until the first half of May. It is located entirely within the Arctic Circle.

== Wildlife and fish ==
The river is very rich in Atlantic salmon (Salmo salar). It has become very popular among European fishing tourists, and there are fishing camps along the river.
