= Ostrovnoy, Murmansk Oblast =

Closed town in Murmansk Oblast, Russia

Ostrovnoy Островной
- Town
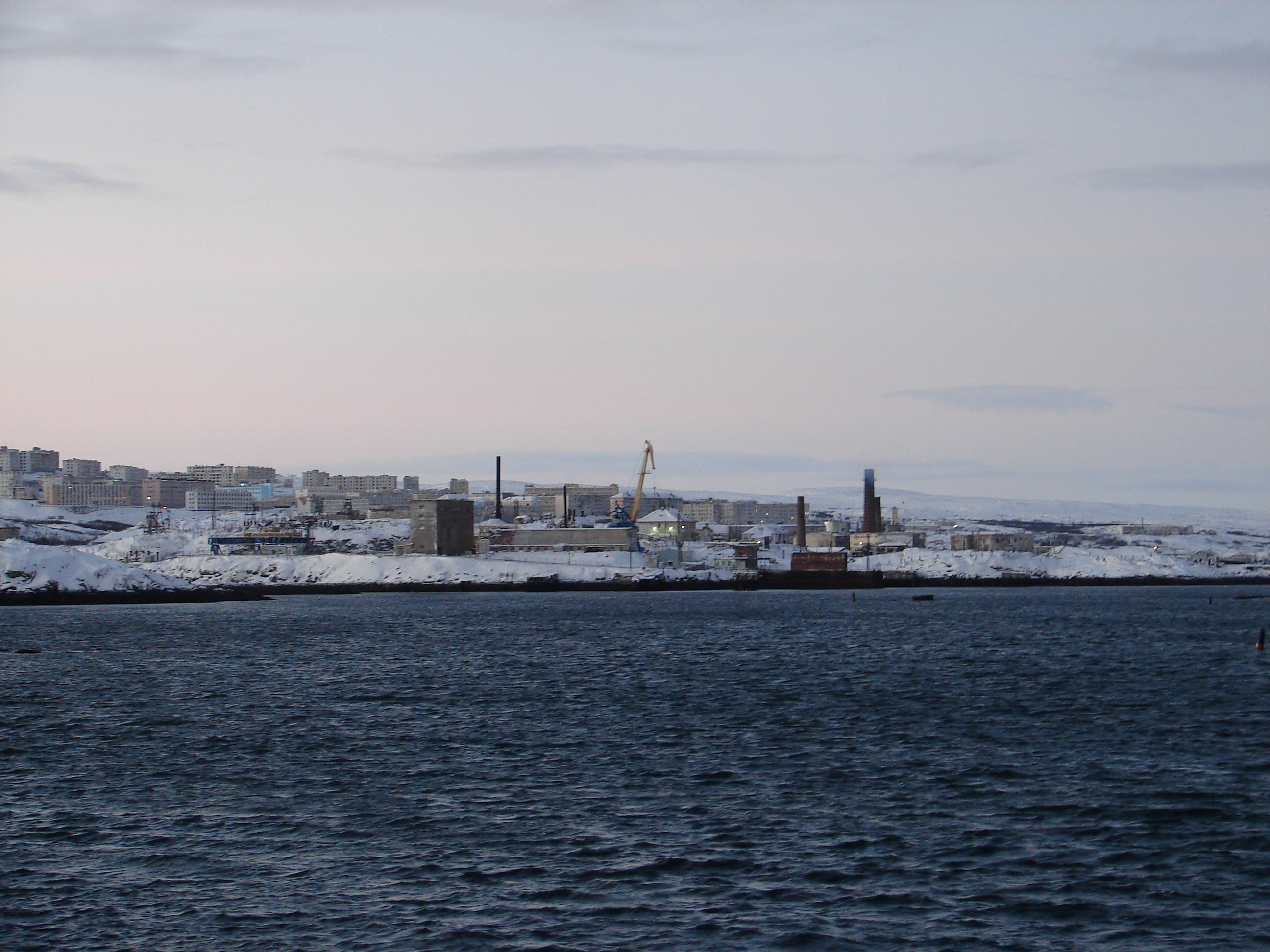
- View of Ostrovnoy

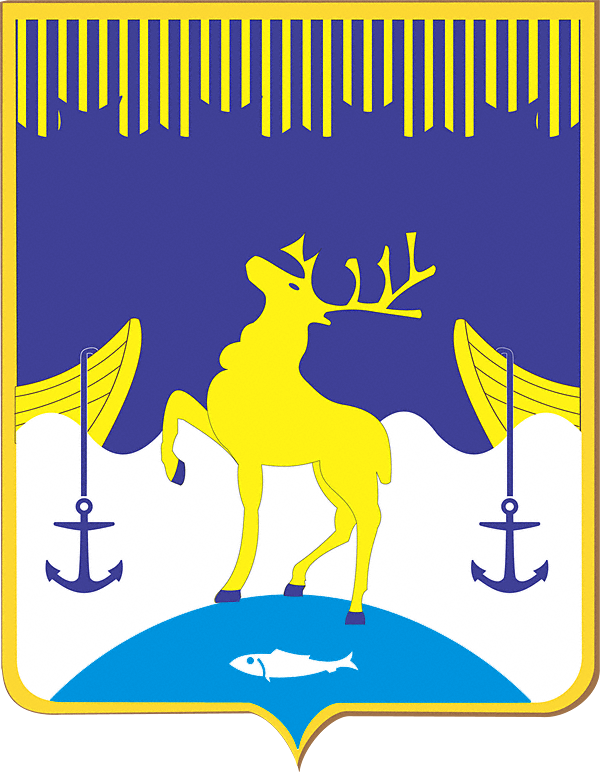
- Coat of arms
- Interactive map of Ostrovnoy
- Location of Ostrovnoy Ostrovnoy (Murmansk Oblast)
- Coordinates: 68°03′N 39°30′E
- Country: Russia
- Federal subject: Murmansk Oblast
- Founded: 1981

Government
  - Mayor: Gennady Chistopashin
- Elevation: 10 m (33 ft)

Population (2010 Census)
  - Total: 2,171
  - Estimate (2025): 1,225 (−43.6%)

Administrative status
  - Subordinated to: closed administrative-territorial formation of Ostrovnoy
  - Capital of: closed administrative-territorial formation of Ostrovnoy

Municipal status
  - Urban okrug: Ostrovnoy Urban Okrug
  - Capital of: Ostrovnoy Urban Okrug
- Time zone: UTC+3 (MSK)
- Postal code: 184640
- Dialing code: +7 81558
- OKTMO ID: 47731000001
- Website: www.zato-ostrov.ru

Ostrovnoy (Russian: Островно́й), previously known as Murmansk-140 (Му́рманск-140), is a closed town in Murmansk Oblast, Russia. As of the 2010 Census, its population was 2,171; down from 5,032 recorded in the 2002 Census.

== History ==
The first naval base was established here in 1915. There is no rail link to Ostrovnoy and the settlement is reachable by coastal ship, helicopter or small plane in winter.

Until 1938, the town was known as Yokanga. Until 1981, the town was known as Gremikha.

The Gremikha Naval Base was one of the Northern Fleet's main facilities for servicing nuclear submarines.

== Administrative and municipal status ==
Within the framework of administrative divisions, it is, together with six rural localities, incorporated as the closed administrative-territorial formation of Ostrovnoy—an administrative unit with the status equal to that of the districts. As a municipal division, the closed administrative-territorial formation of Ostrovnoy is incorporated as Ostrovnoy Urban Okrug. Aside from the town of Ostrovnoy, the municipality includes the settlements of Korabelnoye, Lumbovka, Mayak Gorodetsky, Mys-Chyorny, Svyatoy Nos and Tersko-Orlovsky Mayak. The settlement of Drozdovka was abolished in 2013.
