= Sammallahti =

Sammallahti is a Finnish surname. Notable people with the surname include:

- Heikki Sammallahti (1886–1954), gymnast
- Pekka Sammallahti (born 1947), professor of Sámi languages
- Pentti Sammallahti (born 1950), Finnish photographer, brother of Pekka
