= Kerttu Vuolab =

Finnish Sámi author, illustrator, translator and songwriter

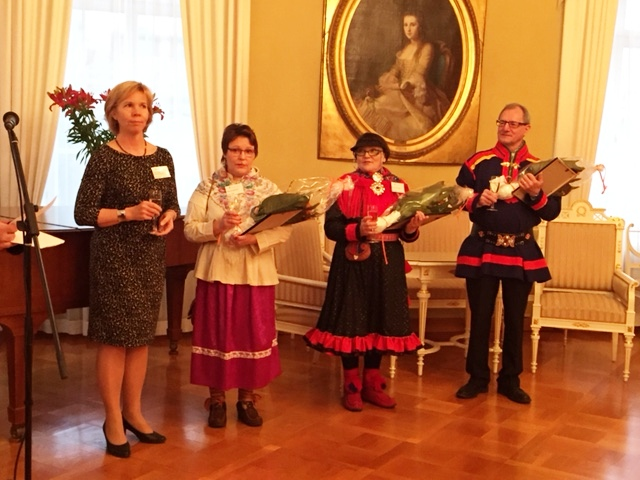
- Born: May 1, 1951 (age 74) Utsjoki, Finland
- Occupation: Author, illustrator, translator, songwriter
- Language: Northern Sámi
- Notable awards: First Class Knight of the White Rose of Finland (2006); Gollegiella (2014)

Kerttu Maarit Kirsti Vuolab (May 1, 1951 Utsjoki, Finland) is a Finnish Sámi author, illustrator, translator and songwriter, who has made it her life mission to ensure that the Sámi oral tradition, language and culture are passed on to future generations of Sámi through multiple media types. Her works have been translated into other Sámi languages such as Inari and Skolt Sámi as well as non-Sámi languages such as Swedish, Finnish, and English.

== Biography ==
=== Early life ===
Kerttu Vuolab was born on May 1, 1951, in the village of Outakoski to Nils Ola Vuolab and Kristiina Kitti. She grew up on the Finnish side of the border in the Teno River Valley where she still lives today.

== Awards ==
In 1983, Vuolab won an award from the Sami Writers' Association (SGS) recognizing her contribution to children's literature in Sámi. The same year, she won another award for the same reason from the Finnish Reading Association (FinRa). From January 1, 1994, to December 31, 1998, Vuolab served as artist laureate of the Province of Lapland. On December 6, 2006, Vuolab was awarded the First Class Knight of the White Rose of Finland. In 2011, she was nominated for the Nordic Council Literature Prize for her novel Bárbmoáirras. In 2014, Vuolab won the pan-Nordic Sami language award Gollegiella along with Mikael Svonni and Seija Sivertsen in recognition and appreciation of her contributions to Northern Sámi literature.

== Bibliography ==
=== Books, pamphlets and articles ===
- Golbma skihpáračča (1979, republished in 1989, with translations into Inari Sámi and Skolt Sámi also in 1989)
- Ánde ja Risten jagi fárus (1990)
- Sámegiella, skuvlagiella. Saamenkieli, koulukieli (1990)
- Snellman. Puhu omaa kieltäsi lapsellesi/ Hála mánnásat iezat eatnigiela (1993)
- Čeppári čáráhus (1994: a novel for young adults)
- Čomisteaddjit (2005: written together with Sverre Porsanger)
- Sámi – Saamelaiset – Les sames (2007)
- Bárbmoáirras (2008)

==== Audiobooks and sound recordings ====
- Ánde ja Risten jagi fárus (1990)
- Bárbmoáirras (2009)

=== Anthologies ===
- Cafe Boddu 2: Essayčoakkáldat (1995)
- Kukapa se sinäkin olet?/ Giibat don leat? Artikkelikokoelma (2000)
- Juoga mii geasuha. Sámi Girječálliid searvvi antologiija (2001)
- Whispering Treasures: an anthology (2012)

=== Translations ===
==== Books ====
- Antoine de Saint-Exupéry: Bás prinssaš (1981) (The Little Prince)
- Tove Jansson: Mo son de geavvá? (2000) (The Book about Moomin, Mymble and Little My)
- Iraida Vinogradova: Buhtes gáldut : diktacoakkáldat = Чӣллк Кāйв: Ēнн ōллма гуйкэ стиха кнӣга (2003), translated together with Leif Rantala

==== Videos ====
- Selma Lagerlöf: Lottežan Niillasa mátkkit 1-2 : Ruoktoháldi : Luođu čuotnjágat (1999) (The Wonderful Adventures of Nils)
- Selma Lagerlöf: Lottežan Niillasa mátkkit 3-4 : Smirre-rieban : Oarri čivggat (1999) (The Wonderful Adventures of Nils)
- Selma Lagerlöf: Lottežan Niillasa mátkkit 5-6 : Vittskövle ladni : Luođu čuotnjágiid gilvvut (1999) (The Wonderful Adventures of Nils)
- Tove Jansson: Mo son de geavvá? (1993)

== Discography ==
Vuolab has written the words for the following songs for Mari Boine:

- Eadnán bákti (To Woman, lit. the Rock of My Mother) on Gula gula (1989)
- Skádja (The Reverberation) on Goaskinviellja (1993) and on Eallin (1996)
- Ipmiliin hálešteapmi (Conversation With God) on Čuovgga Áirras (2009)
- Čuovgga Áirras - Sterna Paradisea on Čuovgga Áirras (2009)

=== Translations ===
Vuolab has also translated the following song's words for Eero Magga:

- Idjastállu (together with Siiri Miettinen. Translation of Tapio Rautavaara’s Sininen Uni)

== Sources ==
- Helander, Elina; Kailo, Kaarina, eds. (1998). No Beginning, No End: The Sami Speak Up. Circumpolar Research Series. Vol. 5. [Edmonton]: Canadian Circumpolar Institute. pp. 103–110. ISBN 1-896445-09-8.
- Hirvonen, Vuokko (1999). Saamenmaan ääniä: saamelaisen naisen tie kirjailijaksi - Sámeeatnama jienat: sápmelaš nissona bálggis girječállin [The voices of Sápmi: the Sámi woman's road to becoming a writer]. Suomalaisen Kirjallisuuden Seuran toimituksia (in Finnish and Northern Sami). Vol. 725. Helsinki: Suomalaisen Kirjallisuuden Seura. ISBN 951-746-087-2.
