= Aleksandra Antonova (writer) =

Russian Sámi teacher, writer, poet, translator (1932–2014)

Aleksandra Andreevna Antonova
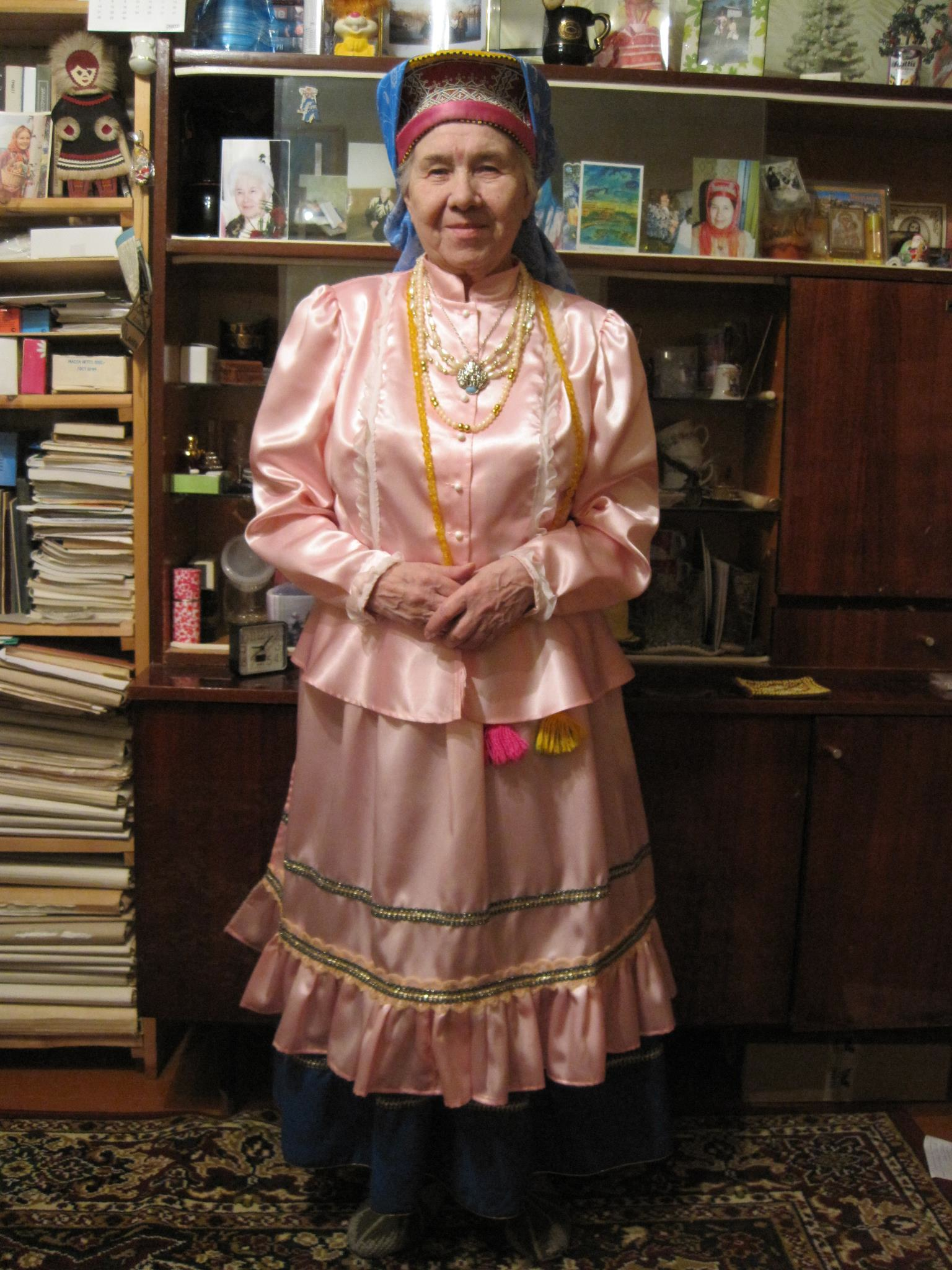
- Aleksandra Andreevna Antonova (2012)
- Born: 5 May 1932; Kola, Russian SFSR, Soviet Union
- Died: 8 October 2014 (aged 82); Lovozero, Russia
- Education: State Educational Herzen Institute
- Occupations: Kildin Sámi teacher; Writer; Poet; Translator

Aleksandra Andreevna Antonova (Kildin Sami: Са̄нндрэ Антонова; Northern Sami: Sandra Antonova; 5 May 1932 – 8 October 2014) was a Russian–Kildin Sámi teacher, writer, poet and translator. Antonova, who was an active Kildin Sámi language practitioner, participated in the work of preparing the official Kildin Sámi written language, which has been used since the 1980s. She was the author of several Kildin Sámi textbooks and fiction books in Kildin Sámi and Russian. In 2012, she was awarded the Gollegiella Prize together with Nina Afanasyeva.

== Biography ==
Aleksandra Andreevna Antonova was born in the Kola town of Teriberka in Murmansk Oblast on 5 May 1932. In 1956, she graduated as a teacher in Russian and literature at the State Educational Herzen Institute (now Herzen University) in Leningrad.

After completing her education, Antonova returned to the Kola Peninsula and worked as a teacher at the boarding school in Lovozero from 1956 until retirement.

In 1976, a working group for planning the Sami language was established within the education section of the Central Committee of the Communist Party in the Murman area. Under the guidance of the educator and linguist Rimma Kuruch, the Sami-speaking teacher, Antonova, and the pedagogue, Boris Gluhov from Murmansk, began to prepare a new orthography and new teaching material for the Kola-Sami. Together with linguists from the Russian Academy of Sciences, Antonova and her colleagues revised the orthography, which has not been used since 1937, and developed a new scriptural standard. In 1979, this new Cyrillic orthography was first presented and used in experimental language courses. She then began using the new language norm in her Kildin Sámi teaching for pupils at the boarding school and began writing the first Kildin Sámi textbook that came out in 1982. In 1985, the working group in Murmansk, which had grown with several new Sami employees, published a comprehensive Kildin Sámi-Russian dictionary. The authors of the dictionary were Antonova, Nina Afanasyeva, and several others. Georgij K. Kert's Kildin Sámi-Russian-Kildin Sámi dictionary from 1986 was developed with the assistance of Antonova as a native speaker consultant.

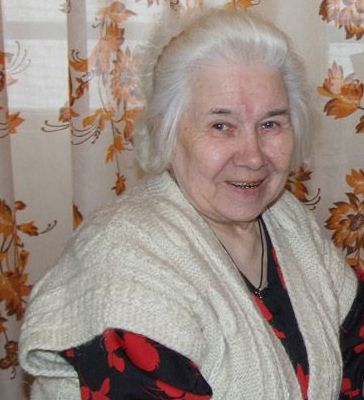
A.A. Antonova (2008)

From 1993–2007, Antonova worked as editor and radio speaker for the Sami radio broadcasts by the municipal radio in Lovozero. She also gave a radio course in Kildin Sámi. In addition to her work as a teacher and language activist, Antonova was also a prolific writer who wrote several collections of poems for children and adults in both Kildin Sámi and Russian. She also translated literature from Kildin Sámi to Russian, and from Russian to Kildin Sámi. Antonova's best-known translation is Astrid Lindgren's three books about Pippi Longstocking, which came out in a collections in Kildin Sámi in 2013. In addition to fiction, she also translated church literature. Antonova also worked as a proofreader and translator for source texts and as an informant for language documentation projects.

Antonova died on 8 October 2014 in Lovozero.

== Awards ==
- 2012, International Sami Language Award Gollegiella (together with Nina Afanasyeva)

== Selected works ==
Textbooks

- 1982, Са̄мь букварь. Leningrad.
- 2004, А̄й са̄ннҍ. Букварь. Длячебник для 1 класса саамских школ. Saint Petersburg.

Dictionaries

- 1985, Саамско-русский словарь. Murmansk (together with Nina E. Afanasheva, Rimma D. Kuruch, Ekaterina I. Metjkina, Lasar D. Jakovlev, Boris A. Gluhov).
- 2014, Са̄мь-Рӯшш са̄ннҍнэххьк, 7500 ве̄ррьт са̄мь са̄ннӭ я 10600 са̄ррнмушшэ. Мурманск.
- 2021, Саамско-Русский и Русско-саамский словарь (около 16000 слов). Университет Тромсё – Арктический университет Норвегии.(together with Elisabeth Scheller).

Bible translation

- 1996, Ӣсус - па̄ррнэ ка̄ннҍц (анвангелий для детей «Иисус - друг детей»). Stockholm.

Fiction

- 2004, Пӣрас: стӣха кыррьй паррнэ гуэйкэ, Bearaš: monthly dictation. Karasjohka.
- 2007, Струны сердца. Murmansk.

Fiction translations

- 1996, Виллькесь пуаз (повесть Бажанова А. А. «Белый олень»). Karasjohka.
- 2003, Ка̄йне ла̄йххь (сказки Большаковой Н. П. «Подарок чайки»). Murmansk.
- 2007, Вӣллькесь пуаз (перевод стихов Матрехина И. Я. "Белый олень"). Murmansk (together with Anfisa M. Ageeva).
- 2008, Сергей Есенин на саамском. Стихотворения. Murmansk (together with Sofija E. Jakimovich).
- 2013, Та̄рьенч Кукесьсуххк (сборник трёх произведений Астрид Линдгрен про Пеппи Длинныйчулок: «Пеппи поселяется на вилле Курица», «Пеппи отправляется в путь», «Пеппи в стране Веселии»). Мурманск.
