= Henrik Barruk =

Ume Sámi language consultant and teacher

- Born: Lars Henrik Andreas Barruk; February 26, 1961 (age 65); Västerås, Sweden
- Occupations: Sámi language teacher and consultant
- Known for: Ume Sámi language revitalization

Lars Henrik Andreas Barruk (born 26 February 1961) is a Sámi language consultant and teacher known for his work documenting and revitalizing the Ume Sámi language.

Barruk is one of the few academics working with Ume Sámi, and he has taught courses on the language at Umeå University. He served on a Saami Council working group to develop an Ume Sami orthography together with the linguists Ole Henrik Magga, Pekka Sammallahti, and Olavi Korhonen; and he worked with older Ume Sámi speakers on a 4,300-word Ume Sámi dictionary.

In 2008, Barruk was awarded the Såhkie Umeå Sami Association's Hederspris and the pan-Nordic Gollegiella Prize for his work with Ume Sámi. In 2018 he was also awarded the Swedish Language Council's Minority Language Prize for his efforts to save Ume Sami.

Barruk is the father of the musician Katarina Barruk who writes music in Ume Sami and works as an Ume Sámi language-immersion teacher.
