= Teriberka (river) =

River in the country of Russia

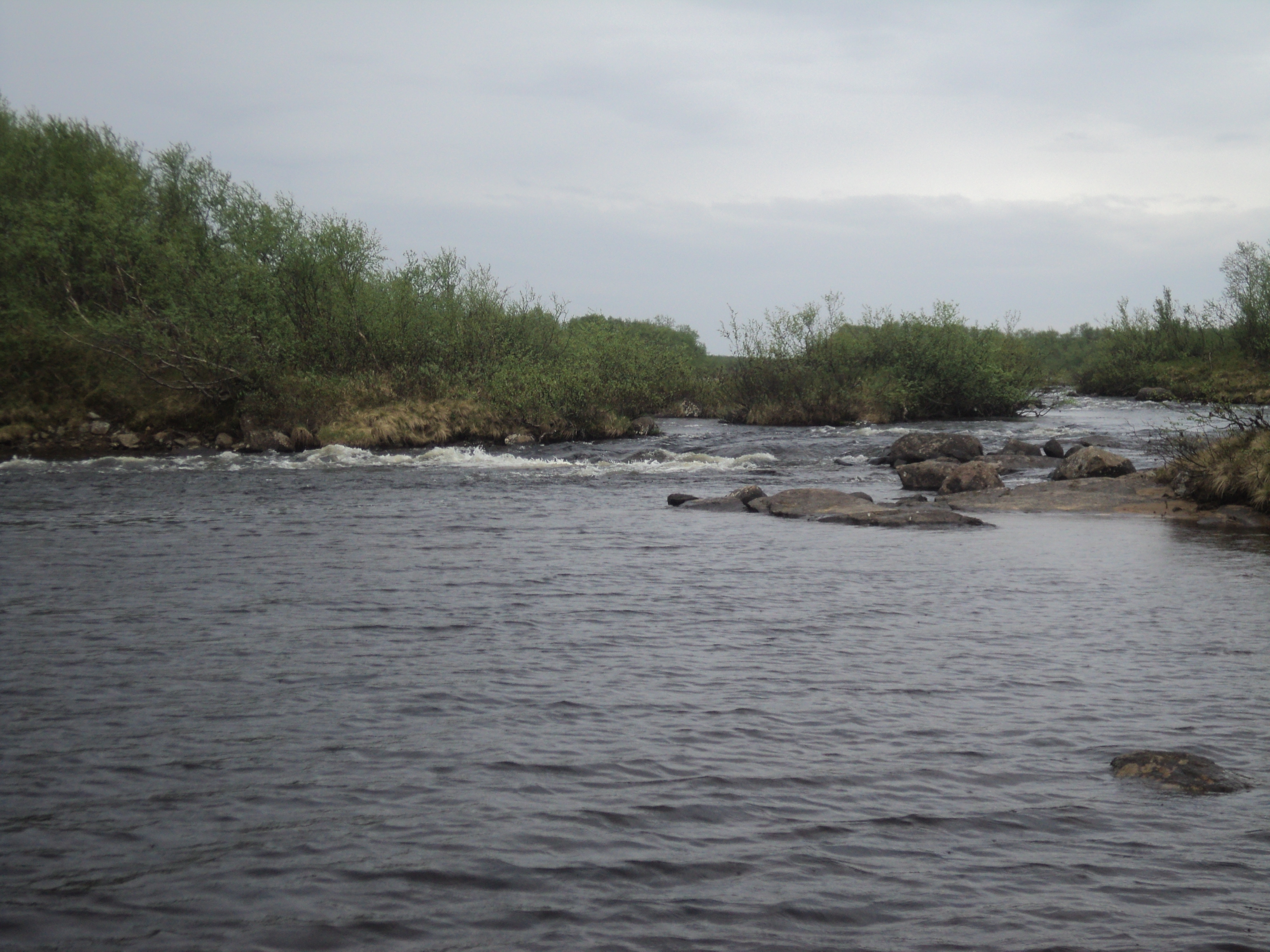

Location
- Country: Russia

Physical characteristics
- Source
  - location: Murmansk Oblast
- Mouth: Barents Sea
  - coordinates: 69.1695°N 35.1288°E
- Length: 127 km (79 mi)
- Basin size: 2,230 km^{2} (860 sq mi)

Teriberka River (Russian: Териберка; Kildin Sami: Тырьбэрь) is a river in the north of the Kola Peninsula in Murmansk Oblast, Russia. It flows into the Barents Sea about 50 km east of Murmansk. It is 127 kilometres (79 mi) long, and has a drainage basin of 2,230 square kilometres (860 sq mi).

There are two hydroelectric power stations on the Teriberka River, with a total capacity of 157 MW and an annual production of 290 GWh. The village of Teriberka is located at its mouth.
