= Jelena Porsanger =

Russian-born Norwegian Sami ethnographer and university rector

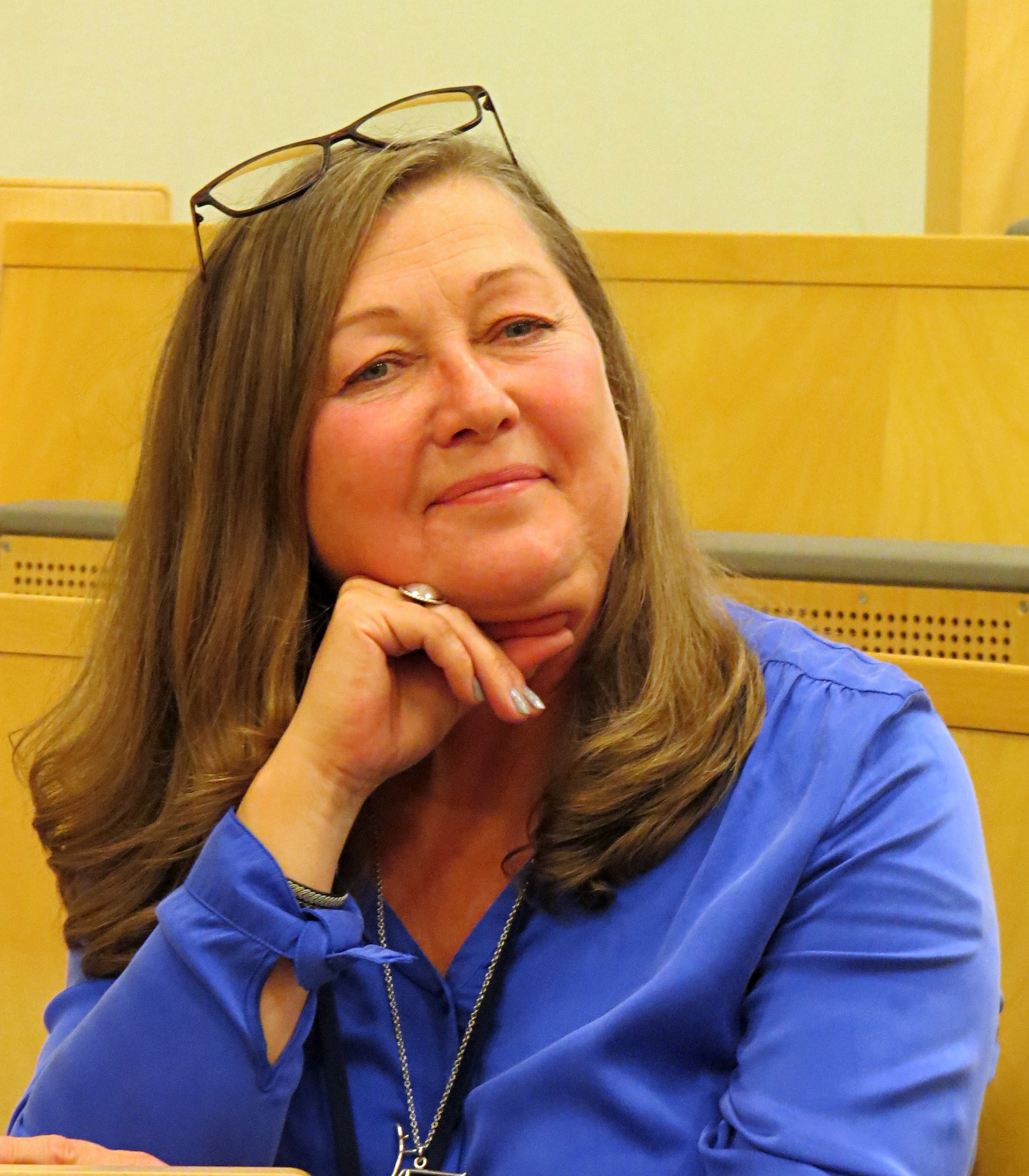
- Jelena Porsanger at the Árran conference in 2019
- Born: 1967; Loparskaya, Soviet Union
- Occupation: ethnographer

Jelena Porsanger (born 1967) is a Russian-born Norwegian Sami ethnographer who researches Sami culture and history. From 2011 to 2015, she was the rector of the Sámi University of Applied Sciences in Kautokeino, Norway.

== Early life and education ==
Jelena Sergeyevna Semyjashkina was born in Loparskaya, Soviet Union in 1967, the same rural locality she grew up in on the Kola Peninsula, in the Kildin Saami area. However, her family background is from the Skolt Sami area near the border between Russia and Finland, and her father must have spoken Skolt Sami. Her parents were researchers of the Northern Lights at the Arctic and Antarctic Research Institute, Kola Science Centre under the Russian Academy of Sciences, and therefore, Porsanger was influenced at an early age to develop an academic career.

In the Soviet Union, the ideal of equality was so strong that cultural background was destroyed, and teaching in Sami had been banned since the 1930s. However, during the 1970s, there was growing interest in Sami, and when a Sami-Russian dictionary was developed, Porsanger learned Sami on her own. She also learned Finnish from her grandmother and later went to Helsinki to study, where she also learned Northern Sami.

== Career ==
In 1998, Porsanger began working as an associate professor at the Center for Sami Studies at the University of Tromsø. In 2000, she was promoted to researcher and lecturer, and in 2005, became a senior researcher. Her research on oral and written sources of the Eastern Sami indigenous religion from the 16th to the 20th centuries led to her doctoral dissertation, "Bassejoga čáhci": Gáldut nuortasámiid eamioskkoldaga birra álgoálbmotmetodologiijaid olis (Indigenous Methodology), which she defended at the University of Tromsø in January 2006. It was the first public defense to have taken place in a Sami language in Norway. Porsanger has said that the inspiration for the assignment came from being frustrated at how little has been written about the Eastern Sami culture and religion, and that what was written was "unjustly generalized".

Porsanger's research interests include the decolonization of research, the design of indigenous methodology, research ethics, Sami research history, and the history and spiritual culture of the Eastern Sami. She was subsequently employed at the Sámi University of Applied Sciences in Kautokeino, where, since 2010, she has led a research project for the development of methodology, documentation, preservation, protection and storage of Årbediehtu (traditional Sami knowledge). On August 1, 2011, she became rector at the college, a position she held until 2015. Porsanger has also been a member of the panel of experts for the United Nations Permanent Forum on Indigenous Issues.
