= Gollegiella =

Pan-nordic Sami language award

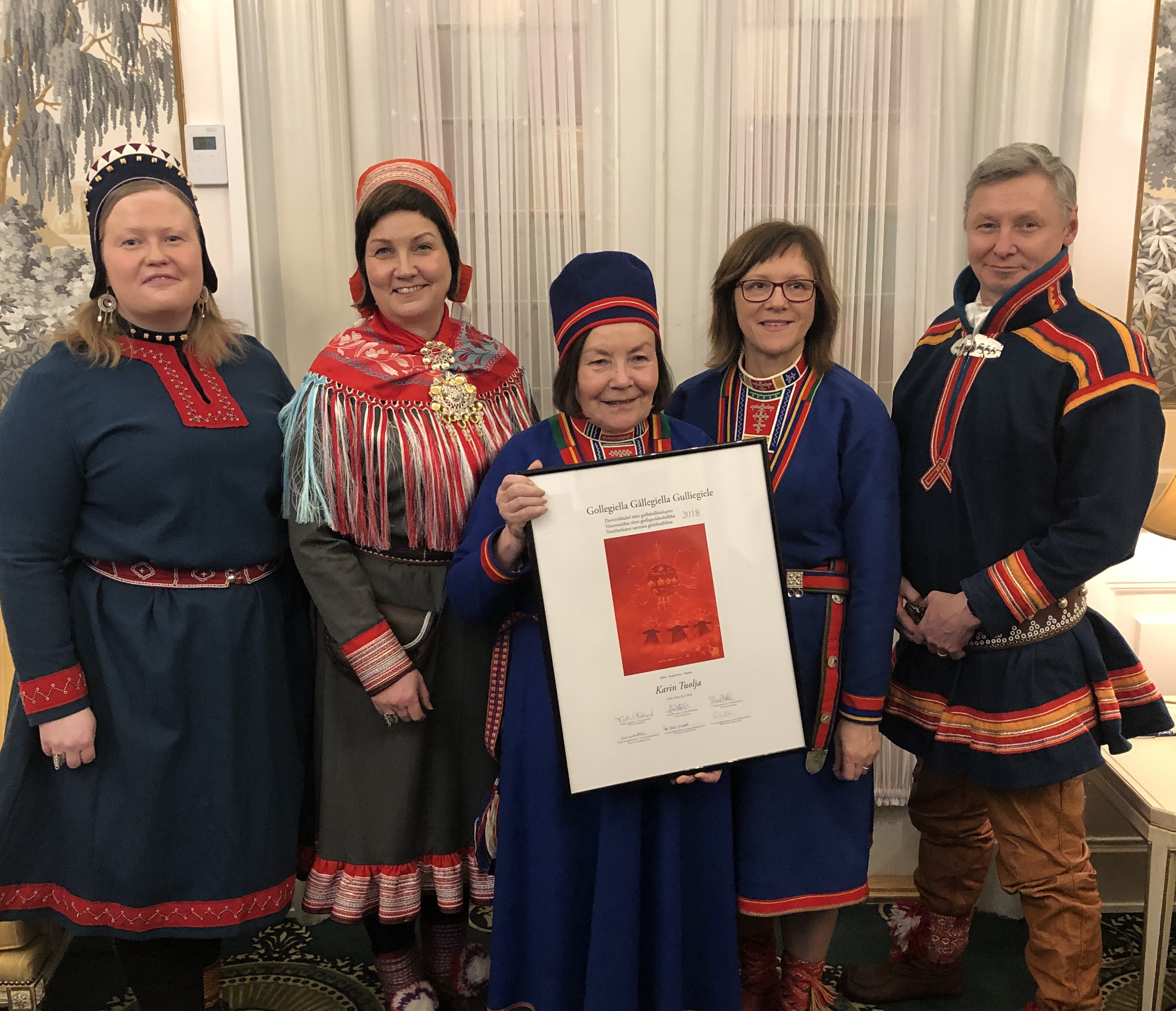
From left to right: President of the Sami Parliament of Finland Tiina Sanila-Aikio, President of the Sami Parliament of Norway Aili Keskitalo, the Lule Saami winner of the Gollegiella Award 2018 Karin Tuolja, jury member Solvår Knutsen Turi, and President of the Sami Parliament of Sweden Per-Olof Nutti.

Gollegiella (Northern Sámi for "golden language", Southern Sami: Gulliegïele, Lule Sami: Gållegiella, Inari Sami: Kollekielâ, and Skolt Sami: Kåʹllǩiõll) is a pan-Nordic Sámi language award founded in 2004 by the ministers for Sámi affairs and the presidents of the Sámi Parliaments in Norway, Sweden, and Finland with the aim of promoting, developing and preserving the Sámi languages. The biennial award comes with a monetary prize that is currently 15,000 euros.

Individuals and institutions in Norway, Sweden, Finland, and Russia can nominate candidates. The award can be won by people, groups, organizations, and institutions individually or collectively.

== Recipients ==
- 2004: Ella Holm Bull and Anarâškielâ servi
- 2006: Harald Gaski and Jouni Moshnikoff
- 2008: Sami Siida in Utsjoki and Henrik Barruk
- 2010: Máret Sárá and Lajla Mattsson Magga
- 2012: Aleksandra Antonova and Nina Afanasyeva; Divvun and Giellatekno
- 2014: Mikael Svonni, Kerttu Vuolab, and Seija Sivertsen
- 2016: Kirsi Paltto, Jan Skoglund Paltto, Ingá-Márja Steinfjell, and Máret Steinfjell
- 2018: Karin Tuolja (Jokkmokk) and Jekaterina Mechkina (Murmansk)
- 2020: Ellen Pautamo and Jonar Thomasson
- 2022: Ole Henrik Magga
- 2024: Sig-Britt Persson ja Pekka Sammallahti
- 2026: Nils Øivind Helander
