= Ella Holm Bull =

Ella Holm Bull, (néé Joma or Jåma; 12 October 1929 – 21 September 2006) was a Southern Sámi teacher and author, dedicated to promoting the Southern Sami language for many years. Together with Knut Bergsland, she created an orthography for Southern Sámi in 1974, which is called the Bergsland-Bull orthography in their honor. Holm Bull received numerous awards for her work on Southern Sámi, including the first-ever Gollegiella Award in 2004.

== Works ==
=== Literary ===
- Manne joe maahtam lohkedh. 1989
- Åarjel-saemien Gåalmede gærja. 1987
- Åarjel-saemien Vijhtede gærja. 1986
- Åarjel-saemien Nubpie gærja. 1986
- Åarjel-saemien Nealjede gærja. 1986
- Ovmese veareldh. 1985
- Suhtjegh. 1984
- Tsååbpe-niejlen jih Tsååbpe-baernien bijre. 1984
- Brorke. 1984
- Åarjel-saemien Voestes gærja. 1982
- Lohkede Saemien (with Knut Bergsland). 1974

=== Musical ===
She published two LPs on the Iđut label:

- Jåvle-Laavlomh (1996). ISBN 82-7601-023-7. (Christmas songs)
- Laavlomh-Maanide (1997). ISBN 82-7601-038-5. (Children's songs, recorded with assistance from Frode Fjellheim)

== Awards ==
- The first Nordic Sámi Language Prize, Gollegiella in 2004.
- The first Nord-Trøndelag County Culture Award in 1982.
- The Saami Council's Annual Prize in 1996
- Translator's Award for Children's and Young Adult Literature from the Norwegian Ministry of Culture and Church Affairs in 1976 for her translation of the picture book Jakob og Joakim to Southern Sámi.
