= Georgy Martynovitch Kert =

Russian linguist

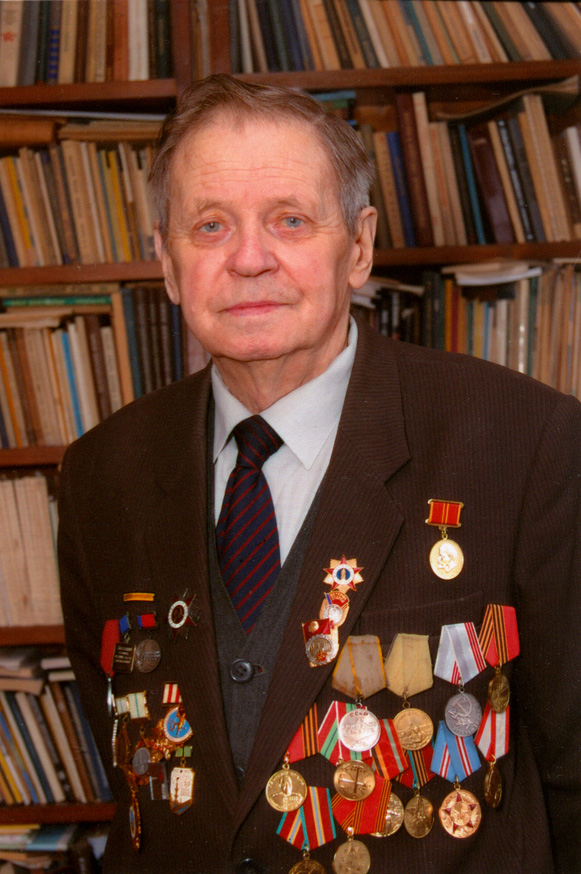
- Georgy Martynovitch Kert in 2005
- Born: 1 February 1923; Village Kamenka, Lomonosovsky District, Leningrad Oblast, Soviet Union
- Died: 26 September 2009 (aged 86); Petrozavodsk
- Education: Saint Petersburg State University
- Scientific career
- Fields: Linguistics, Kildin Sami language

Georgy Martynovitch Kert (Russian: Георгий Мартынович Керт; 1 February 1923 – 26 September 2009, in Petrozavodsk) was a Russian linguist and Kildin Sámi specialist. In addition to a reference grammar on Kildin Sámi written in 1971, and two collections of texts from 1961 and 1988 written together with V. Z. Panfilov and P. M. Zajkov, Kert has also worked with naming questions. Kert has worked at the Institute for Language, Literature and History at the Karelian branch of the Russian Academy of Sciences in Petrozavodsk.

== Bibliography ==
- Kert, G. M. (1960): Основные сходства и различия в саамских диалектах кольского полыострова. Москва: Издатльство академии наук.
- Kert, G. M. (1961): Образцы саамской речи: Materialy po jazyku i fol'kloru saamov Kol'skogo Poluostrova (kil'dinskij i iokan'gskij dialekty) Москва-Ленинград: Наука.
- Kert, G. M. (1971): Саамский язык (Кильдинский диалект): фонетика - морфология -синтаксис Академия наук СССР, Карельский филиал, Институт языка, литературы и истории. Ленинград: Наука.
- Panfilov, V. Z., G. M. Kert, and P. M. Zajkov. (1988): Образцы саамской речи, Петрозаводск: Карельский филиал АН СССР.
- Kert, G. M. (1986): Словарь саамско-русский и русско-саамский. Ленинград: Просвещение.
