= Rimma Kuruch =

Russian linguist and politician (1938 – 2019)

- Римма Куруч
- Born: May 6, 1938; Balovo, Vachsky District, Gorky Oblast, USSR
- Died: July 8, 2019 (aged 81); Murmansk, Russia
- Citizenship: Russian
- Awards: Medal for Fidelity to the North

Academic background
- Education: Russian Academy of Education

Academic work
- Discipline: Linguistics
- Sub-discipline: Sámi languages
- Institutions: Murmansk Arctic State University

Rimma Dmitrievna Kuruch (Russian: Римма Дмитриевна Куруч, 6 May 1938 – 8 July 2019) was a specialist in language education. Much of her work focused on documenting, preserving, and encouraging the use of Kildin Sámi. Kuruch also helped form the Kola Sámi Association and served as its first co-vice president.

== Early life and education ==
Kuruch was born in the village of Balovo in Vachsky District, Gorky Oblast, Russia. Her parents were of Moldovan heritage. In 1961, she graduated from the Bălți State Pedagogical Institute in the Moldovan SSR with a degrees in Russian Language, Literature, and English and she began working as a teacher in rural schools in Moldova. In 1967, she completed graduate studies at the Russian Academy of Education and she began work at Chernivtsi State University in the Ukrainian SSR in 1968. She became a full professor there in 1971 and continued at the university until 1975.

== Sámi language work ==
In 1975, Kuruch relocated to Murmansk, where she joined Pedagogical Institute Murmansk (now the Murmansk Arctic State University) to work with the Institute of Linguistics of the USSR Academy of Sciences. There Kuruch participated as an editor and author in the project to create the first Sámi–Russian dictionary, Саамско–Русский Словарь/Са̄мь–Рӯшш Соагкнэһкь (published in 1985), which included 8,000 words, 400 proverbs and sayings, a sketch grammar, and extensive reference material.

In 1976, she became the head of a regional authors' group working to preserve and develop the Kildin Sámi language. The group developed the modern Cyrillic orthography for Kildin Sámi, along with curricula and resources for teaching Kildin Sámi to elementary schools. In 1995, Kuruch published with Nina Afanasyeva Правила орфографии и пунктуации саамского языка (Sámi Language Spelling and Punctuation Rules).

In 2010, she was honored by the Russian Association of Indigenous Peoples of the North with its Fidelity to the North medal for her decades of work to revive the Kildin Sámi language.

In 1989, she was elected as a co-vice president (alongside Nina Afanasyeva) of the Kola Sámi Association; however, she left the post after one year due to the association's requirement that officers be ethnic Sámi.

== Political engagement ==
Beyond her work with Sámi languages, Kuruch was an engaged activist in the Murmansk community. She worked with the Murmansk Regional Branch of the Russian Party of Pensioners for Social Justice from 1998 to 2006, serving as chair from 2002 to 2006. From 2008, she chaired the Murmansk Children of the Great Patriotic War organization and served on the organizing committee for the 70th anniversary celebrations marking the end of World War II and the defeat of Nazi troops in the Arctic.
