= Katarina Barruk =

Ume Sámi singer from Sweden

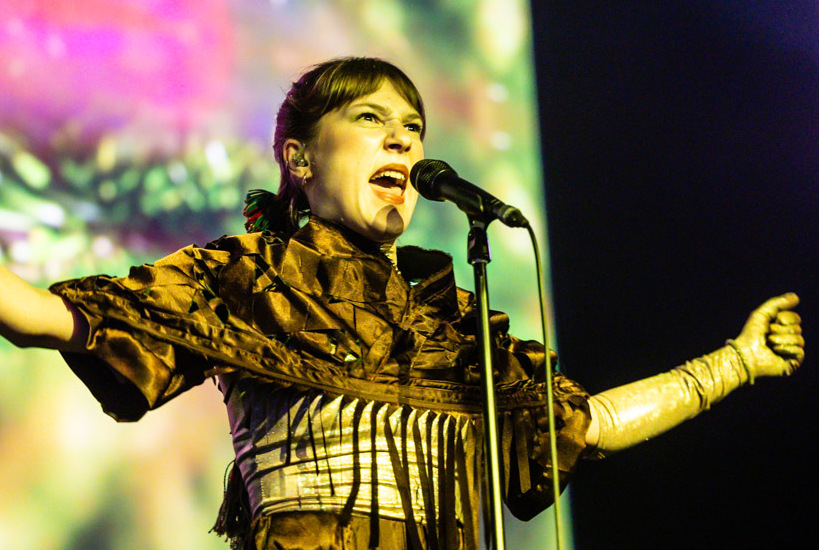
- Katarina Barruk performing at WOMEX Worldwide Music Expo in 2024
- Born: 5 December 1994 (age 31); Storuman, Sweden
- Occupations: Singer; Songwriter; Pianist

Elina Maria Katarina Barruk (born 5 December 1994) is a Swedish Ume Sámi singer, songwriter and pianist, who sings in the Ume Sámi language, now spoken by less than a dozen native speakers. She believes her songs will help to revitalize the language. In September 2015, she released her first album, Báruos, and continues to perform in concerts inspired by traditional yoik music from the province of Västerbotten. Her second album, Ruhttuo, was released in 2022. She performed in the 2025 BBC Proms at the Royal Albert Hall.

== Biography ==
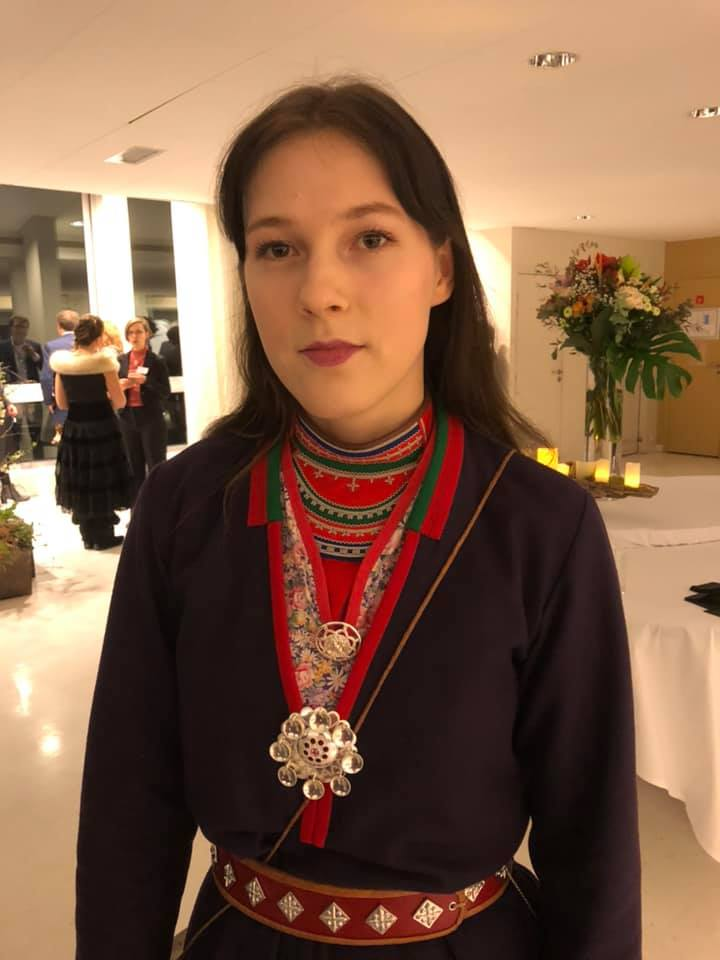
Barruk in 2019

Born on 5 December 1994 in Storuman, Elina Maria Katarina Barruk's mother plays the piano and her father, Henrik Barruk, yoiks and works on Sámi language preservation. Since early childhood, she aspired to become a musician herself. When she was 16, she moved to Umeå where she joined the music arts programme at Midgårdsskolan. There she formed a band with Elias Häreskog (bass), Mattias Nygren (percussion) and Emmy Westing (piano).

As Ume Sámi was spoken at home, she has also come to recognize the importance of helping the language to be used more widely. She wrote the songs for Báruos, her first album, in the Ume Sámi language. Working with the Norwegian yoiker Frode Fjellheim, she has developed tracks varying from yoik to indie pop and jazz. In addition to her involvement in music, Barruk works as a Sámi teacher in Umeå and Storuman. She also teaches at the Algguogåhtie Association which since 2009 has received substantial grants to support Ume Sámi.

== Career ==
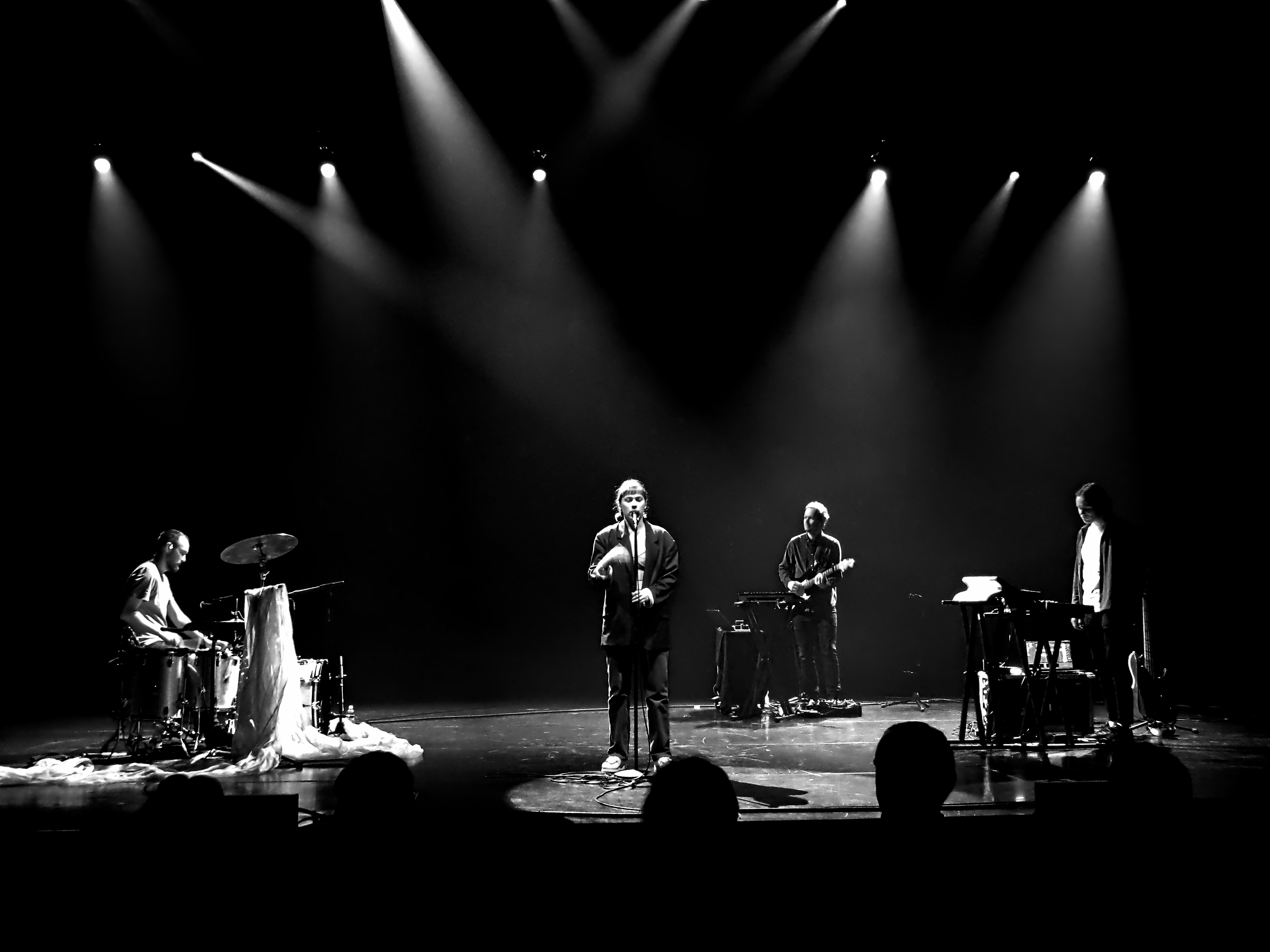
Barruk performing on stage at Sello Hall in 2023

In both 2016 and 2018, Barruk starred at Norway's Varanger Festival in Vadsø where she has many fans. Singing in Ume Sámi, she explained that only two members of her generation spoke the language, she and her brother.

In January 2019, she sang in Ume Sámi at UNESCO's launch of the International Year of Indigenous Languages.

In August 2025, Barruk performed at the Royal Albert Hall as part of the BBC Proms concert series, accompanied by the Norwegian Chamber Orchestra led by Pekka Kuusisto. She said of the event that "The Prom is a symbol of hope and defiance for Ume Sámi and its speakers".

== Reception ==
Ådne Evjen reviewed Ruhttuo on the Norwegian music site Disharmoni, awarding a rating of 5/6. In his view, the album shows the strength and clarity of Barruk's artistic expression. He finds the production beautiful, and the album successful in meeting Barruk's goal of having the audience dream in her musical landscape. Her voice, he writes, is strong and controlled, both in song and in yoik. He admires the acoustic guitar on "Vásstiedeh! (Speak Up!)", and calls "Niäguoh (Dreams)" beautifully dark and solid.

Carl Ahlström reviewed Báruos for the Swedish newspaper Västerbottens-Kuriren, calling it a strong debut album with "much soul and strength". He described its style as a blend of "low-key jazz, singer-songwriter pop and Finnish tango tones", with lyrics in Ume Sámi. He praised Barruk's "fantastic" vocals in songs such as Áhkán and Juohkádit, but felt that the low key of the album might fail to engage listeners.

== Awards ==
Barruk was honoured with the Young Artist of the Year award at the 2012 Riddu Riđđu Sámi festival. In 2013, she won the Youth Prize at Umeå's Sámi Week.

== Discography ==
=== Studio albums ===
- Báruos (2015)
- Ruhttuo (2022)

=== Singles ===
- "Dállie" (2022)
- "Jïmmatje" (2022)

=== Compilation appearances ===
- "Russuoh vuölieb" (2015), included on Stuorra várrie together with Marja Mortensson and also on Kustlandet

=== Collaborative albums ===
- Golbma jiena (2017), with Golbma Jiena (EP)
- Live In Bergen (2021), with Avant Joik

=== Other contributions ===
- "Nagirvárrái" (2021), with Ájmuoh / ilmmit (Worlds Within Us)
- "Dárrbuo" (2025), with Bicep (TAKKUUK)
