= Kildin Sámi =

Language spoken on the Kola Peninsula of northwestern Russia

- кӣллт са̄мь кӣлл kiillt saamʹ kiill
- Native to: Russia
- Region: Kola Peninsula (Murmansk Oblast)
- Native speakers: c. 341 (primarily Kildin) (2020 census)
- Language family: Uralic: Sámi; Eastern; Peninsula; Kildin Sámi
- Writing system: Cyrillic

Language codes
- ISO 639-3: sjd
- Glottolog: kild1236
- ELP: Kildin Saami
- Kildin Sami language area (red) within Sápmi (grey)

- Kildin Saami is classified as Severely Endangered by the UNESCO Atlas of the World's Languages in Danger (2010)

A Kildin Sámi speaker

Kildin Sámi, also spelt as Kildin Saami is a Sámi language spoken on the Kola Peninsula of northwestern Russia by the Kildin Sámi, who have historically inhabited the peninsula.

The Sámi languages closest to Kildin are Ter Sámi and Akkala Sámi, in Soviet tradition sometimes considered to be dialects of Kildin Sámi. From a strictly geographical point of view, only Kildin and Ter, spoken on the Peninsula, could be regarded as Kola Sámi. It is the largest of the Eastern Sámi languages by number of speakers. However, unlike its close relatives Skolt Sámi and Inari Sámi, Kildin Sámi is only used actively by very few people.

== Geographic distribution ==
Sámi dialects and settlements in Russia: Kildin (K-5 is Lovozero)

Originally, Kildin Sámi was spoken in clustered areas of the mainland and coastal parts of the Kola Peninsula. Nowadays, Kildin Sámi speakers can be found in rural and urban areas, including the administrative center of the oblast. The area of Lovozero has the highest concentration of speakers. Other Kildin Sámi speakers are scattered throughout the villages and small towns of the Peninsula: Revda, Kola, Loparskaya, Teriberka, but can also be found in larger more sizable towns of Murmansk Oblast such as Olenegorsk and Apatity. Lovozero is known as the main place where the language is still spoken by 700–800 ethnic Sámi amongst a total village population of approximately 3,000. However, today the Saami are but a minority in Lovozero: the large majority of the population consists of Russians and Izhma Komi. The language has only about 100 active and perhaps 600 passive speakers. As a result of relocation, migration, and forced movement of the group, the community has really fragmented and become divided over other areas in Murmansk Region, thus leading to an inability for the revival and sustenance of their language, traditions, customs, and beliefs.

== History ==
=== Early period ===
The Kildin Sámi (Kola Sámi) first came into contact and had more subsequent meetings with the Russians in the 12th century, when Pomor traders from the Republic of Novgorod landed on the southern shores of the Kola Peninsula. The Russians themselves inhabited and set up shelters in the Kola and the Ter Coast as it was known then during the 13th–14th centuries. During the 15th and 16th centuries, Russians started heavily occupying and building their own communities in northern Karelia and increased exposure between the Kildin Sámi and Russians naturally blossomed as a result. In the 19th century, Kola Sámi were organized and advocated for themselves through "tight-knit familial communities" where they worked in pastures, lived by fishing, and survived through hunting all in a concrete set around defined territory with extended family. During this time, the community shared in spiritual customs and held similar ideologies on their language and community.

In the Russian Empire, the Kildin Sámi had no authority, rights or privileges, or liberties of autonomy and independence to control their affairs and to educate and teach their language through schools. After the 1917 Revolution which overthrew the tsarist regime of Nicholas II and led to the rise of the Bolsheviks, party systems, and emphasis towards a village-centered, peasant-centered, society, the Soviet state implemented laws or statutes that encouraged the development and protection of Sámi language and Sámi culture.

=== Stalinist era ===
During the 1930s, with an orientation toward Russian nationalism ("Russification") and Russian identity that came about more dramatically with Joseph Stalin's rise to power and his oppressive tactics, Kola Sámi languages and culture came under intense pressure. His oppressive agricultural, economic, and cultural policies also led to the arrest of those who resisted collectivization, including many who lived in the Kola tundras. As Russia entered World War II, Kildin Sámi youth were drafted to serve in the Red Army, which lessened hardships and prejudices they faced for a temporary period. Although the repression ended after the death of Stalin in 1953, Russification policies continued and the work with the Sámi languages started again only in the beginning of the 1980s when new teaching materials and dictionaries were published.

=== Current state ===
As social and cultural emphasis has been put on the writing and speaking of the various languages that constitute Russia, Kildin Sámi has now become a critically endangered language. Russian is prominently spoken in Kildin Sámi communities so much so that the original language is hardly ever heard of or only spoken privately amongst those who still know how to do so within an insular community. The few Kildin Sámi who speak and understand their language proficiently can also speak various dialectical tongues that constitute ethnic Russia. Because the language has eroded so rapidly over the centuries, it is more widely spoken amongst or between older elders who were taught and educated between themselves and thus retained the spoken language and hardly spoken by children. In Lovozero, Kildin Sámi was taught as an elective subject for first through fourth graders as of 2017; however, beginning in the 2014–15 school year, Kildin Sámi language instruction was folded into a broader class on Sámi history, culture, and folklore. The reasons for the loss and decline in speakership is as follows: a lack of education, dispersion of the Sámi, no generational transmission of traditional Sámi trades and ways of life, and not ever needing to speak or not regularly speaking the language have both caused speakership to take a hit over the years. Kildin Sámi is written using an official Cyrillic script.

== Phonology ==
Below is one analysis of the consonants in Kildin Sámi as given by The Oxford Guide to the Uralic Languages:

Consonant phonemes in Kildin Saami
		Labial		Alveolar		(Pre)-palatal		Velar	
		plain	pal.	plain	pal.	plain	pal.	plain	pal.
Nasal	voiceless	m̥	m̥ʲ	n̥	n̥ʲ				
Nasal	voiced	m	mʲ	n	nʲ	ɲ		ŋ	ŋʲ
Stop	preaspirated (Note: In some dialects preaspiration is realized as a preceding [ç] for palatalized phonemes and [x] for non-palatalized phonemes. e.g. пāһк (transl. mountain hill) /paːʰk/ is realized as [paːxk] and кӣһче (transl. look) /kiːʰt͡ʃʲɛ/ is realized as [kʲiːçt͡ʃʲe].)	ʰp	ʰpʲ	ʰt	ʰtʲ			ʰk	ʰkʲ
Stop	voiceless	p	pʲ	t	tʲ			k	kʲ
Stop	voiced	b	bʲ	d	dʲ			g	gʲ
Affricate	preaspirated			ʰt͡s	ʰt͡sʲ		ʰt͡ʃʲ		
Affricate	voiceless			t͡s	t͡sʲ		t͡ʃʲ		
Affricate	voiced			d͡z	d͡zʲ		d͡ʒʲ		
Fricative	voiceless	f	fʲ	s	sʲ	ʃ	ʃʲ	x	xʲ
Fricative	voiced	v	vʲ	z	zʲ	ʒ	ʒʲ		
Trill	voiceless			r̥	r̥ʲ				
Trill	voiced			r	rʲ				
Approximant	voiceless					j̊			
Approximant	voiced					j			
Lateral	voiceless			l̥	l̥ʲ				
Lateral	voiced			l	lʲ	ʎ			

- Geminates occur in all consonants, with the exception of preaspirated consonants, voiced alveolar and prepalatal fricatives and affricates (bold).

The Oxford Guide to the Uralic Languages gives the following inventory of monophthongs:

Monophthongs in Kildin Sámi
	Front		Central	Back	
	short	long	Central	short	long
Close	i ⟨и⟩	iː ⟨ӣ⟩	ɨ ⟨ы⟩	u ⟨у⟩	uː ⟨ӯ⟩
Mid	ɛ ⟨э⟩	ɛː ⟨э̄⟩		o ⟨о⟩	oː ⟨ō⟩
Open	a ⟨а⟩	aː ⟨ā⟩		ɒ ⟨оа⟩	ɒː ⟨ōā⟩

Rimma Kuruch's dictionary presents a slightly different set of monophthongs:

Monophthongs in Kildin Sámi
	Front		Central		Back	
	short	long	short	long	short	long
Close	i ⟨и⟩	iː ⟨ӣ⟩	ɨ ⟨ы⟩	ɨː ⟨ы̄⟩	u ⟨у⟩	uː ⟨ӯ⟩
Mid	e ⟨э⟩	eː ⟨э̄⟩			o ⟨о⟩	oː ⟨ō⟩
Open					a~ɐ ⟨а⟩	aː ⟨ā⟩

== Writing system ==
Kildin Sámi has been written in an extended version of Cyrillic since the 1980s. The alphabet has three variants with some minor differences among certain letters, mostly in Ҋ vs. Ј and ʼ (apostrophe) vs. Һ. The Sammallahti/Khvorostukhina dictionary (1991) uses Ҋ and ʼ (apostrophe); Antonova et al. (1985) uses Ј and Һ; a third orthographic variant, used by Kert (1986), has neither of these letters.

Note that the letters Ӓ, Ҋ/Ј, Һ/ʼ (apostrophe), Ӆ, Ӎ, Ӊ, Ӈ, Ҏ, Ъ, Ь, Ҍ and Ӭ do not occur in the word-initial position, either because the letters mark features of preceding consonants or the sounds they represent do not occur word initially. Therefore these letters do not normally occur in uppercase, except for all caps text.

The letter Щ occurs only in Russian loanwords.

А а	Ӓ ӓ	Б б	В в	Г г	Д д	Е е	Ё ё	Ж ж	З з	Һ һ	ʼ
/a/	/ʲa/	/b/	/v/	/ɡ/	/d/	/je/ or /ʲe/	/jo/ or /ʲo/	/ʒ/	/z/	/ʰ/	
И и	Й й	Ҋ ҋ	Ј ј	К к	Л л	Ӆ ӆ	М м	Ӎ ӎ	Н н	Ӊ ӊ	
/i/ or /ji/ or /ʲi/	/j/	/j̊/		/k/	/l/	/l̥/	/m/	/m̥/	/n/	/n̥/	
Ӈ ӈ	О о	П п	Р р	Ҏ ҏ	С с	Т т	У у	Ф ф	Х х	Ц ц	
/ŋ/	/о/	/p/	/r/	/r̥/	/s/	/t/	/u/	/f/	/x/	/ts/	
Ч ч	Ш ш	Щ щ	Ъ ъ	Ы ы	Ь ь	Ҍ ҍ	Э э	Ӭ ӭ	Ю ю	Я я	
/tʃ/	/ʃ/	/ç/		/ɨ/	/ʲ/	/ʲ/	/e/	/ʲe/	/ju/ or /ʲu/	/ja/ or /ʲa/	

The orthographic principles are more or less similar to Russian, but note the following special features.

=== Palatalization ===
Similar to Russian, palatalization of a consonant in Kildin Sámi is marked by the letter Ь or one of the vowel letters Е, Ё, И, Ю, and Я following the consonant. Palatalized Д, Т, Н, however, are marked by ҍ or one of the vowel letters Ӓ and Ӭ. The consonant letter Н before Ь or one of the vowel letters Е, Ё, И, Ю, and Я does not represent palatalization but the palatal nasal /ɲ/.

=== Long vowels ===
Long vowels are marked with a macron ⟨¯⟩ over the vowel letter (and above the diaeresis in the cases of Ё).

=== Preaspiration ===
The letter Һ occurs before the letters П, Т, К, Ц and Ч, and marks (historical) preaspiration. The actual pronunciation varies between true preaspiration [ʰ] and the fricative sounds [ç] and [x].

=== Voiceless sonorants ===
Voiceless sonorants are represented by the letters Ҋ/Ј, Ӆ, Ӎ, Ӊ, and Ҏ.

=== Velar nasal ===
The velar nasal is written as Ӈ.

== Morphophonology ==
Kildin Sámi exhibits a few morphophonological processes that are widespread throughout declension and conjugation paradigms. The first is consonant gradation, which is a phenomenon of alternations based on consonant length. This can be illustrated through some of the nonpast forms of the verb рāбпэ 'to dig'. The verb features the geminate consonant бп, which becomes weakened/shortened (quantitative gradation) to б in the first-person singular form рāба '[I] dig', but which is retained in the third-person singular form рāбп '[(S)he/it digs.' A more complete paradigm is below:

рāбпэ 'to dig'
	Nonpast		Past	
	SG	PL	SG	PL
1	рāб-а	рāбп-эпь	роабп-е	рāб-эмь
2	рāб-ак	рāбп-бэдтӭ	роабп-екь	рāб-этҍ
3	рāбп-Ø	рāбп-эв	рāб-э	роабп-энҍ

Consonant gradation can also be qualitative, meaning that there is a consonantal alternation based on a feature like voicing for instance, as is the case with the verb тӯссэ 'to illuminate'. The nonpast first-person singular form тӯза '[I] illuminate' comprises the alternation сс -> з, where not only is there a shortening of the geminate consonant but also a change from unvoiced to voiced.

тӯссэ 'to illuminate'
	Nonpast		Past	
	SG	PL	SG	PL
1	тӯз-а	тӯсс-эпь	тӯсс-е	тӯз-эмь
2	тӯз-ак	тӯсс-бэдтӭ	тӯсс-екь	тӯз-етҍ
3	туэсс-Ø	тӯсс-эв	тӯз-э	тӯсс-енҍ

Another morphophonological process is apophony, which manifests through a wide array of vowel alternations. In the word эххканкуэррьв 'windowsill', the vowel cluster уэ becomes у in certain declensions and уа in others:

эххканкуэррьв 'windowsill'
	SG	PL
NOM	эххканкуэррьв	эххканкуэрьв
ACC	эххканкуэрьв	эххканку(э)рьв-э
GEN	эххканкуэрьв	эххканку(э)рьв-этҍ
ILL	эххканкуаррв-а	эххканку(э)рьв-этҍ
LOC	эххканкуэрьв-эсьт	эххканку(э)рьв-энҍ
COM	эххканку(э)рьв-энҍ	эххканку(э)рьв-эгуэйм
ABE	эххканкуэрьв-ха	эххканку(э)рьв-эха

== Grammar ==
=== Nouns ===
Nouns in Kildin Sámi decline across 9 cases and two numbers, with the essive and partitive cases exceptionally not having distinct forms for number. Below is the declension paradigm for the word мӯрр 'tree.' Nouns fall under several different declension classes.

Case	Singular	Plural
Nominative	мӯрр	мӯр
Accusative	мӯр	мӯрэ
Genitive	мӯр	мӯрэтҍ
Illative	мӯрре	мӯрэтҍ
Locative	мӯрэсьт	мӯрэнҍ
Comitative	мӯрэнҍ	мӯрэгуэйм
Abessive	мӯрха	мӯрэха
Partitive	мӯррэ	
Essive	мӯррэнҍ	

==== Possessive suffixes ====
In Kildin Sámi, there is a series of suffixes that serve to encode relationships of possession. The suffixes can simultaneously carry information about the possessor (person and number) and the number of possessees (1 or 2+). The suffixes further decline. Possessive suffixes are no longer productive and are mainly preserved in kinship terms such as я̄нна(м) 'my mother'.

Possessor	Possessed (one or more)	Case							
Possessor	Possessed (one or more)	NOM	ACC	GEN	ILL	LOC	COM	ABE	ESS
1SG	1	-а(м) -ан	-ан		-(ъе)сан	-сан	-Эсан	-хэнан -анха	-ъян
1SG	2+	-а(м) -ан	-Эдан		-ъедан	-Эсан	-ангуйм -Эдангуйм	-ъяхтэнан -Эданха	-Эдан
1PL	1	-а(м) -ан	-Эдан		-Эдан	-Эсан	-ангуйм -Эдангуйм	-ъяхтэнан -Эданха	-ъедан
1PL	2+	-Эдан	-Эдан		-ъедан	-Эсан	-ангуйм -Эдангуйм	-ъяхтэнан -Эданха	-ъедан
2SG	1	-ат			-(ъе)сант	-сант	-Эсант	-хэнант -антха	-ъянт
2SG	2+	-ант	-Эдант		-ъедант	-Эсант	-анткуйм -Эданткуйм	-ъяхтэнант -Эдантха	-ъедант
2PL	1	-ант	-Эдант		-Эдант	-Эсант	-анткуйм -Эданткуйм	-ъяхтэнант -ъедантха	-ъедант
2PL	2+	-Эдант	-Эдант		-Эдант	-Эсант	-анткуйм -Эданткуйм	-ъяхтэнант -ъедантха	-ъедант
3SG	1	-Эсь			-ъесь	-Эсан	-Энэсь	-хэнэсь -Эсьха	-ъясь
3SG	2+	-Эдэсь			-ъедас	-Эсэсьт	-Эсьуйм -Энэськуйм	-ъяхтэнэсь -Эдэсьха	-ъедэсь
3PL	1	-Эдэсь			-Эдэсь	-Эсэсь	-Эсьуйм -Энэськуйм	-ъяхтэнэсь -ъедэсьха	-ъедэсь
3PL	2+	-Эдэсь			-Эдэсь	-Эсэсь	-Эсьуйм -Энэськуйм	-ъяхтэнэсь -ъедэсьха	-ъедэсь

=== Pronouns ===
Personal pronouns decline as other nouns do and encode number (singular or plural). Third-person pronouns do not make any grammatical gender distinctions.

Personal Pronouns
Case	1SG	1PL	2SG	2PL	3SG	3PL
NOM	мунн	мыйй	то̄нн	тыйй	со̄нн	сыйй
ACC	мун	мӣн	то̄н	тӣн	со̄н	сӣн
GEN	мун	мӣнэтҍ	то̄н	тӣнэтҍ	со̄н	сӣнэтҍ
ILL	мыннӭ	мыйе	тоннӭ	тыйе	соннӭ	сыйе
LOC	мунэсьт; муст	мӣнэнҍ	то̄нэсьт; тост	тӣнэнҍ	со̄нэсьт; сост	сӣнэнҍ
COM	мунэнҍ	мӣнэгуэйм	то̄нэнҍ	тӣнэгуэйм	со̄нэнҍ	сӣнэгуэйм
ABE	мунха	мӣнэха	то̄нха	тӣнэха	со̄нха	сӣнэха

Kildin Sámi has dedicated reflexive and reciprocal pronouns. Like personal pronouns, these too decline for case and number. The reflexive pronoun is ӣджь (NOM.SG) and the reciprocal pronoun is ка̄ннҍц (NOM.SG). The reciprocal pronoun is also used as a common noun meaning 'friend' (thus the construction appears to be a folk etymological calque of Russian друг друга). Below are example usages of each:

со̄нн ӣж-есь нӯраш-т
3SG.NOM REFL-3SG.ACC consider.young-3SG.NPST
'He considers himself to be young.'

вуаййп-э ка̄нҍц коанҍц-энҍ
fight-INF RECP.SG.NOM RECP-SG.COM
'To fight each other.' (cf. Russian биться друг с другом)

=== Negation ===
In Kildin Sámi negation is formed by a syntagma, which consists of a finite negative auxiliary and a finite main verb in a special form called connegative (negative form of the main verb). The negative auxiliary gets inflected by person, number and mood, while the main verb is marked for tense. In the past tense, the past participle is used as the connegative verb form.

This is the inflectional paradigm of the negative auxiliary:

	SG	PL
1st Person	эмм	ебпь
2nd Person	эгк	ебпе
3rd Person	эйй	ев
Impersonal	едтҍ	
Imperative	ель	елле

Negative clause in present tense:

мунн эмм тӣдҍ коаль Эвван лӣ пуадт-ма.
1SG.NOM NEG.1SG know.CNEG.NPST if Ivan be.3SG.NPST come-PTCP.PST.
"I don't know if/whether Ivan has come."

Negative clause in past tense:

со̄нн эйй те̄дтҍ-ма коаль со̄нн ё уййт-ма лӣ.
3SG.NOM NEG.3SG know-CNEG.PST if 3SG.NOM already go-PTCP.PST be.3SG.NPST
"S/he doesn't know if/whether s/he was already gone.ʹ

With the negation of the verb лӣйе "to be" in the third person it comes to an amalgamation of the main verb and the negative auxiliary:

- элля "[3SG] is not" = эйй 'NEG.3SG' + ля̄ 'be.CNEG.NPST'
- евла/евля "[3PL] are not" = ев 'NEG.3PL' + ля̄ 'be.CNEG.NPST'
- эллий = "[3SG] was not" = эйй 'NEG.3SG' + лӣйя 'be.CNEG.PST'

In the third person plural of the past tense there is no amalgamation of the negative auxiliary and the main verb "to be":

- ев лӣйя = "[3PL] were not"

Negative indefinite pronouns are formed with the negative prefix ни-. It is the only prefix in Kildin Sámi and is borrowed from the Russian language. The prefix ни- can get used with all interrogative pronouns, such as in нике̄ 'nobody' and нимӣ 'nothing'. See the following example depicting the latter:

ни-мэ̄нн мунн эмм уйн
NEG-what.SG.ACC 1SG.NOM 1SG.NEG see.CNEG.NPST
"I don't see anything."

== Vocabulary ==
=== Loanwords to English ===
The word tundra has been borrowed to English, via Russian. In Kildin Sámi, тӯндар (tūndâr) means "treeless plain", but its genitive case is тӯндрэ (tūndre).

== Literature ==
The printed item in Kildin were chapters 1-22 of the Gospel of Matthew published in 1897. It was translated with the help of native speaker consultants, in Cyrillic orthography by the Finnish linguist Arvid Genetz, and printed at the expense of the British and Foreign Bible Society. (The rest of the Gospel was in Akkala Sámi language.)

== See also ==
- Aleksandra Antonova
- Nina Afanasyeva
- Georgy Martynovitch Kert
