= Pentti Sammallahti =

Finnish photographer

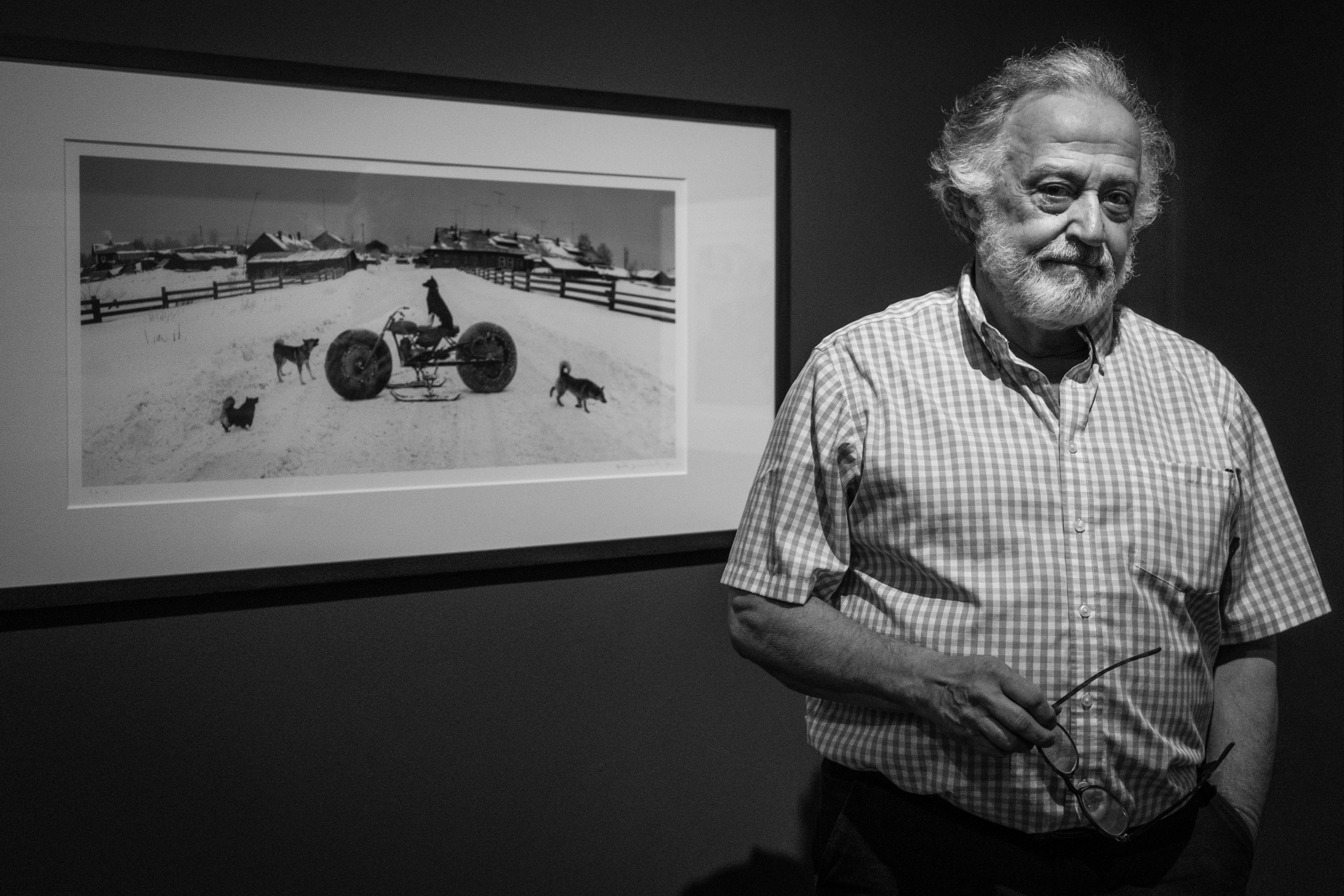
- Born: 1950 (age 74–75); Helsinki, Finland
- Occupation: Photographer
- Relatives: Pekka Sammallahti (brother)

Pentti Sammallahti (born 1950) is a Finnish photographer. He is the only brother of Finnish linguist Pekka Sammallahti.

He taught at the Art and Design University in Helsinki for 17 years. In 1991, he was given a twenty-year grant by the Finnish government.
