= Mikael Svonni =

Swedish Sámi linguist, professor, and translator

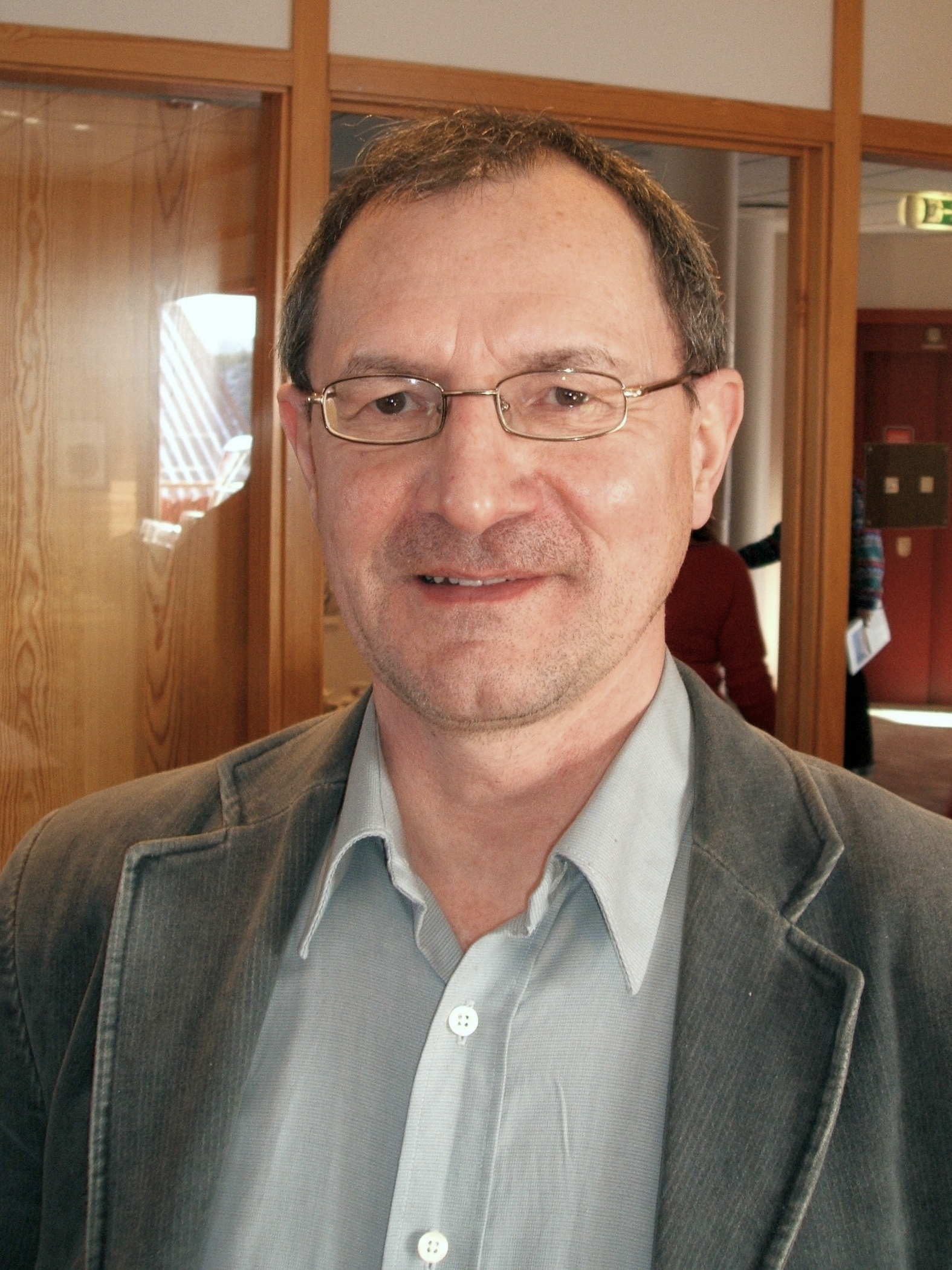
- Mikael Svonni in 2006
- Born: Enok Mikael Svonni; 3 September 1950 (age 75)
- Occupations: Linguist; Professor; Translator; Publisher
- Awards: Gollegiella (2014)

Enok Mikael Svonni (born 3 September 1950) is a Swedish Sámi linguist, professor, and translator.

== Early life ==
Svonni grew up in a reindeer-herding family in the Gabna Sami village in the municipality of Kiruna, spending the first two years of his life living in a peat goahti. One of the places he spent time was at his family's camp on Lake Rautas (Northern Sami: Rávttasjávri).

== Career ==
In 1993, he successfully defended his dissertation at Umeå University on the Sámi spoken by Sámi schoolchildren, a topic which many of his publications are devoted to. From that year until 2008, Svonni worked as a professor of Sami Language Studies at the Department of Language Studies at Umeå University. In 2008, he was named professor of Sámi Linguistics at the University of Tromsø where he worked until his retirement in 2017

During his academic career, he published scientific articles about Sámi in schools and later on worked on grammatical issues in Sámi.

As a translator, he has translated books like Astrid Lindgren's Ronia, the Robber's Daughter and August Strindberg's A Dream Play into Northern Sámi.

== Awards ==
He won the Gollegiella language award in 2014 in recognition and appreciation of the many years he has dedicated to the Northern Sámi language in Sweden.

== Personal life ==
He is married to Inez Svonni Fjällström, with whom he has three children. They live in Rávttas, north of Kiruna. Together, they founded a publishing house called Ravda Lágádus in order to publish a wider range of non-fiction, fiction, and children's books in Sámi.

== Selected bibliography ==
- Svonni, Mikael. Davvisámegiela-ruoŧagiela, ruoŧagiela-davvisámegiela sátnegirji. Nordsamisk-svensk, svensk-nordsamisk ordbok. Karasjok: ČálliidLágádus 2013 (ISBN 978-82-8263-122-8) 405 s. Universitetet i Tromsø
- Svonni, Mikael. Nuppi sátnegirjjis nuppi sátnegirjái — movt ovddit sátnegirjjit lea váikkuhan maŋit, hámiid ja sániid dáfus. Sámis 2013 (13) s. 12-19. Universitetet i Tromsø
- Svonni, Mikael. Johan Turi giella girjjis Muitalus sámiid birra: Veahkkevearbbaid ortnet ja posišuvdna. Sámi dieđalaš áigecála 2012 s. 25-47. Universitetet i Tromsø
- Svonni, Mikael. Language change among the Jukkasjärvi Sami. Veröffentlichungen der Societas Uralo-Altaica 2012 s. 233—242. Universitetet i Tromsø
- Svonni, Mikael. Johan Turi: first author of the Sami. Scandinavian Studies 2011; Volum 83.(4) s. 483—490. Universitetet i Tromsø
- Svonni, Mikael. Johan Turi — muitaleaddji ja čálli. Sámis 2010; Volum 8. s. 18-25. Universitetet i Tromsø
- Svonni, Mikael. Loahppasánit [Efterord]. I: Johan Turi: Muitalus sámiid birra. CálliidLágádus 2010. ISBN 978-82-8263-019-1. s. 193—198. Universitetet i Tromsø
- Svonni, Mikael. Samiska termer för ingifta personer — ett historiskt perspektiv. I: Samer som «de andra», samer om «de andra»: identitet och etnicitet i nordiska kulturmöten. Umeå: Umeå universitet 2010. ISBN 978-91-7459-051-7. s. 11-30. Universitetet i Tromsø
- Svonni, Mikael. Samerna i språkhistorien. I: För Sápmi i tiden. Nordiska museets och Skansens årsbok 2008. Stockholm: Nordiska museets förlag 2008. ISBN 9789171085238. s. 32-42. Universitetet i Tromsø
- Svonni, Mikael. Sámi languages in the Nordic countries and Russia. I: Multilingual Europe: Facts and Policies. Mouton de Gruyter 2008. ISBN 978-3-11-020512-1. s. 233—249. Universitetet i Tromsø
- Svonni, Mikael. Det tveeggade skolsystemet. Undervisningen av samernas barn i Sverige under 1900-talet fram till 1980. I: Mer än ett språk. En antologi om flerspråkigheten i norra Sverige. : Norstedts Akademiska Förlag 2007. ISBN 978-91-7227-519-5. s. 94-123. Universitetet i Tromsø
- Svonni, Mikael. Subjeavtta sadji ja finihtta cealkagiid struktuvra davvisámegielas. Sámi dieđalaš áigecála 2007 (1-2) s. 85-102. Universitetet i Tromsø
- Svonni, Mikael. Vearbakomplemeanttat davvisámegiela cealkagiin. Mémoires de la Société Finno-Ougrienne 2007 (253) s. 373—387. Universitetet i Tromsø
- Amft, Andrea; Svonni, Mikael 2006: Sápmi Y1K — Livet i samernas bosättningsområde för ett tusen år sedan. : Sámi dutkan — Samiska studier — Umeå universitet 2006 (ISBN 91-7264-091-X) 170 s. Sámi dutkan — Samiska studier — Sami studies(3). Universitetet i Tromsø
- Svonni, Mikael. Legenden om Riihmmagállis — Mannen från Rávttasjávri. I: Grenzgänger. Festschrift zum 65. Geburtstag von Jurij Kusmenko. Berlin: Nordeuropa-Institut der Humboldt-Universität 2006. ISBN 3-932406-24-9. s. 315—329. Universitetet i Tromsø
- Svonni, Mikael. Umesamiskan — Det gåtfulla språket. I: Sápmi Y1K — Livet i samernas bosättningsområde för ett tusen år sedan. : Sámi dutkan — Samiska studier — Umeå universitet 2006. ISBN 91-7264-091-X. s. 151—170. Universitetet i Tromsø
- Svonni, Mikael. Samiska språk. I: Nordens språk med rötter och fötter. Köpenhamn: Norden, Nordiska ministerrådet 2004. ISBN 92-893-1043-X. s. 97-111. Universitetet i Tromsø
- Svonni, Mikael; Vinka, Mikael. Constraints on the Morphological Causatives in the Torne Dialect of North Sámi. I: Generative approaches to Finnic and Saami linguistics: Case, features and constraints. Stanford, California: CSLI 2003. ISBN 157586412-6. s. 343—380. Universitetet i Tromsø
- Hyltenstam, Kenneth; Stroud, Christopher; Svonni, Mikael. Språkbyte, språkbevarande, revitalisering. Samiskans ställning i svenska Sápmi. I: Sveriges sju inhemska språk — ett minoritetsspråksperspektiv. Studentlitteratur 1999. ISBN 91-44-00777-9. s. 41-97. Universitetet i Tromsø
- Svonni, Mikael. Det tveeggade skolsystemet. En studie av samebarnens skolundervisning i Sverige under 1900-talet. Samiska studier. Umeå universitet.
- Svonni, Mikael. Hupmá go oktage sámegiela čuođi jagi geahčen. Giellamolsun vai giellaseailluheapmi — eavttuid ja miellaguottuid gažaldat. I: Vesa Guttorm (red.) Giellačállosat III. Dieđut 1998:1. Sámi Instituhtta
- Svonni, Mikael. Skolor och språkundervisning för en inhemsk minoritet — samerna. I: Tvåspråkighet med förhinder? Invandrar- och minoritetsundervisning i Sverige. Studentlitteratur 1996. ISBN 91-44-61441-1. s. 148—186. Universitetet i Tromsø
- Svonni, Mikael. Samiska skolbarns samiska. En undersökning av minoritetsspråksbehärskning i en språkbyteskontext. Umeå Studies in the Humanities 113. Stockholm: Almqvist&Wiksell 1993.
- Svonni, Mikael. Sámi-ruoŧa, ruoŧa-sámi sátnegirji : Samisk-svensk, svensk-samisk ordbok. Jokkmokk: Sámi Girjjit 1990. Universitetet i Tromsø, 266 s. ISBN 91-86604-23-6
