= Loparskaya =

Loparskaya Лопарская
- Railway station
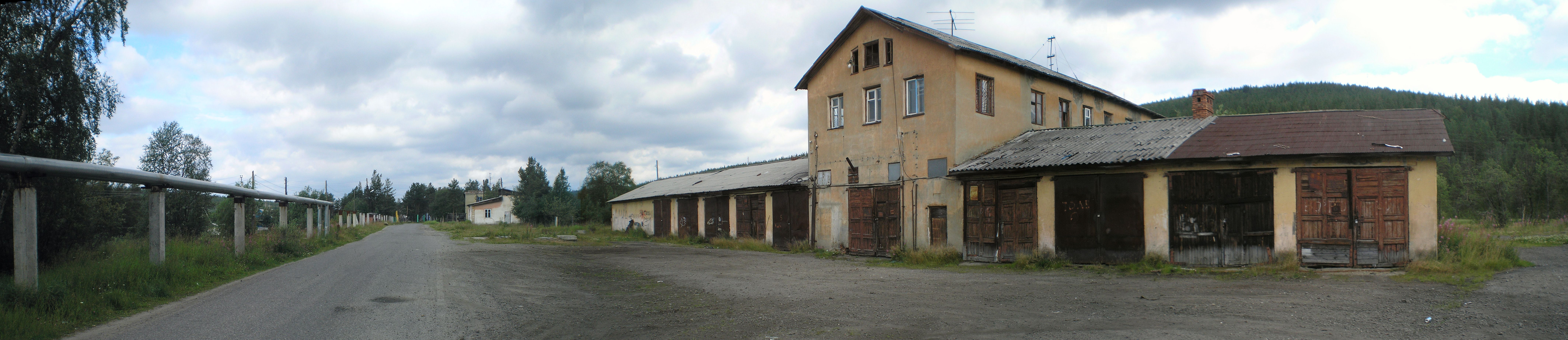
- A street in Loparskaya
- Interactive map of Loparskaya
- Location of Loparskaya Loparskaya (Murmansk Oblast)
- Coordinates: 68°37′43″N 33°14′35″E
- Country: Russia
- Federal subject: Murmansk Oblast
- Administrative district: Kolsky District
- Territorial okrugSelsoviet: Pushnovsky Territorial Okrug

Population (2010 Census)
  - Total: 173
  - Estimate (2021): 162 (−6.4%)

Municipal status
  - Municipal district: Kolsky Municipal District
  - Urban settlement: Pushnoy Rural Settlement
- Time zone: UTC+3 (MSK)
- Postal code: 184340
- Dialing code: +7 81553
- OKTMO ID: 47605404131

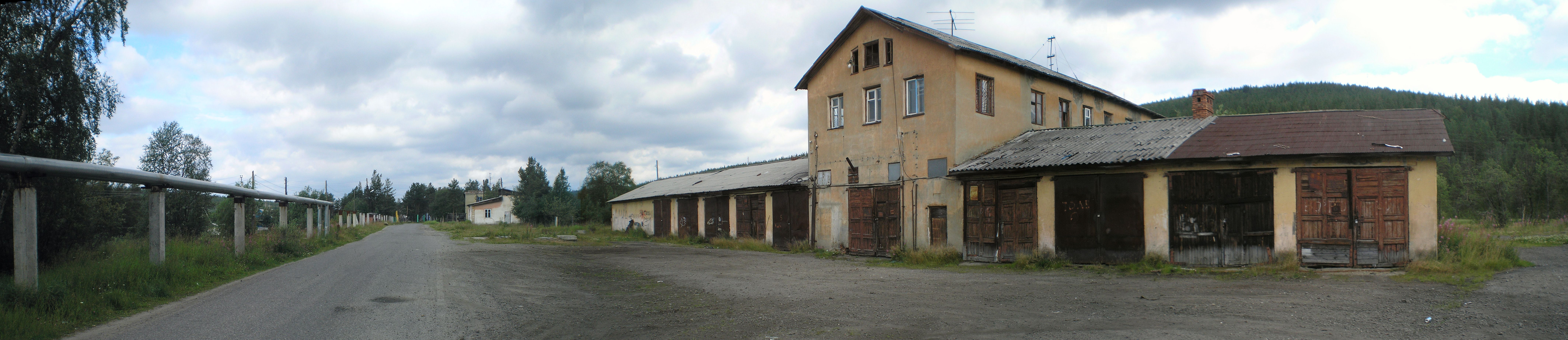
Loparskaya

Loparskaya (Russian: Лопарская) is a rural locality (a railway station) in Pushnovsky Territorial Okrug of Kolsky District of Murmansk Oblast, Russia, located on the Kola Peninsula beyond the Arctic Circle at a height of 106 meters (348 ft) above sea level. Population: 173 (2010 Census).

== Notable people ==
- Jelena Porsanger (born 1967) is a Russian Sami ethnographer and university rector
