= Teriberka =

Teriberka Териберка
- Selo
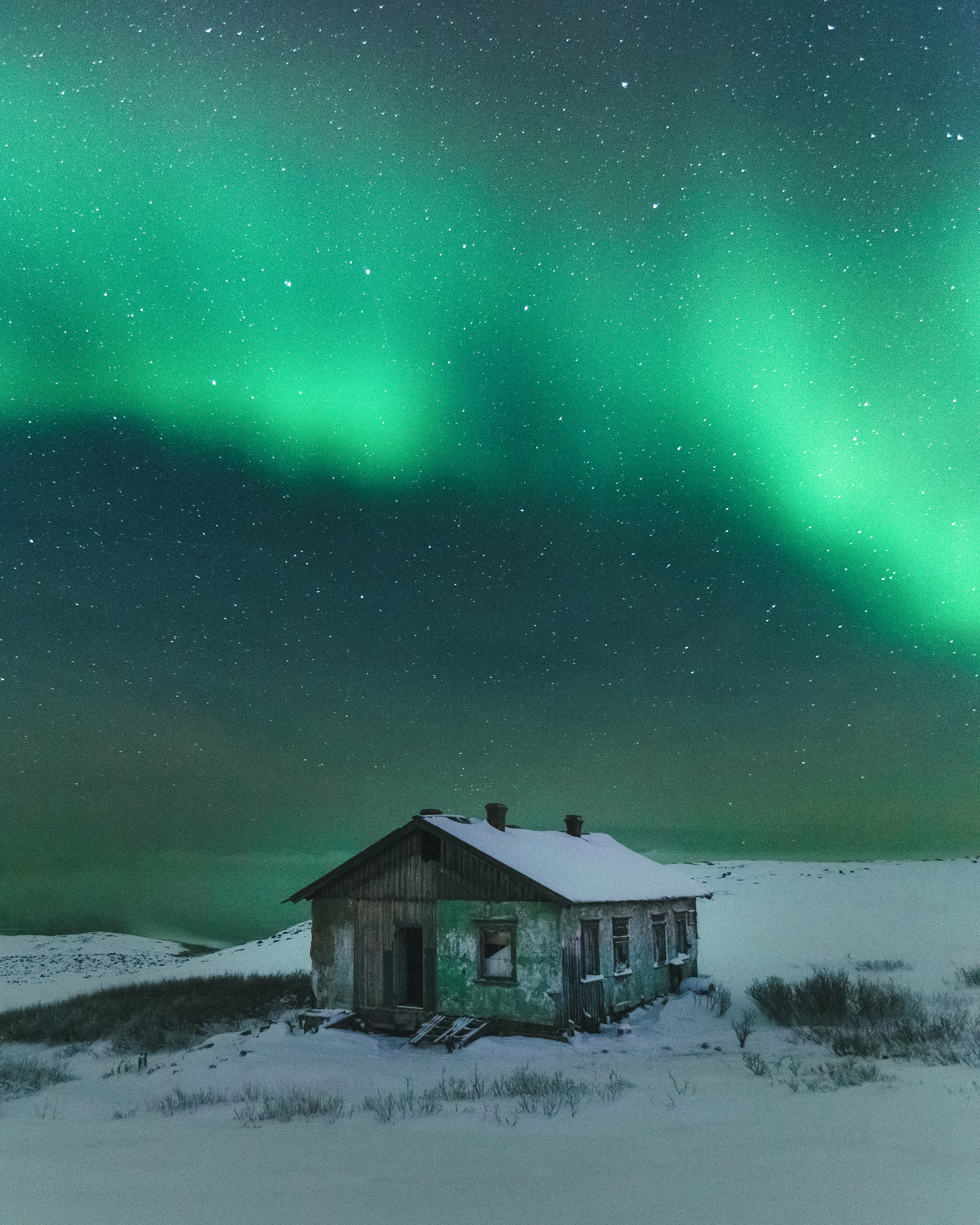

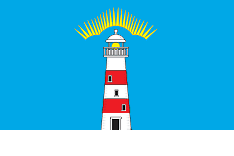
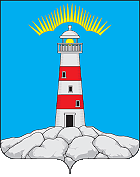
- Flag Coat of arms
- Interactive map of Teriberka
- Location of Teriberka Teriberka (Murmansk Oblast)
- Coordinates: 69°10′N 35°10′E
- Country: Russia
- Federal subject: Murmansk Oblast
- Administrative district: Kolsky District

Population (2010 Census)
  - Total: 957
  - Estimate (2021): 550 (−42.5%)
- Time zone: UTC+3 (MSK)
- Postal code: 184630
- Dialing code: +7 81553
- OKTMO ID: 47605405101

Teriberka (Russian: Тери́берка) is a rural locality (a selo) in Kolsky District of Murmansk Oblast, Russia, located on the Barents Sea coast, at the mouth of the river Teriberka.

== History ==
As a settlement, Teriberka was first mentioned circa 1523. Eyewitnesses from that time period confirmed the appearance of permanent Russian settlers. However, according to other sources, it was founded in the 1860s—the decade when the Murman coast was actively being settled.

By the end of 19th century, it was well-developed: having a church, a lighthouse, and a weather station (the first one on the Murmansk coast).

Names of the geographical features of the area, such as Cape Deploranskogo, Zavalishina Lip, and others relate to the Peter's Great expedition.

In the beginning of the 20th century, Teriberka had well-developed cod and shark fishing businesses (undertaken mostly by the Norwegians who owned a factory and a store). By the end of the 1920s, the first collective farm was organized in the village; it included a dairy farm and a reindeer herd in addition to the fishing boats.

Before World War II, fishermen and dairy farm workers of the collective farm were honored several times for their achievements and were sent to the VDNKh in Moscow. A shipyard construction in the village of Lyudeyny started around the same time.

Teriberka developed quickly after the war. In the 1940s–1960s, there were two fishing farms, two dairy farms, a poultry farm, a 2000-head reindeer herd, an American mink breeding farm, and two fish processing facilities in the village, as well as shops and warehouses of the White Sea base of Goslov (a government-sponsored organization of skilled workers). Repair facilities of the shipyard were working at their full capacity and were being expanded. Active construction of housing and public organizations was underway. The village had a stadium, a community center, workers' clubs of the shipyard, a fish processing facility, a Young Pioneers club, two schools (elementary and secondary), a boarding school for children from the coastal settlements, one inpatient and one outpatient hospital, and an ambulance station.

Teriberka became the administrative center of a district and was growing and developing at a very fast rate.

The downfall began in the 1960s, when the district was transferred to the jurisdiction of the town of Severomorsk. As ship tonnage increased and fishing fleets were able to travel more easily in the open ocean, the coastal fishing business became less important. A newly constructed fish processing complex in Murmansk put smaller processing facilities in Teriberka out of business.

During the process of "enlargement", the collective farm "Murmanets" was abolished along with its mink farm. Goslov's White Sea base fell apart, the reindeer herd was transferred to the village of Lovozero, and the fish processing plant was shut down because large fishing vessels were not able to enter the river from the ocean.

In the 1980s, a school of salmon was destroyed during the construction of the Teriberka River hydroelectric plants. In the 2000s, the village was again subordinated to the district instead of the town of Severomorsk.

== Climate ==
Climate data for Teriberka
Month	Jan	Feb	Mar	Apr	May	Jun	Jul	Aug	Sep	Oct	Nov	Dec	Year
Record high °C (°F)	7.5 (45.5)	6.4 (43.5)	7.3 (45.1)	13.6 (56.5)	28.0 (82.4)	30.4 (86.7)	34.5 (94.1)	33.8 (92.8)	25.8 (78.4)	14.2 (57.6)	9.0 (48.2)	9.1 (48.4)	34.5 (94.1)
Mean daily maximum °C (°F)	−4.0 (24.8)	−4.5 (23.9)	−2.1 (28.2)	1.4 (34.5)	6.3 (43.3)	11.2 (52.2)	15.5 (59.9)	14.0 (57.2)	10.2 (50.4)	4.4 (39.9)	−0.2 (31.6)	−2.0 (28.4)	4.2 (39.5)
Daily mean °C (°F)	−6.9 (19.6)	−7.3 (18.9)	−4.5 (23.9)	−0.9 (30.4)	3.5 (38.3)	7.8 (46.0)	11.9 (53.4)	11.1 (52.0)	7.9 (46.2)	2.2 (36.0)	−2.5 (27.5)	−4.6 (23.7)	1.5 (34.7)
Mean daily minimum °C (°F)	−9.8 (14.4)	−10.2 (13.6)	−7.1 (19.2)	−3.2 (26.2)	1.1 (34.0)	5.1 (41.2)	8.9 (48.0)	8.5 (47.3)	5.6 (42.1)	0.4 (32.7)	−4.9 (23.2)	−7.4 (18.7)	−1.1 (30.1)
Record low °C (°F)	−29.6 (−21.3)	−31.2 (−24.2)	−32.0 (−25.6)	−24.0 (−11.2)	−11.9 (10.6)	−4.4 (24.1)	−0.5 (31.1)	−0.8 (30.6)	−7.5 (18.5)	−20.7 (−5.3)	−23.5 (−10.3)	−28.4 (−19.1)	−32.0 (−25.6)
Average precipitation mm (inches)	27.4 (1.08)	21.4 (0.84)	26.7 (1.05)	23.5 (0.93)	33.2 (1.31)	48.8 (1.92)	56.6 (2.23)	54.8 (2.16)	53.5 (2.11)	63.1 (2.48)	31.8 (1.25)	28.9 (1.14)	469.7 (18.5)
Source: Pogodaiklimat.ru

== Tourism ==
Teriberka can be reached by road from Murmansk in around two to two and a half hours, it is almost completely paved (the contractor finishing the reconstruction works), but can be difficult to traverse in poor weather. Bus №241 runs from Murmansk four days a week. The townscape is quite striking, and the location on the Barents Sea is picturesque. There is a good sandy beach in the village, which is used by locals and by Murmansk residents in warm weather. The village is being actively built up with various facilities for tourism and leisure, already has few restaurants, cafes and hotels. There is a collection of abandoned and decaying wooden boats, a "ship's graveyard" on the west bank of the estuary of the Teriberka River. The village has one shop and a small church.

== In popular culture ==
The 2014 Russian drama movie Leviathan, which won a Golden Globe in 2015, was filmed in Teriberka; filming also took place in Kirovsk and Olenegorsk.

== Notable people ==
- Aleksandra Andreevna Antonova (1932–2014), Kildin Sámi teacher, writer, poet, translator
