= Nina Afanasyeva =

Russian-Sami politician and language activist

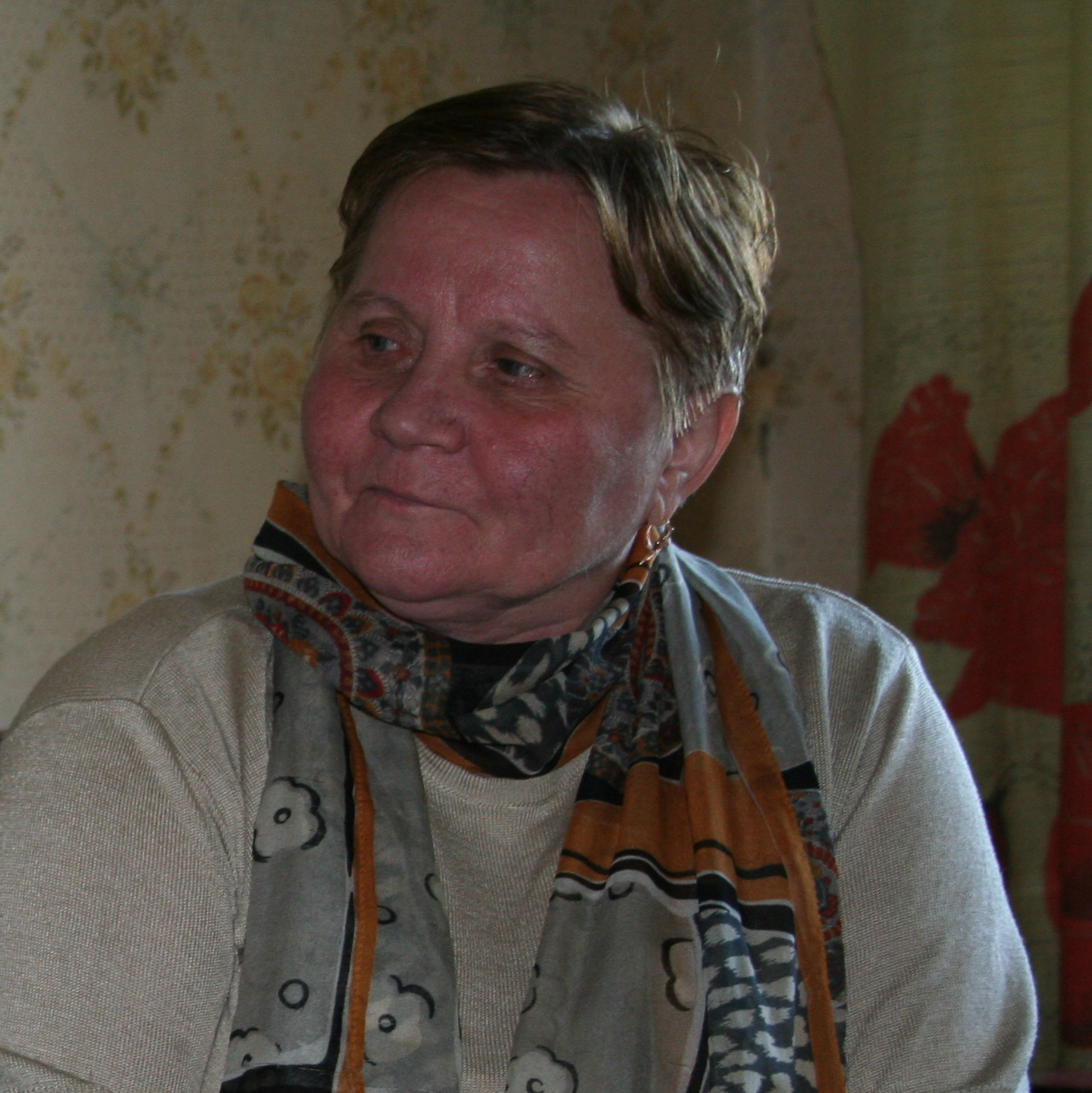
Nina Afanasyeva (2006)

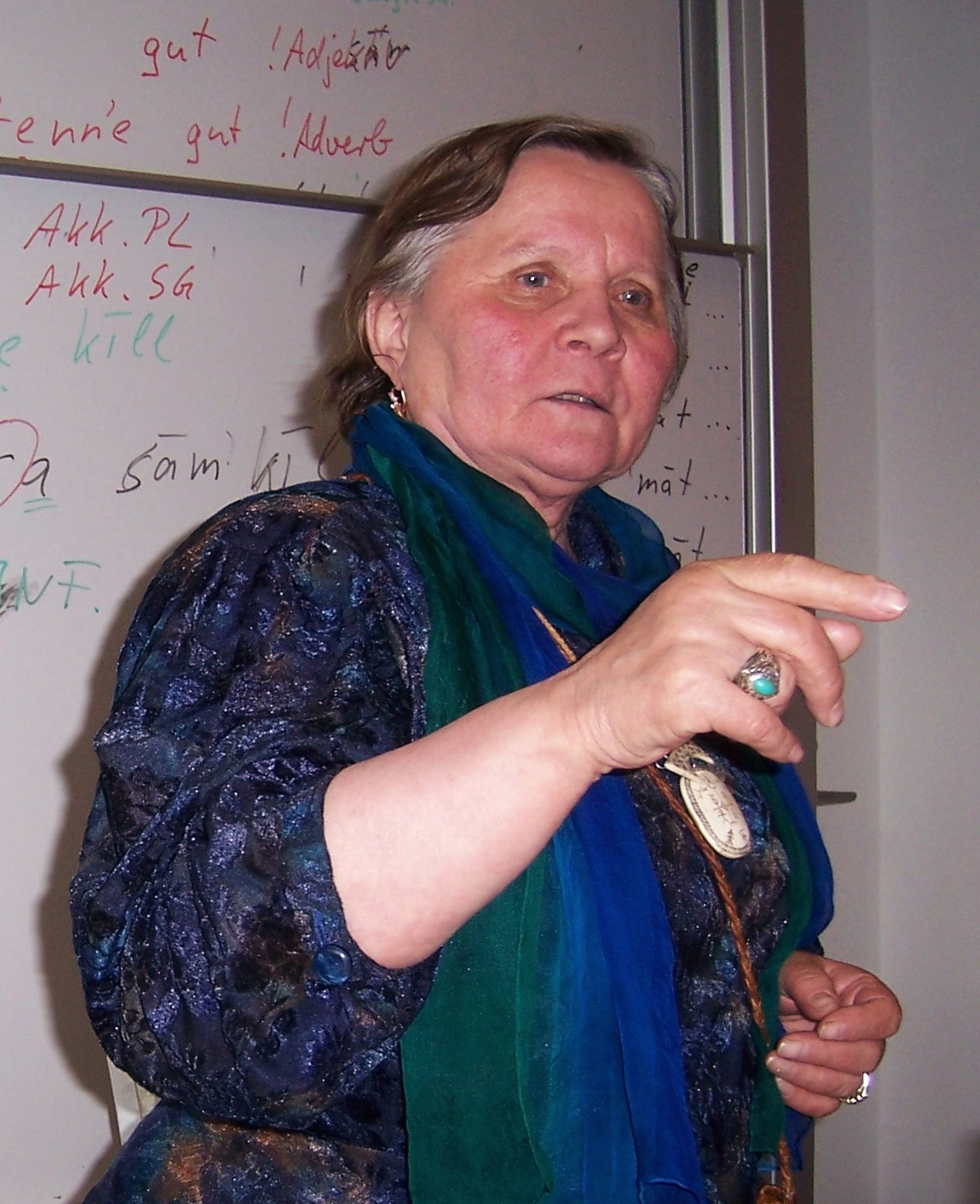
Nina Afanasyeva teaches Kildin at the Humboldt University in Berlin (2007)

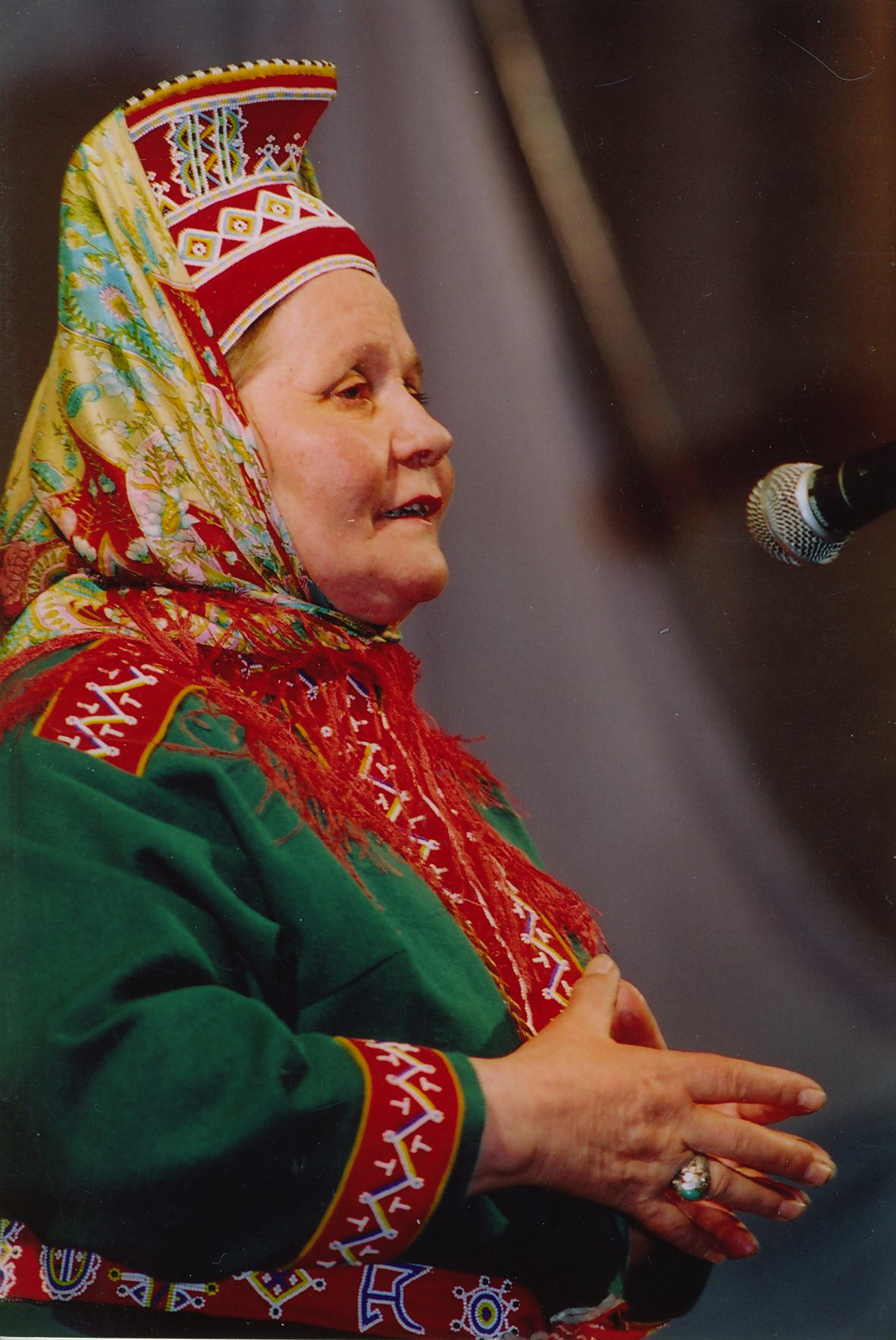
Nina Afanasyeva (2014)

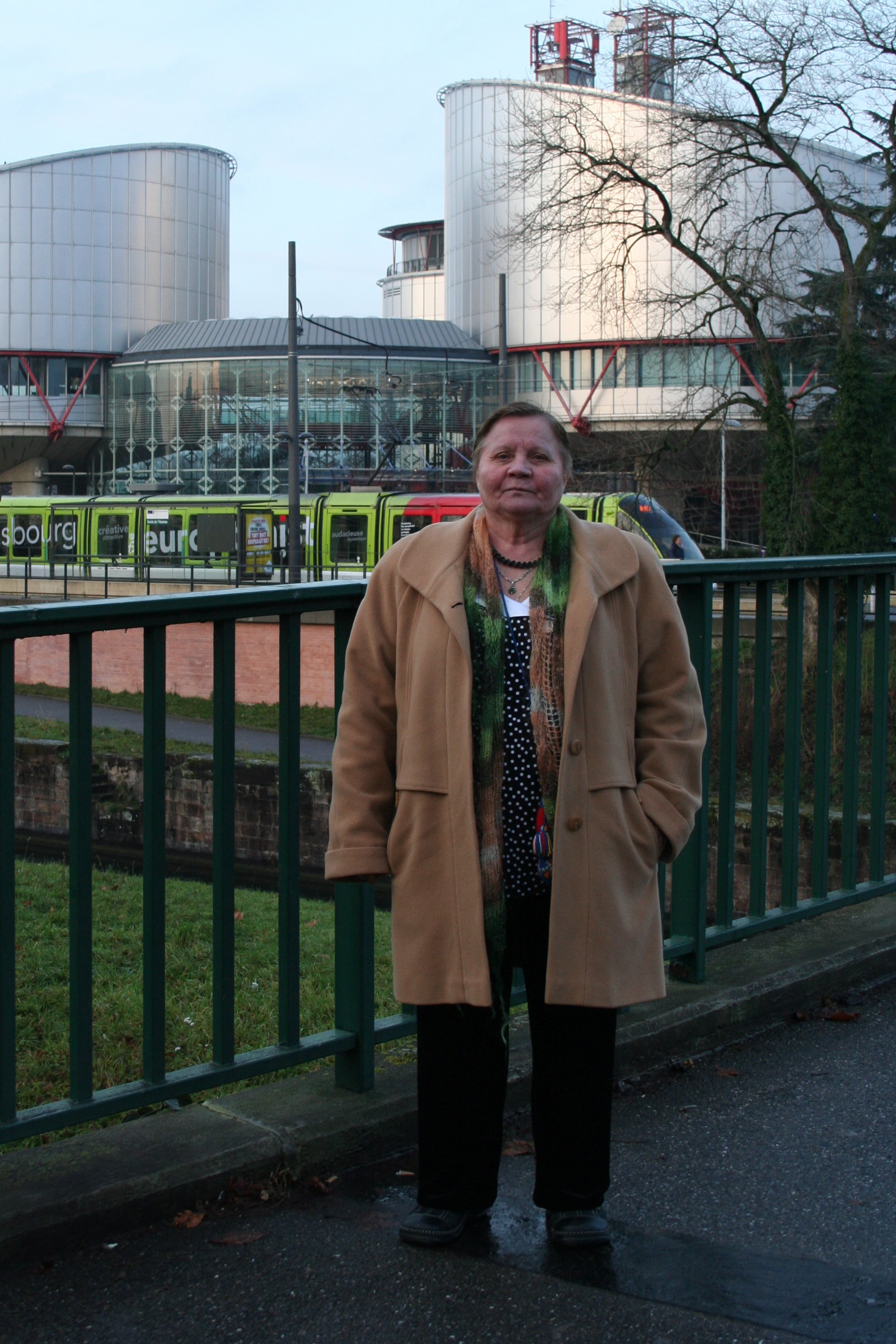
Nina Afanasyeva in front of the European Court of Human Rights in Strasbourg (2014)

Nina Yeliseyevna Afanasyeva (Russian: Нина Елисеевна Афанасьева; pseudonym, Kildin Sami: Е̄льцэ Нӣна Афанасьева, romanized: Jeel'ce Niina Afanas'jeva; born February 1, 1939) is a Russian-Sami politician and language activist.

== Biography ==
Nina Yeliseyevna Afanasyeva was born on February 29, 1939, in the village of Varsino. Her parents were Sami, and she grew up with the Kildin Sámi language as her mother tongue.

In 1963, she completed her studies in pedagogy at the Institute of the Peoples of the North in Leningrad and worked until 1983 as a teacher of Russian language and literature as well as German in adult education in the cities of Apatity and Murmansk.

Since 1980, Afanasyeva has been working on the conservation and development of the endangered Sami languages on the Kola Peninsula. She is co-author of the first Kildin Sami-Russian dictionary, which was published in 1985 under the editorship of Rimma Kurutsch. In addition to the dictionary, Afanasyeva co-authored the publication of a series of textbooks and didactic materials for the Kildin language. She is also the author of a Kildin Sami-Russian phrasebook (2010).

Since the time of perestroika, Afanasyeva has been active as a Sami politician and minority activist. She was instrumental in founding the Association of Sámi in Murmansk Oblast in 1998 and headed this NGO from 1990 to 2010, serving as president. She also served as president of the Saami Council from 1995 to 1996.

Afanasyeva is fluent not only in Kildin Sami and Russian, but also in Northern Sami and German. She has been working publishing a dictionary for her native dialect, which has hardly been documented by linguists so far. For this purpose, she has been working for several years on the systematization of the familiar vocabulary and collects, with the help of the few surviving speakers, new words, phrases, and place names from the area of their forcibly-displaced birthplace.

On November 23, 2012, Afanasyeva and Alexandra Antonova were awarded the Sami Language Prize Gollegiella ("Golden Language") together during the session of the Norwegian Parliament in Oslo. The award was presented on December 19 at the Norwegian Consulate General in Murmansk. The rationale for the joint award of Afanasyeva and Antonova was their leading role in the revitalization of the Kildin Sámi language as a teacher, politician, writer and translator.

Afanasyeva lives and works in Murmansk.

== Selected works ==
- 1985 Саамско-русский словарь
- 1988 Saamʼ kīll: razrabotki po saamskomu jazyku dlja natsjalʼnoj shkoly
- 1990 Metoditsjeskoje rukovodstvo po obutsjeniju saamskomu jazyku: primernyje pourotsjnyje razrabotki k utsjebniku saamskogo jazyka dlja I-go klassa
- 1990, Metoditsjeskoje rukovodstvo po obutsjeniju saamskomu jazyku: primernyje pourotsjnyje razrabotki k utsjebniku saamskogo jazyka dlja 2-ogo klassa
- 1990, Metoditsjeskoje rukovodstvo po obutsjeniju saamskomu jazyku v natsjal’noj shkole
- 1990, Saamskij jazyk v kartinah: utsjebnik po razvitiju retsji v 1-om klasse saamskoj shkoly
- 1990, Sam’ kill: utsjebnik saamskogo jazyka dlja 2-go klassa
- 1991, Pudz’jench: kniga dlja dopolnitel’nogo tsjtenija v saamskoj natsional’noj shkole
- 1991, Sam’ kill: utsjebnik saamskogo jazyka dlja 3-ogo klassa
- 1991, Soagknehk’: saamsko-russkij i russko-saamskij slovar’ dlja natsjal’noj shkoly
- 1995, Pravila orfografii i punktuacii saamskogo jazyka
- 2000, "Hilferuf vom Rande des Eismeers", in: Die Saami, hrsg. von Wolf-Dieter Seiwert. Leipzig
- 2008, Ла̄зер ка̄ллса моаййнас. Кырьха лӣ Е̄льцэ Нӣна
- 2009, Severnoe sijanie: saamskij jazyk v kartinkah
- 2010, Самь-рушш соарнънэгк
- 2012, "Современное состояние саамского языка", in: Коренные народы евро-арктического региона

== Awards ==
- 2012, International Sami Language Award Gollegiella (together with Aleksandra Andreevna Antonova)
