= Pekka Sammallahti =

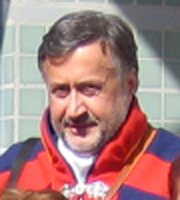
Pekka Sammallahti in Oulu in May 2005

Pekka Lars Kalervo Sammallahti (Inari Sami: Sevtil-Piäkká, May 21, 1947 in Helsinki) is a professor of Sámi languages at the Giellagas Institute at the University of Oulu. A prolific writer, he has published more than 100 books and articles related to Sápmi and the various Sámi languages. Sammallahti has also been a driving force in the work done to create official written languages for a number of Sámi languages.

He is a member of the Norwegian Academy of Science and Letters.

He is the only brother of photographer Pentti Sammallahti.

== Works ==
- Korhonen, Mikko, Jouni Mosnikoff, Pekka Sammallahti. 1973: Koltansaamen opas. Castrenianumin toimitteita; 4. Helsinki : Suomalais-ugrilainen seura,
- Mosnikoff, Jouni & Pekka Sammallahti 1988: U'cc sääm-lää'dd sää'nnkeârjaz = Pieni koltansaame-suomi sanakirja [Utsjoki] : Jorgaleaddji, 1988.
- Sammallahti, Pekka 1974: Material from Forest Nenets. Castrenianumin toimitteita; 2 Helsinki : [s.n.], 1974.
- Sammallahti, Pekka 1975: Sodankylän saamelaisten entistä elämää. Elsa-Marja Aikion kertomana. Castrenianumin toimitteita; 14 Helsinki : [s.n.], 1975.
- Sammallahti, Pekka 1977: Norjansaamen Itä-Enontekiön murteen äänneoppi. Suomalais-ugrilaisen seuran toimituksia; 160 Helsinki : Suomalais-ugrilainen seura.
- Sammallahti, Pekka 1980: Jietnadatoahppa : fonetihka vuođđoássit 1. Dieđut; Nr.2-1980.Guovdageaidnu : Sámi instituhtta, 1980.
- Sammallahti, Pekka 1989: Sámi-suoma sátnegirji = Saamelais-suomalainen sanakirja. Ohcejohka : Jorgaleaddji.
- Sammallahti, Pekka 1993: Sámi-suoma-sámi sátnegirji = Saamelais-suomalais-saamelainen sanakirja. Ohcejohka : Girjegiisá
- Sammallahti, Pekka & Mosnikoff, Jouni 1991: Suomi-koltansaame sanakirja = Lää'dd-sää'm sää'nnke'rjj. Ohcejohka : Girjegiisá, 1991.
- Sammallahti, Pekka & Morottaja, Matti 1993: Säämi-suomâ sänikirje = Inarinsaamelais-suomalainen sanakirja. Ohcejohka : Girjegiisá, 1991.
- Sammallahti, Pekka 1998: The Saami languages : an introduction. Kárásjohka : Davvi girji.
- Sammallahti, Pekka 2002: North Saami resource dictionary. Publications of the Giellagas Institute; vol. 1. Oulu : Oulun Yliopisto, 2002.
- Sammallahti, Pekka 2005: Láidehus sámegiela cealkkaoahpa dutkamii. Kárásjohka : Davvi girji, 2005.
- Sammallahti, Pekka & Klaus Peter Nickel 2006: Sámi-duiskka sátnegirji = Sáámisch-deutsches wörterbuch.. Karasjok : Davvi Girji, 2006.
- Sammallahti, Pekka 2007: Gielladutkama terminologiija. Kárásjohka : Davvi girji, 2007.
- Sammallahti, Pekka 2007: Inarinsaamen käänteissanakirja - Inari Saami Reverse Dictionary. Publications of the Giellagas Institute; vol. 6. Oulu : [Oulun Yliopisto], 2007.
- Nickel, Klaus Peter & Pekka Sammallahti 2008: Duiskka-sámi sátnegirji = Deutsch-saamisches wörterbuch.. Karasjok : Davvi Girji, 2008.
- Nickel, Klaus Peter & Pekka Sammallahti 2011: Nordsamisk grammatikk.. Karasjok : Davvi Girji, 2011.
