= Skull cup =

Type of bowl or drinking vessel

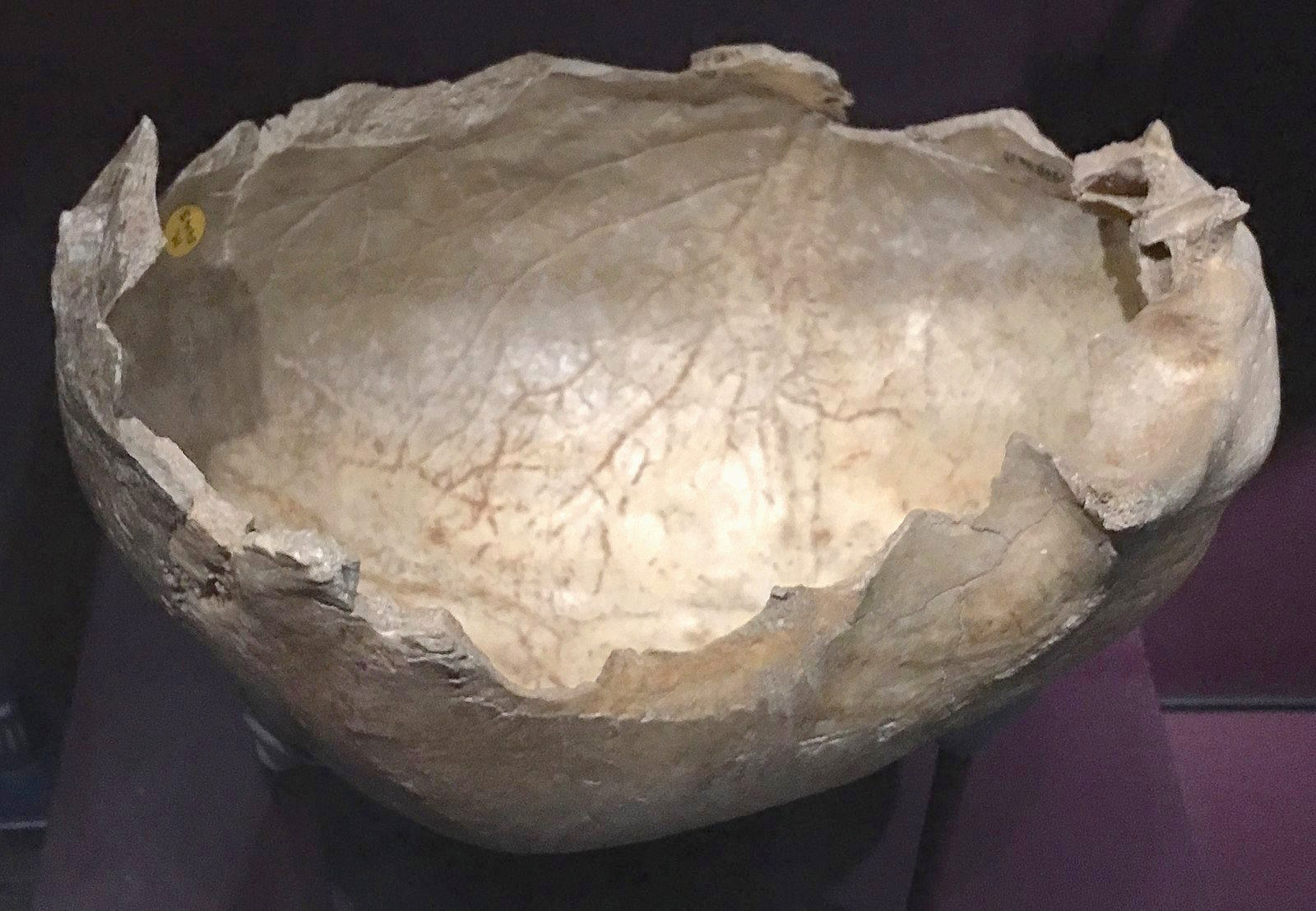
The skull cup from Gough's Cave

A skull cup is a cup or eating bowl made from an inverted human calvaria that has been cut away from the rest of the skull. The use of a human skull as a drinking cup in ritual use or as a trophy is reported in numerous sources throughout history and among various peoples, and among Western cultures is most often associated with the historically nomadic cultures of the Eurasian Steppe.

The oldest directly dated skull cup at 14,700 cal BP (12,750 BC) comes from Gough's Cave, Somerset, England. Skulls used as containers can be distinguished from plain skulls by exhibiting cut-marks from flesh removal and working to produce a regular lip.

== Asia ==
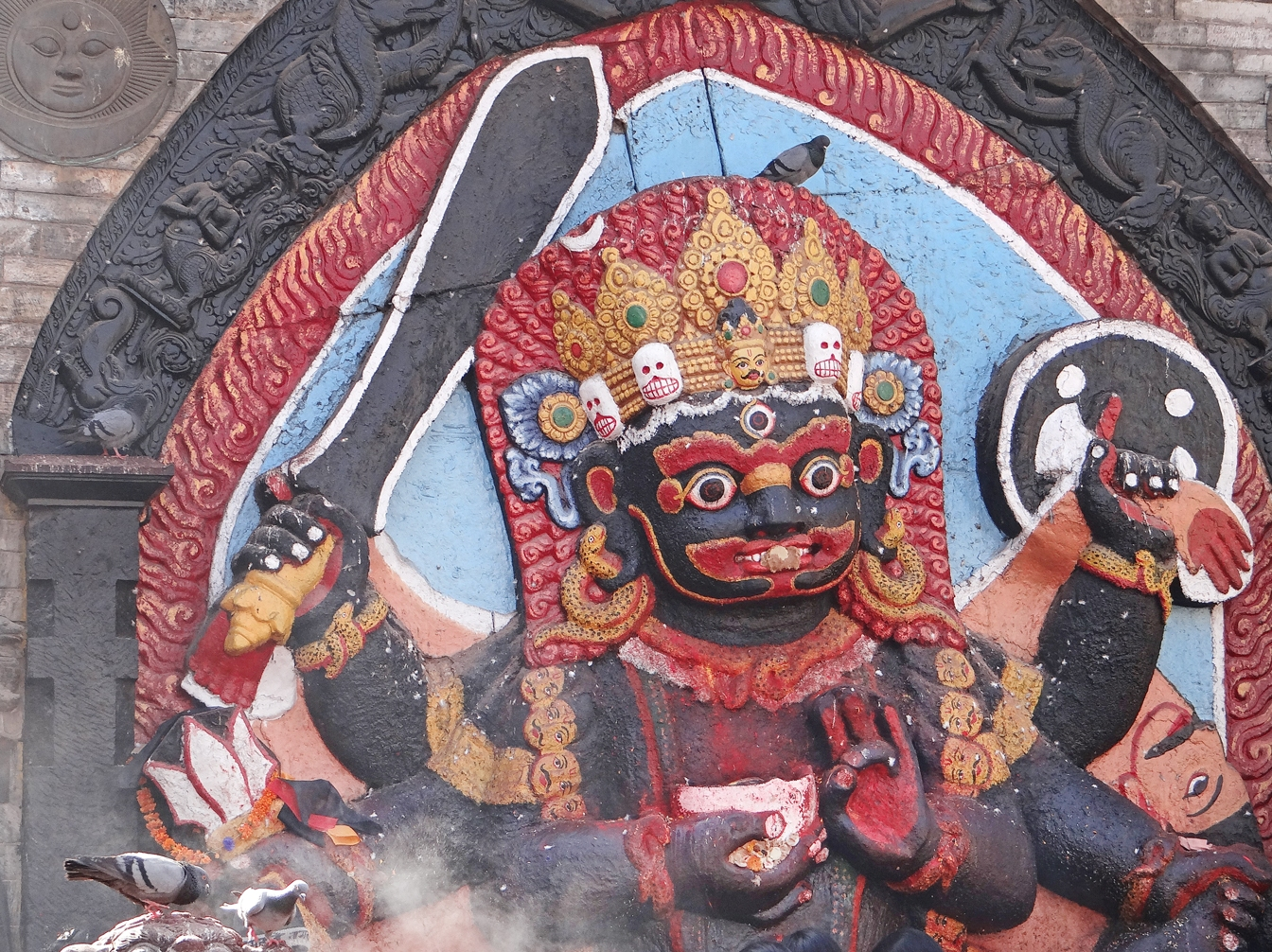
Hindu deity Bhairava with a kapala (skull cup) in his hand

The oldest record in the Chinese annals of the skull-cup tradition dates from the last years of the Spring and Autumn period, when the victors of the Battle of Jinyang in 453 BC lacquered the skull of their enemy into a winecup. Later, the Records of the Grand Historian recorded the practice among the ancient Xiongnu of present-day Mongolia. Laoshang (or Jizhu), son of the Xiongnu chieftain Modu Chanyu, killed the king of the Yuezhi around 162 BC, and in accordance with their tradition, "made a drinking cup out of his skull". According to the biography of the envoy Zhang Qian in Han shu, the drinking cup made from the skull of the Yuezhi king was later used when the Xiongnu concluded a treaty with two Han ambassadors during the reign of Emperor Yuan of Han (49-33 BC). To seal the convention, the Chinese ambassadors drank blood from the skull cup with the Xiongnu chiefs.

In India and Tibet, the skull cup is known as a kapala, and is used in Buddhist tantric and Hindu tantric rituals. The skull does not belong to an enemy, and indeed the identity of the skull's original owner is not considered significant. Hindu deities such as Kali are sometimes depicted holding a kapala full of human blood. Many carved and elaborately mounted kapalas survive, mostly in Tibet.

An anecdote about the prolific Korean Buddhist scholar Wonhyo in the year 661 says that he and a close friend named Uisang (625–702) were traveling to China, when, somewhere in the region of Baekje, the pair were caught in a heavy downpour and forced to take shelter in what they believed to be an earthen sanctuary. During the night Wonhyo was overcome with thirst, and reaching out grasped what he perceived to be a gourd, and drinking from it was refreshed with a draught of cool, refreshing water. Upon waking the next morning, however, the companions discovered much to their shock that their shelter was in fact an ancient tomb littered with human skulls, and the vessel from which Wonhyo had drunk was a human skull full of brackish water.

In 1510, Shah Ismail I defeated and slew Muhammad Shaybani, founder of the Shaybanid Empire in present-day Uzbekistan, in battle. The Shah had his enemy's body dismembered and the parts were sent to various areas of the empire for display, while his skull was coated in gold and made into a jewelled drinking goblet.

In Japan, there is an anecdote that Oda Nobunaga, a famous feudal lord from the Sengoku period, drank sake from the skulls of defeated enemy warlords. However, it has been claimed in recent years that it may be a fabrication. The highly reliable contemporaneous historical document Shinchō Kōki and the secondary source Azai Sandai Ki state that Nobunaga unveiled the skulls of Asakura Yoshikage, Azai Hisamasa and Nagamasa, which had been made into hakudami (lacquered and painted with gold mud), to his closest vassals, and made them serve to relish the sake at a feast in the lunar New Year 1574. However, it does not state that he drank sake using the skulls as sakazuki. It is not certain what Nobunaga's intention was in revealing the skulls, as there are no surviving impressions of those who saw them. Some say it was simply because he was cruel, while others believe it was out of respect for his enemies rather than desecration of the dead.

== Europe ==
People of the Magdalenian culture of the Upper Paleolithic of Europe, spanning around ~23,000–13,500 years ago, produced skull cups, which is associated with cannibalistic practices.

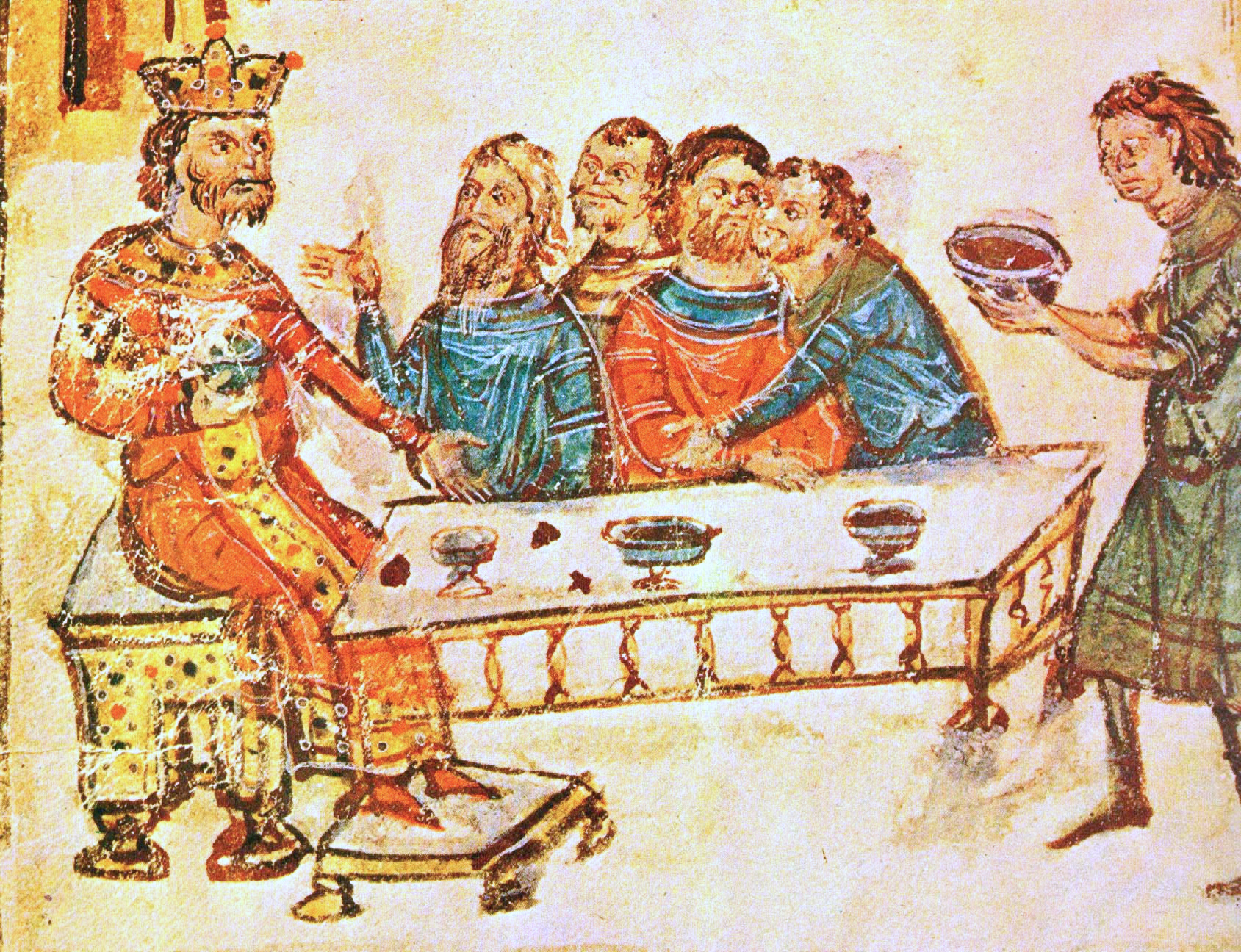
Bulgarian Khan Krum the Fearsome feasts with his nobles as a servant (right) brings the skull of Nikephoros I, fashioned into a drinking cup, full of wine.

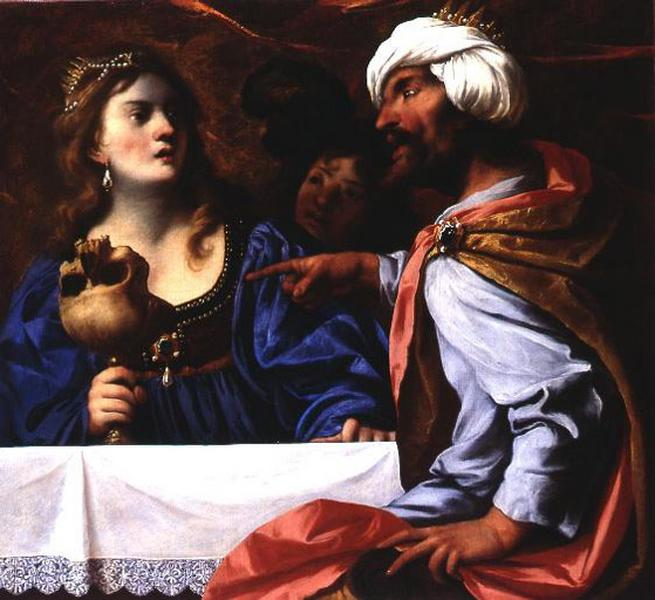
Pietro della Vecchia - Rosamund forced to drink from the skull of her father Cunimund

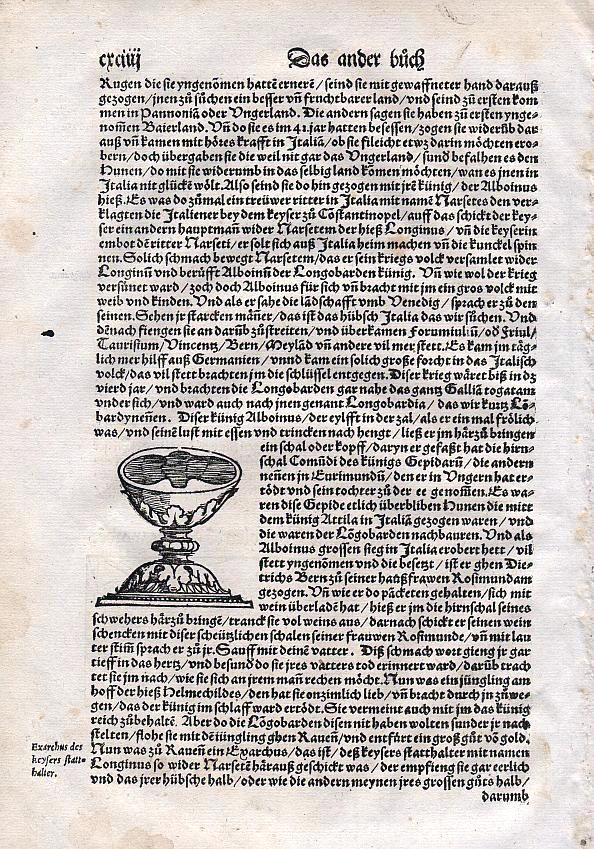
Sebastian Münster Cosmographia (Basel, 1550) page 193, concerning Lombards and imaginatively illustrating the notorious skull cup

According to Herodotus' Histories and Strabo's Geographica, the Scythians killed their enemies and made their skulls into drinking cups.

Edouard Chavannes quotes Livy to illustrate the ceremonial use of skull cups by the Boii, a Celtic tribe in Europe, in 216 BC.

In Germanic mythology, Wayland the Smith was enslaved by a king. In revenge, Wayland killed the king's sons and fashioned goblets from their skulls; he sent the goblets to the king.

According to Paul the Deacon's Historia Langobardorum, when the Lombard king Alboin defeated the Gepids, the hereditary enemies of his people, in 567 AD, he then slew their new king Cunimund, fashioned a drinking-cup from his skull, and took his daughter Rosamund as a wife.

Khan Krum of the First Bulgarian Empire was said by Theophanes the Confessor, Joannes Zonaras, the Manasses Chronicle, and others, to have made a jeweled cup from the skull of the Byzantine emperor Nicephorus I (811 AD) after killing him in the Battle of Pliska.

The Kievan Rus' Primary Chronicle reports that the skull of Svyatoslav I of Kiev was made into a chalice by the Pecheneg Khan Kurya in 972 AD. He likely intended this as a compliment to Sviatoslav; sources report that Kurya and his wife drank from the skull and prayed for a son as brave as the deceased Rus warlord.

According to George Akropolites the skull of Baldwin I of Constantinople was made into a drinking cup by the Tsar Kaloyan of Bulgaria (c. 1205).

According to legend, after the pirate Blackbeard was killed and beheaded in 1718, his skull was made into a drinking cup.

In 19th-century Britain, the poet Lord Byron used a skull his gardener had found at Newstead Abbey as a drinking vessel. According to Byron,

There had been found by the gardener, in digging, a skull that had probably belonged to some jolly monk or friar of the Abbey, about the time it was demonasteried. Observing it to be of giant size, and in a perfect state of preservation, a strange fancy seized me of having it set and mounted as a drinking cup. I accordingly sent it to town, and it returned with a very high polish and of a mottled colour like tortoiseshell.

Byron even wrote a darkly witty drinking poem as if inscribed upon it, "Lines Inscribed upon a Cup Formed from a Skull". The cup, filled with claret, was passed around "in imitation of the Goths of old", among the Order of the Skull that Byron founded at Newstead, "whilst many a grim joke was cut at its expense", Byron recalled to Thomas Medwin.

== See also ==
- Noggin (cup)
