= Guksi =

Traditional drinking cup

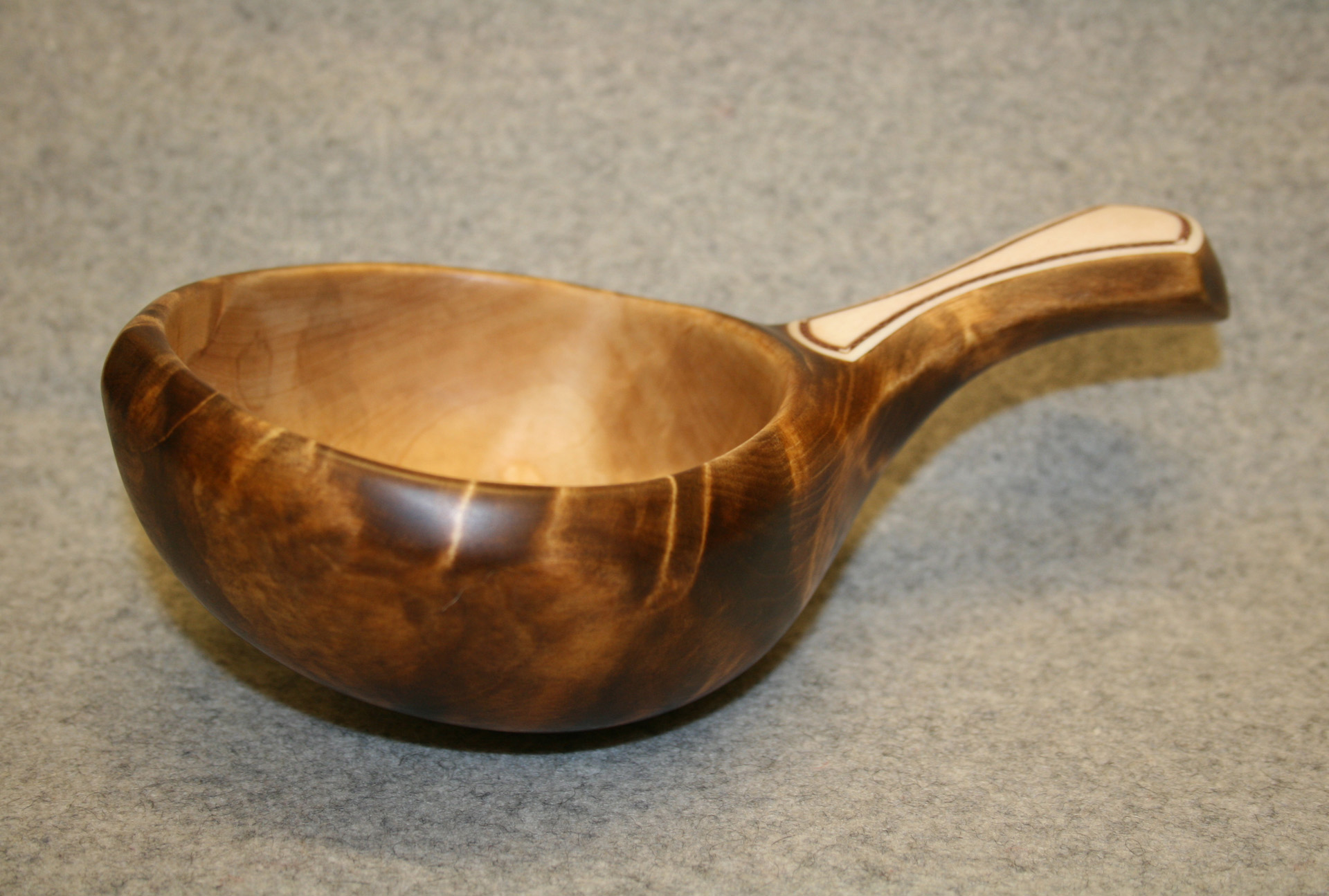
A guksi

Guksi or guksie (or Finnish: kuksa; Swedish: kåsa) is a type of drinking cup, traditionally duodji crafted by the Sami people of northern Scandinavia and Finland from carved birch burl.

== Manufacture ==
The burl is contoured to a rough shape, carefully dried to prevent the wood from cracking, then formed in accordance with the local traditions. Birch burl kuksas last longer than plain birch kuksas. Originally guksi, or kuksa, were widely used in Arctic areas as a personal drinking cup; a well-made guksi would last a lifetime.

== Maintenance ==
Guksi was traditionally only rinsed with clean water and dried with a cloth after use. No detergents are used, since many people believe that it will damage a guksi.

== Modern guksis ==
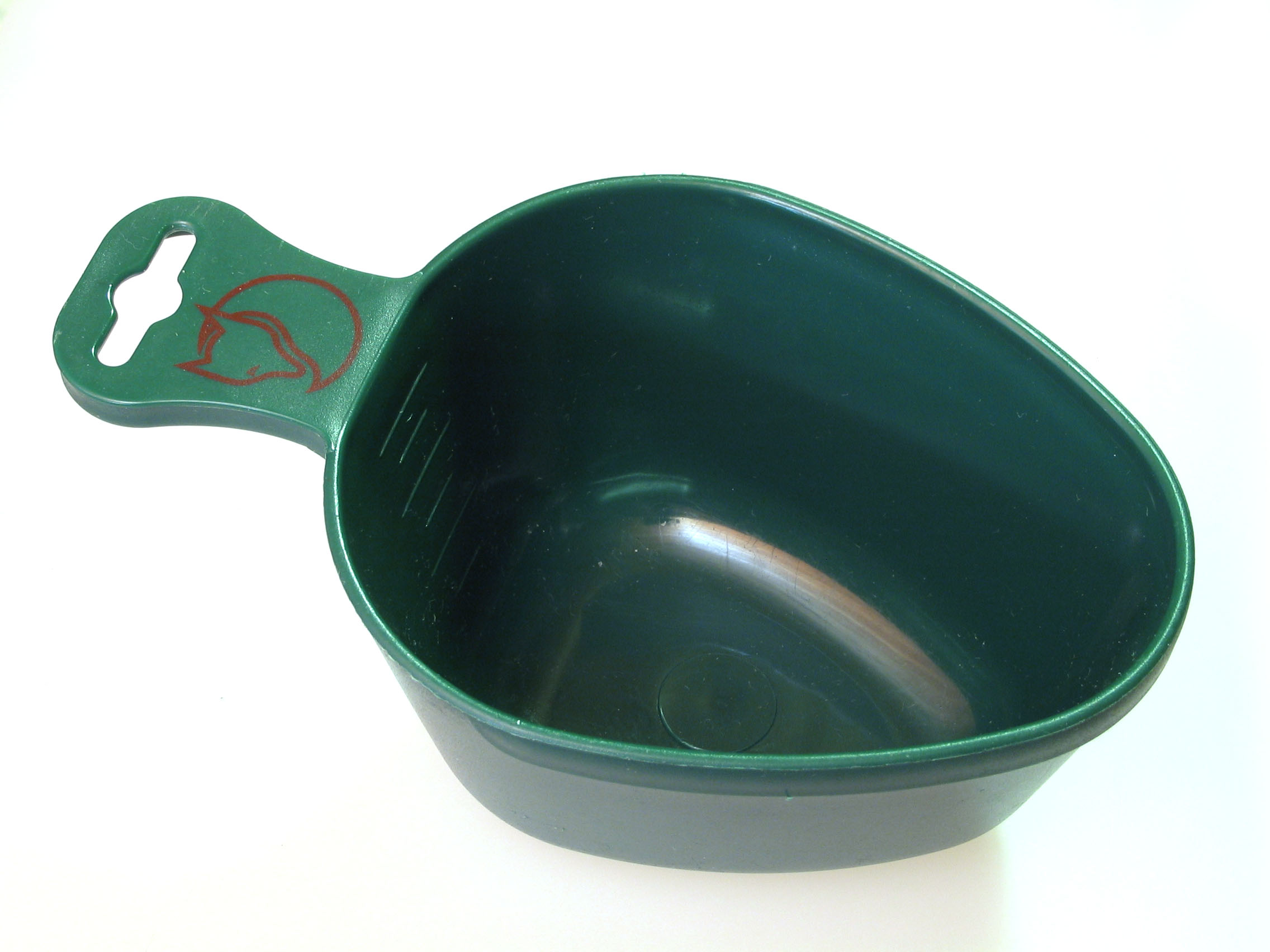
Modern plastic kåsa (or mug)

Today, a traditional guksi is difficult to find outside northern Scandinavia, partly because burls are seldom harvested in modern mechanized forestry. With the introduction of glass, ceramic and metal drinkingware, the skill of making such duodji artwork has become a pastime skill rather than the essential one as it was in the past. It is considered an advanced level whittling project. Nowadays it is also used for bushcraft. When used this way, it is carved by the person who is going to use it, or it is a gift from a friend.

== See also ==
- Noggin (cup)
