= Gough's Cave =

Cave and archaeological site in the United Kingdom

Coordinates: 51°16′53″N 2°45′51″W

Gough's cave
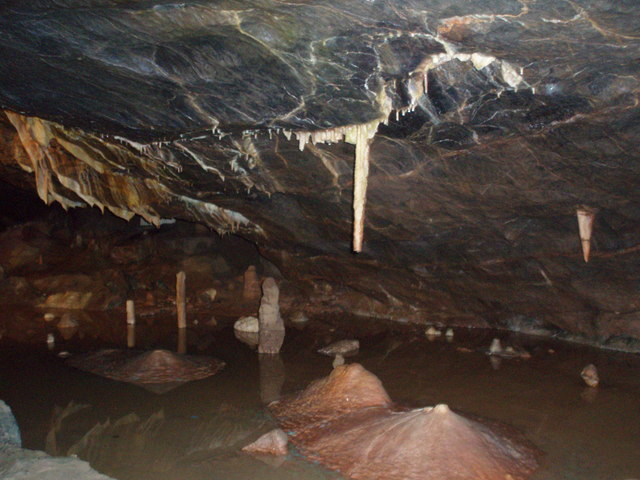
- Stalagmites and stalactites in Gough's cave
- Interactive map of Gough's cave
- Location: Cheddar
- Depth: 115 m (377 ft)
- Length: 3,405 m (11,171 ft)
- Discovery: 1892
- Geology: Limestone
- Access: Show cave open to the public; greater part by diving only
- Cave survey: University of Bristol Spelaeological Society
- Registry: Mendip Cave Registry

Gough's Cave (/ɡɒf/ GOF) is located in Cheddar Gorge on the Mendip Hills, in Cheddar, Somerset, England. The cave is 115 m (377 ft) deep and 3.405 km (2.12 mi) long and contains a variety of large chambers and rock formations. It contains the Cheddar Yeo, the largest underground river system in Britain. Archaeologically, the cave is known for a late Upper Paleolithic Magdalenian occupation around 14,700 years ago, evidenced by remains showing cannibalism, the production of skull cups, and the domestication of dogs, as well as for the considerably younger Mesolithic skeleton of Cheddar Man, dating to around 10,300 years ago.

== History ==
The initial sections of the cave, previously known as Sand Hole, were accessible prior to the 19th century. Between 1892 and 1898 a retired sea captain, Richard Cox Gough, who lived in Lion House in Cheddar, found, excavated and opened to the public further areas of the cave, up to Diamond Chamber, which is the end of the show cave today. Electric lighting was installed in the show caves in 1899.

The cave is susceptible to flooding often lasting for up to 48 hours, but in the Great Flood of 1968 the flooding lasted for three days.

The extensive flooded parts of the cave system were found and explored between 1985 and 1990.

== Access and description ==
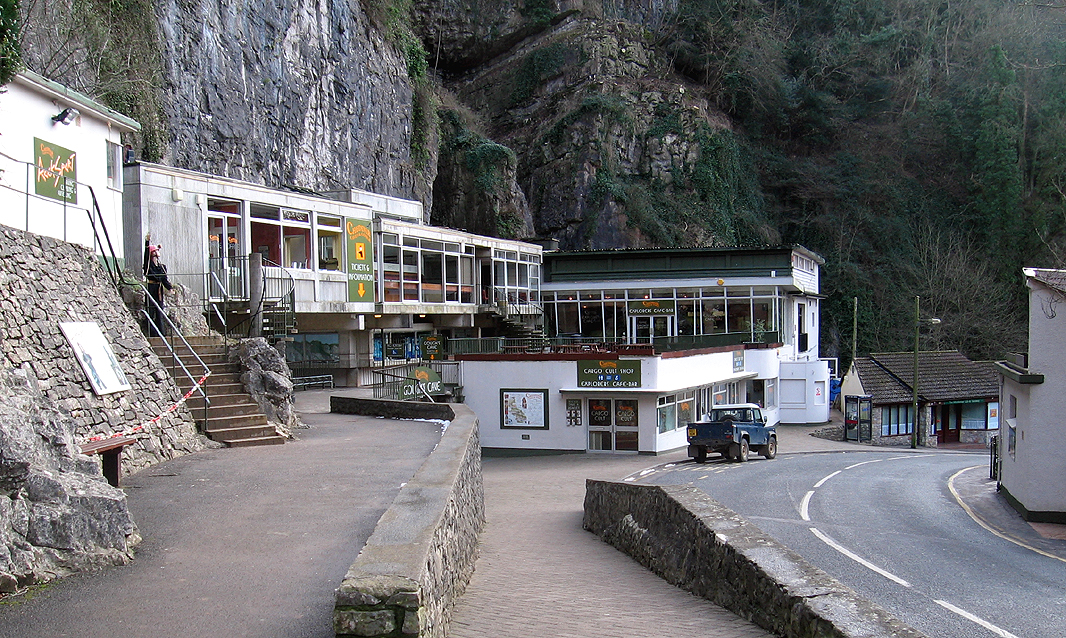
The entrance to Gough's Cave

The first 820 m (2,690 ft) of the cave are open to the public as a show cave, and this stretch contains most of the more spectacular formations. The greater part of the cave's length is made up of the river passage, which is accessible only by cave diving.

=== Beyond the show cave ===
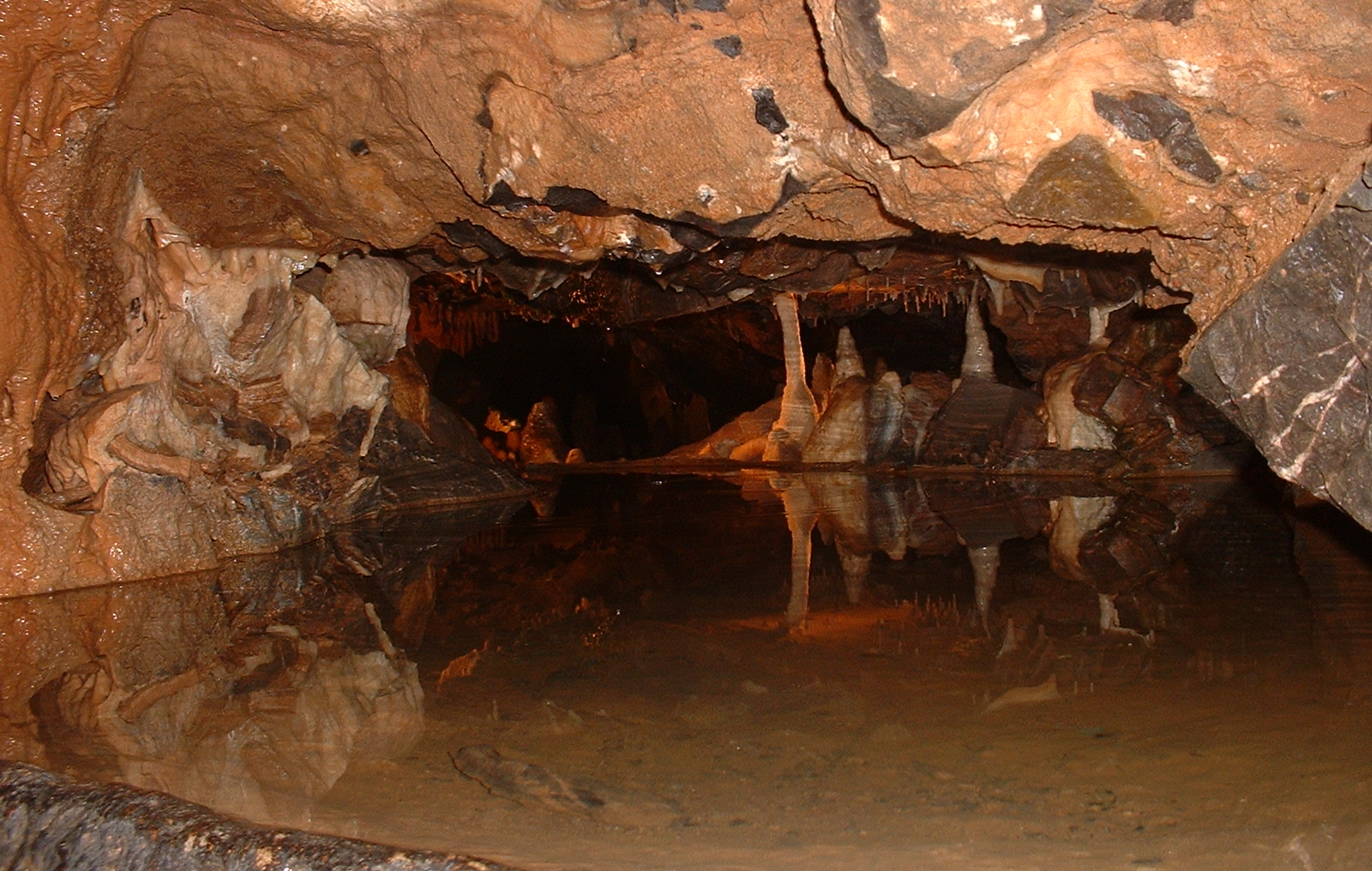
Alladdin's Cave, a chamber and mirror pool inside Gough's Cave

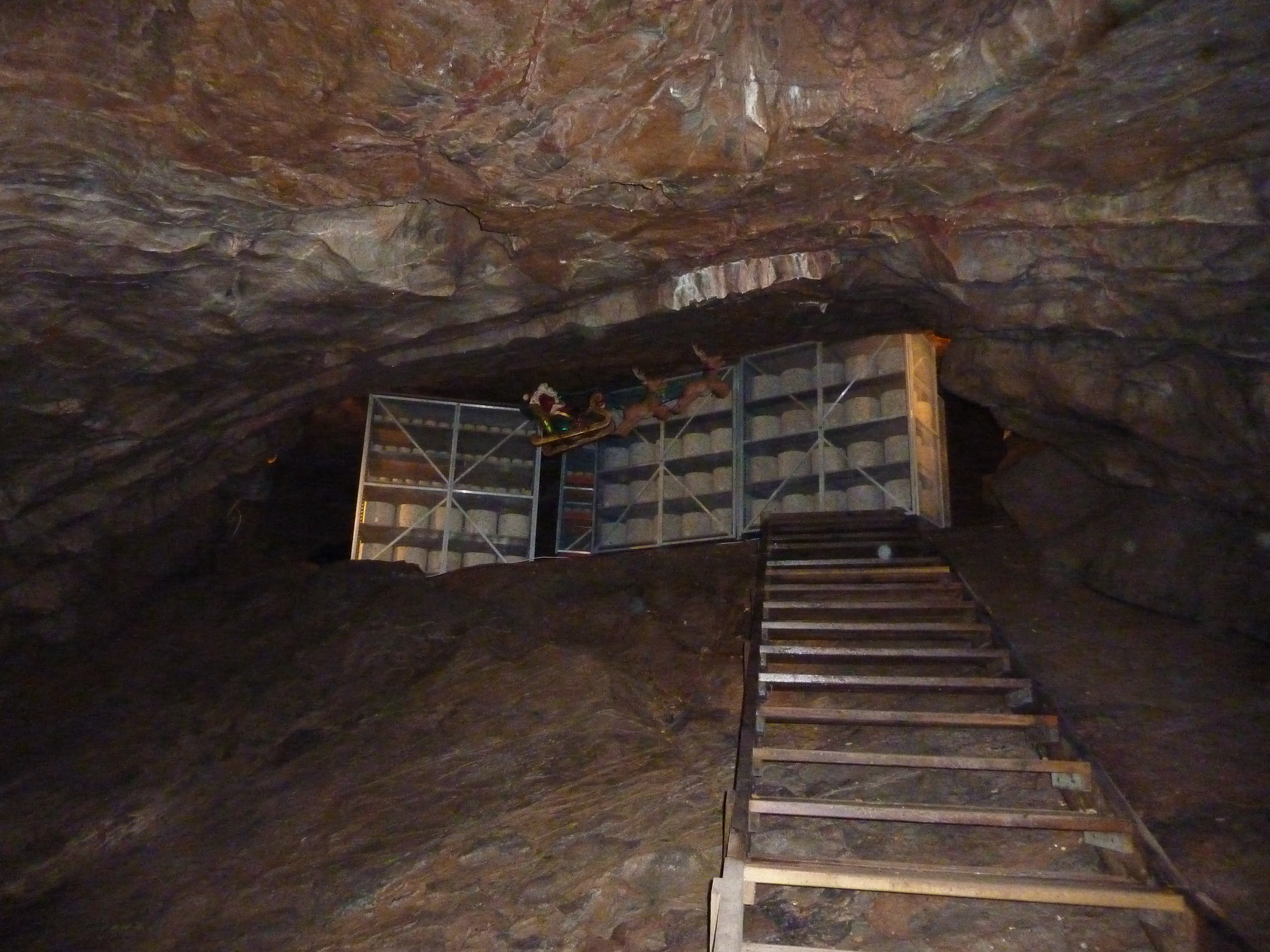
Cheddar cheese maturing in the cave

Gough's cave contains long stretches of completely flooded river passage. From a point relatively close to the areas of the cave open to the public, the cave-divers' descent into Sump 1a begins through a tight passage known as Dire Straits. The bottom of that passage opens into the river passage, which is several metres across. This has been explored for 335 m (1,099 ft) downstream, whilst upstream a dive of 150 m (490 ft) brings the diver out in a 20 m (66 ft) long chamber named Lloyd Hall (which can now also be reached by an alternative, dry, route).

Another dive of 140 m (460 ft) through Sump 1b, finishing with an ascent through a rising passage, leads to another chamber, 60 m (197 ft) long and 25 m (82 ft) wide at its widest point, and full of large boulders, called Bishop's Palace. This chamber is the largest chamber currently found in the Cheddar caves. Further on, three sump pools (named the Duck Ponds) lead to Sump 2 which is about 27 m (89 ft) deep at its lowest point and 150 m (492 ft) long.

Air is again reached at Sheppard's Crook, which is followed by Sump 3. This sump is 55 m (180 ft) deep and at its bottommost point is about 30 m (98 ft) below sea level. Following Sump 3, a wide ascending passage continues for 370 m (1,214 ft) before reaching an impassable blockage, still below the water's surface.

Sump	Length of dive	Depth	Emerging into
Sump 1a	150 m (492 ft)	18 m (59 ft)	Lloyd Hall
Sump 1b	140 m (459 ft)	?	Bishop's Palace
Sump 2	150 m (492 ft) with airbells	27 m (89 ft)	Sheppard's Crook
Sump 3	370 m (1,214 ft)	55 m (180 ft)	Passage blocked

== Magdalenian occupation ==
The cave contained skeletal remains of animals and of humans, indicating that the cave was occupied for a relatively brief period by Magdalenian peoples towards the end of the last ice age, when conditions had become warm enough for humans to return to Britain after northern Europe became uninhabitable around the Last Glacial Maximum. A 2009 study concluded that the occupation almost certainly took place between 14,970 and 14,640 years Before Present, around the time of the onset of the Bølling–Allerød Interstadial, though a later 2025 study suggested the occupation may have actually occurred a few centuries prior. Both human and animals remains show cut-marks and breakage consistent with de-fleshing and eating. Skull fragments represent from 5 to 7 humans, including a young child of about 3 years and two adolescents. The brain cases appear to have been prepared into skull cups to be used as drinking cups or containers, a tradition found in other Magdalenian sites across Europe.

The remains are currently in the Natural History Museum in London, with a replica in the Cheddar Man and the Cannibals Museum in the Gorge. Other human remains have also been found in the cave.

Upper Palaeolithic stone tools found in the cave are a mixture of late Magdalenian and Federmesser type. Evidence has been found for "soft hammers" of bone being used to work stone, as well as teeth being used as "pressure flakers" for fine shaping. A perforated baton, made of reindeer antler, was found in Gough's Cave. Such perforated artifacts have an unclear purpose but several uses have been proposed, including the production of rope. A "bevel-based rod" made of woolly mammoth ivory has also been found.

=== Genetics ===
In 2022 nuclear and mitochondrial DNA from a female found in the cave were analysed. Like human remains from other Magdalenian sites, her genome is affiliated with the ~19,000–14,000-year-old Goyet Q2 genetic cluster.

=== Diet and environment ===
Isotopic analysis of the remains showed a diet consisting of terrestrial herbivores such as red deer, aurochs and wild horse, with remains of red deer and wild horse being the predominant animal remains found in the cave. The environment surrounding the cave around the time of the Magdalenian occupation is thought to have been steppe-like, as indicated by remains of species such as the saiga antelope, with animals such as ptarmigan, Arctic fox, Norway lemming, Tundra vole and Arctic lemming indicating a relatively cold climate.

=== Treatment of corpses ===
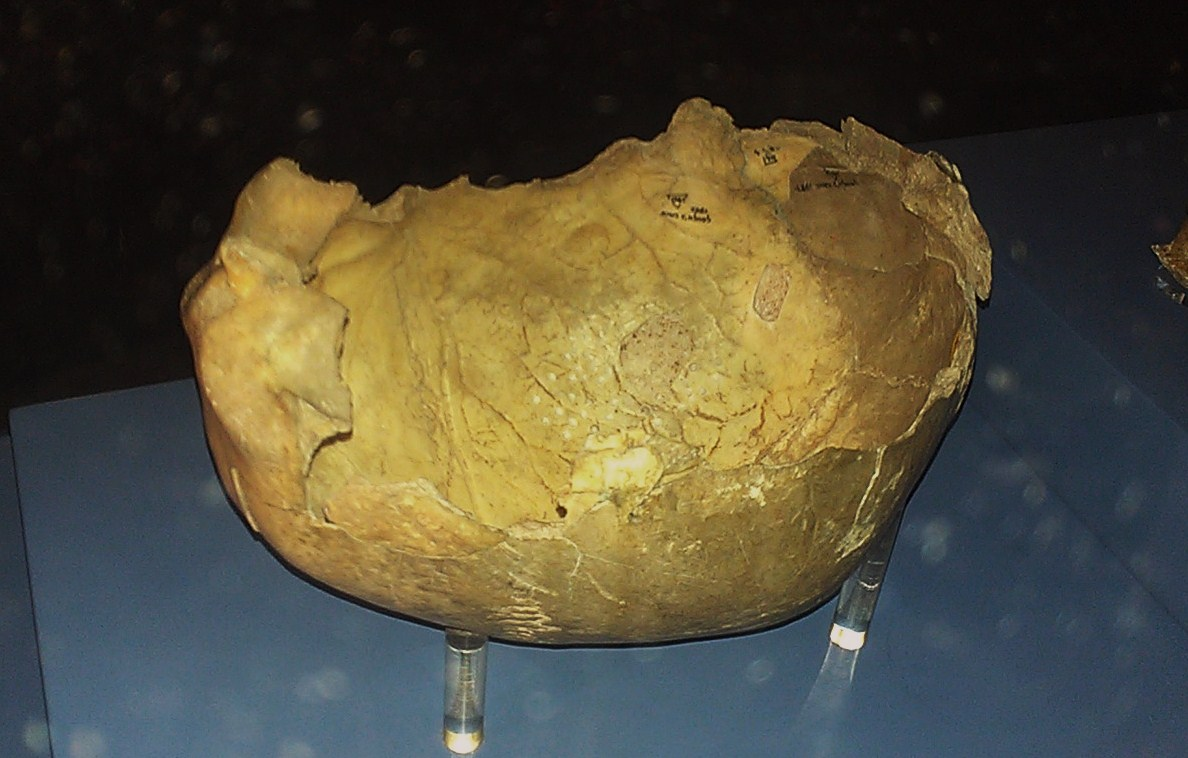
Skull cup from Gough's cave

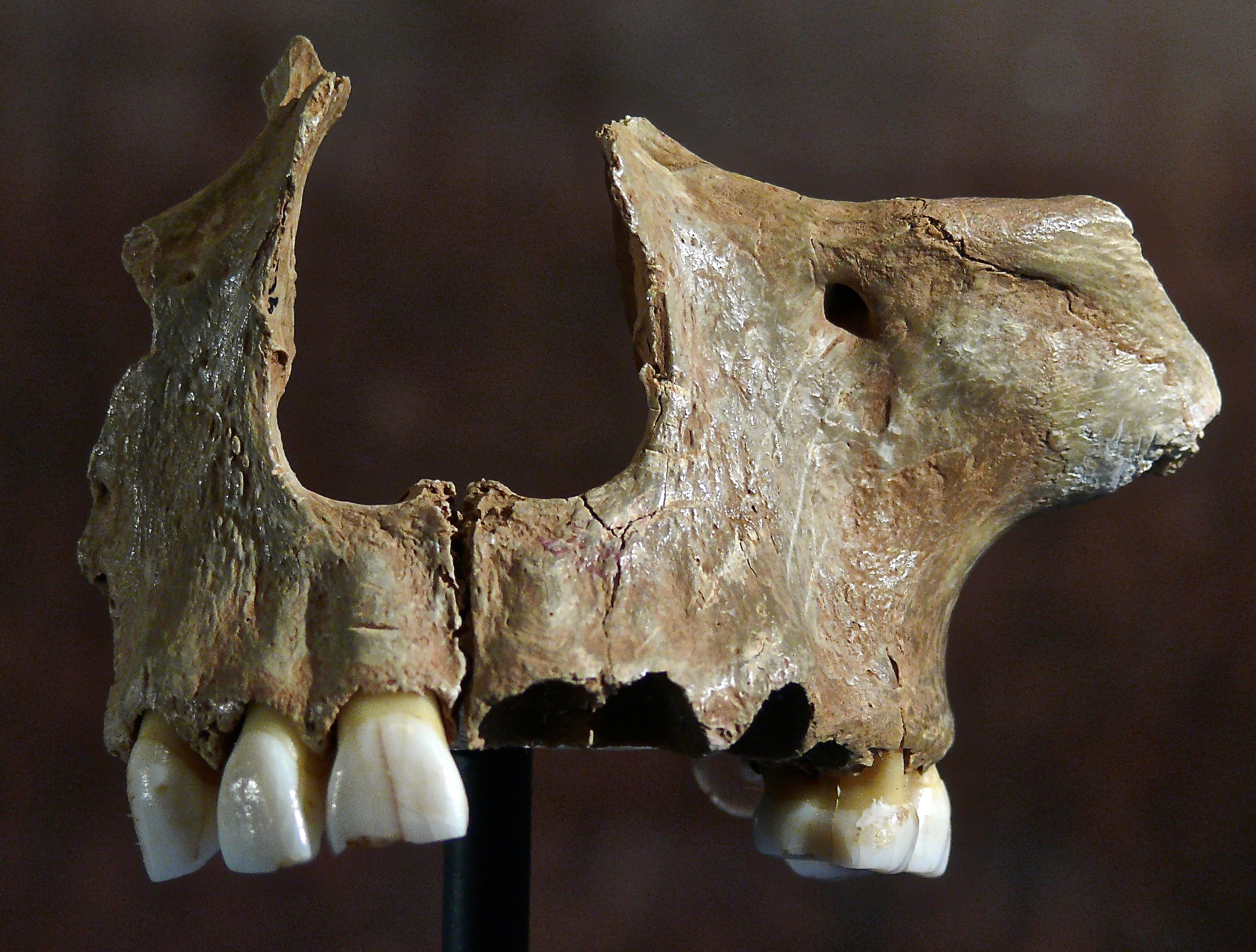
Fractured part of a human skull from the Magdalenian occupation of Gough's Cave

The Magdalenian human skulls found at Gough's cave were carefully processed using stone tools to produce "skull cups", likely used as ritual drinking cups or bowls. 3D microscopy analysis of the bones also shows that the human remains had been systematically butchered and defleshed using the same tools and techniques as used on animal bones. Human remains in the cave also show gnawing marks made by human teeth, as well as being fragmented probably to extract marrow, which have been generally taken as clear evidence for the practice of cannibalism. Evidence of similar cannibalistic practices have been found at a dozen other Magdalenian sites across Europe, including Grotte du Placard, Courbet Cave and Isturitz in France, Brillenhöhle and Hohle Fels in Germany and Maszycka Cave in Poland. The butchery and consumption of human remains were likely undertaken as a group activity. It has been proposed that the Magdalenian peoples inhabiting the cave (as well as other Magdalenians) were engaging in ritual endocannibalism, consuming members of the group's own community as a funerary act following their deaths.

=== Dogs ===
A canine jawbone associated with the Magdalenian occupation, dated ~15-14,000 years Before Present, was genetically sequenced in a study published in 2026 and shown to be one of the oldest known domestic dogs and closely related to other Palaeolithic dogs such as the famous Bonn–Oberkassel dog as well as to those found at the Pınarbaşı site in Turkey, suggesting that dogs were widespread in late Upper Palaeolithic Europe. The specimen had been found in the 1920s but long considered an unremarkable wolf specimen.

== Cheddar Man ==
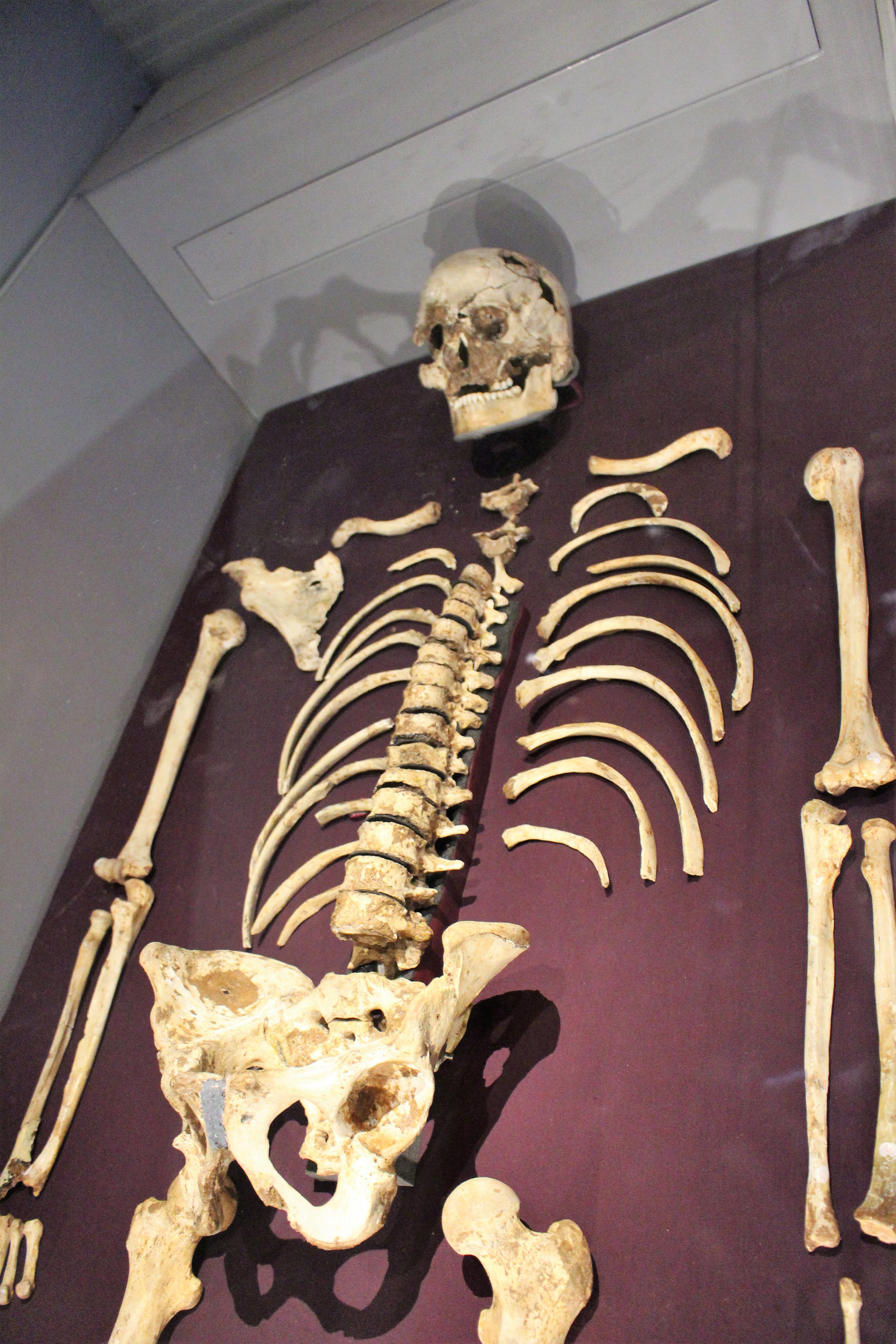
Skeleton of Cheddar Man

In 1903 the remains of a human male, since named Cheddar Man, were found a short distance inside Gough's Cave. He is Britain's oldest complete human skeleton, having been dated to the Mesolithic, approximately 10,564–9,915 calibrated years Before Present. His genetic markers suggested (based on their associations in modern populations whose phenotypes are known) that he probably had green eyes, lactose intolerance, dark curly or wavy hair and, less certainly, dark to very dark skin. Further genetic analysis shows that he is part of the Western Hunter-Gatherer population and not closely related to the much earlier Magdalenian individuals found in the same cave. About 85% of his ancestry can be modelled as coming from the ~14,000–7,000-year-old Villabruna genetic cluster and only c. 15% from the Goyet Q2 cave cluster that is associated with Magdalenian culture.

== See also ==
- Caves of the Mendip Hills
