= Cheddar Man =

Prehistoric human remains found in England

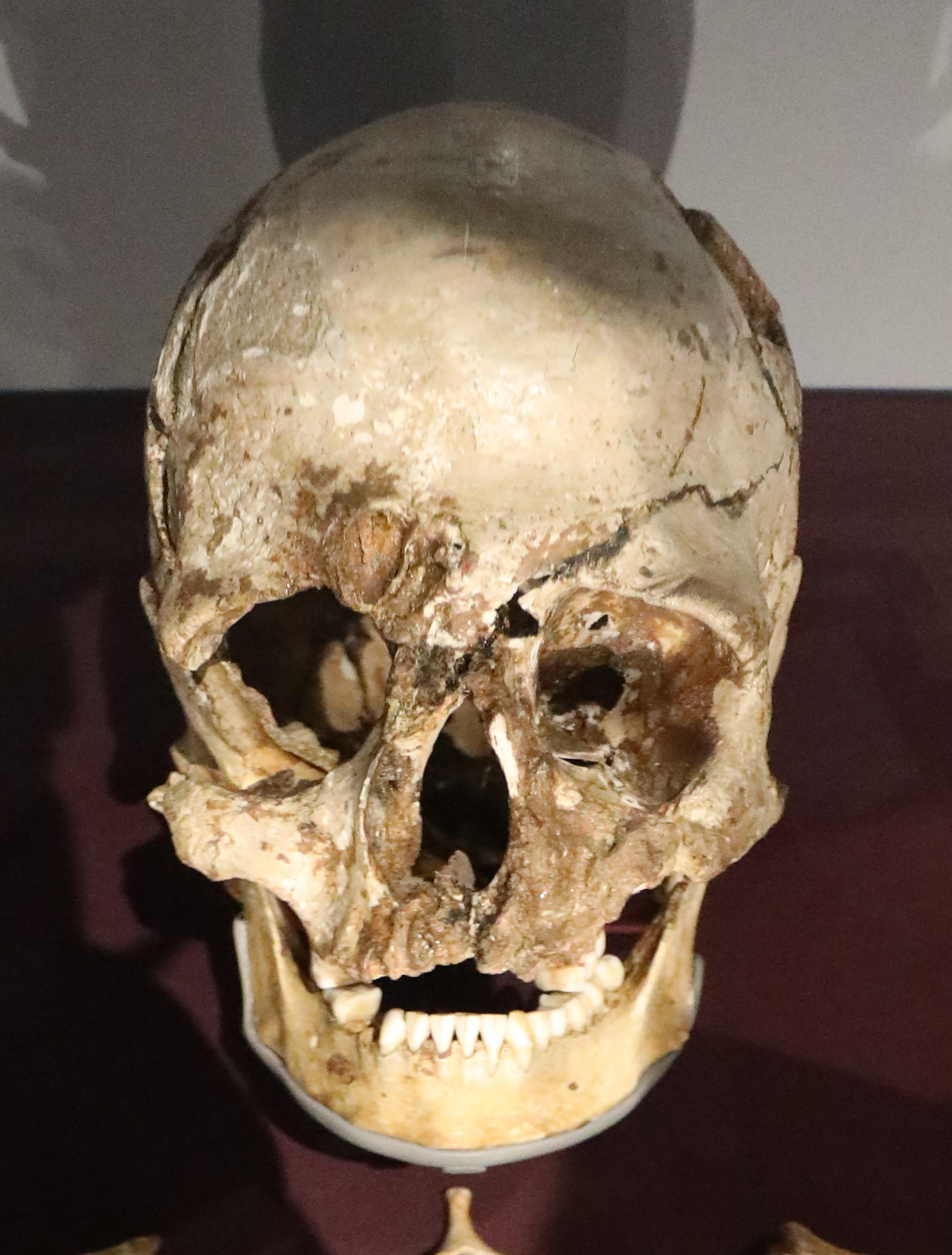
- Cheddar Man's skull
- Died: c. 8300 BC (aged approximately 18–23)
- Body discovered: December 1903; Gough's Cave, Cheddar Gorge, Somerset, England
- Resting place: Natural History Museum, London (on loan from the Longleat Estate)
- Era: Mesolithic
- Known for: Oldest nearly complete human skeleton found in Great Britain
- Height: Approximately 166 cm (5 ft 5 in)

Cheddar Man is the name given to the nearly complete skeleton of a Mesolithic-era hunter-gatherer discovered in December 1903 in Gough's Cave, in Cheddar Gorge, Somerset, England. He lived around 8300 BC, approximately 10,300 years ago, and probably died in his early twenties. His remains constitute the oldest nearly complete human skeleton found in Great Britain.

The skeleton was uncovered during drainage work near the cave entrance. Its position has been interpreted as evidence of a deliberate burial with the limbs bent, although the circumstances of deposition remain debated. His cause of death is unknown. Skull damage once considered evidence of fatal injuries is now thought more likely to have occurred after death, while a lesion above his right eye socket suggests a possible bone infection.

Ancient DNA analysis indicates that he belonged to the Western European hunter-gatherer population. Genetic evidence suggests that he most likely had blue-green eyes, dark brown or black hair, and dark or dark-to-black skin, although these predictions are limited by incomplete genetic data. He lacked the genetic adaptation associated with the ability to digest milk in adulthood. His ancestry and reconstructed appearance have attracted widespread public attention and debate about British prehistory, race and national identity.

His skeleton is displayed in the Human Evolution Gallery at the Natural History Museum in London, on loan from the Longleat Estate. Beside it is a facial reconstruction created in 2018 by Dutch artists Adrie and Alfons Kennis using skull scans and genetic evidence.

== Discovery ==
The individual who became known as Cheddar Man was discovered in December 1903 in Gough's Cave, in Cheddar Gorge, Somerset, in south-west England. The cave had been developed as a tourist attraction by Richard Cox Gough and his family during the late 19th century. Excavation of its downward-sloping entrance led to regular flooding after heavy rain, and Gough began digging a drainage trench to carry the water away. After his death in February 1902, management of the cave passed to his widow, Frances, and their eldest son, Arthur.

The drainage work continued. In December 1903, workmen extending the trench into a recess near the cave entrance uncovered a human skeleton beneath a layer of stalagmite. The recess later became known as Cheddar Man Fissure. The discovery was unexpected, and some information about the original position of the remains was lost during their recovery. The workmen removed the skull before the skeleton could be properly recorded.

Soon afterwards, geologist and physician Henry Nathaniel Davies visited the cave. In April 1904, four months after the discovery, he published the first detailed account of the skeleton and how it had been found. Davies recorded that the skull had lain slightly lower than the pelvis and legs. The legs were drawn up, while one arm was bent with the hand near the back of the head.

== Condition ==
Cheddar Man was found as a nearly complete skeleton. Most of the major bones were present, including the skull and much of the skeleton of the torso, arms and legs, although some bones were missing or damaged. No soft tissue survived; what remained was an unusually complete skeleton.

== Grave goods and associated items ==
No objects can be securely identified as grave goods, or objects deliberately placed with Cheddar Man's body. The only other find considered certainly associated with the skeleton is a lower canine tooth from a wildcat (Felis silvestris). It is not known whether the tooth was deliberately placed with the body.

Numerous worked flints were also recovered from the area of the fissure. Early accounts associated some of these finds with Cheddar Man, but material from different periods occurs in the deposits at Gough's Cave, and the flints cannot be securely linked to the skeleton.

Part of a perforated antler baton was also found during the 1903 excavations in the Cheddar Man Fissure and was reported as having been found near the skeleton. The precise circumstances of its discovery are uncertain, and its association with Cheddar Man was later disputed.

Later research places the baton in the much earlier Magdalenian occupation of Gough's Cave, rather than the Mesolithic period in which Cheddar Man lived. A fragment of the same baton, found elsewhere in the cave in 1929–1930, came from deposits rich in Magdalenian remains. The baton therefore cannot be considered a grave good belonging to Cheddar Man.

== Scientific analysis ==
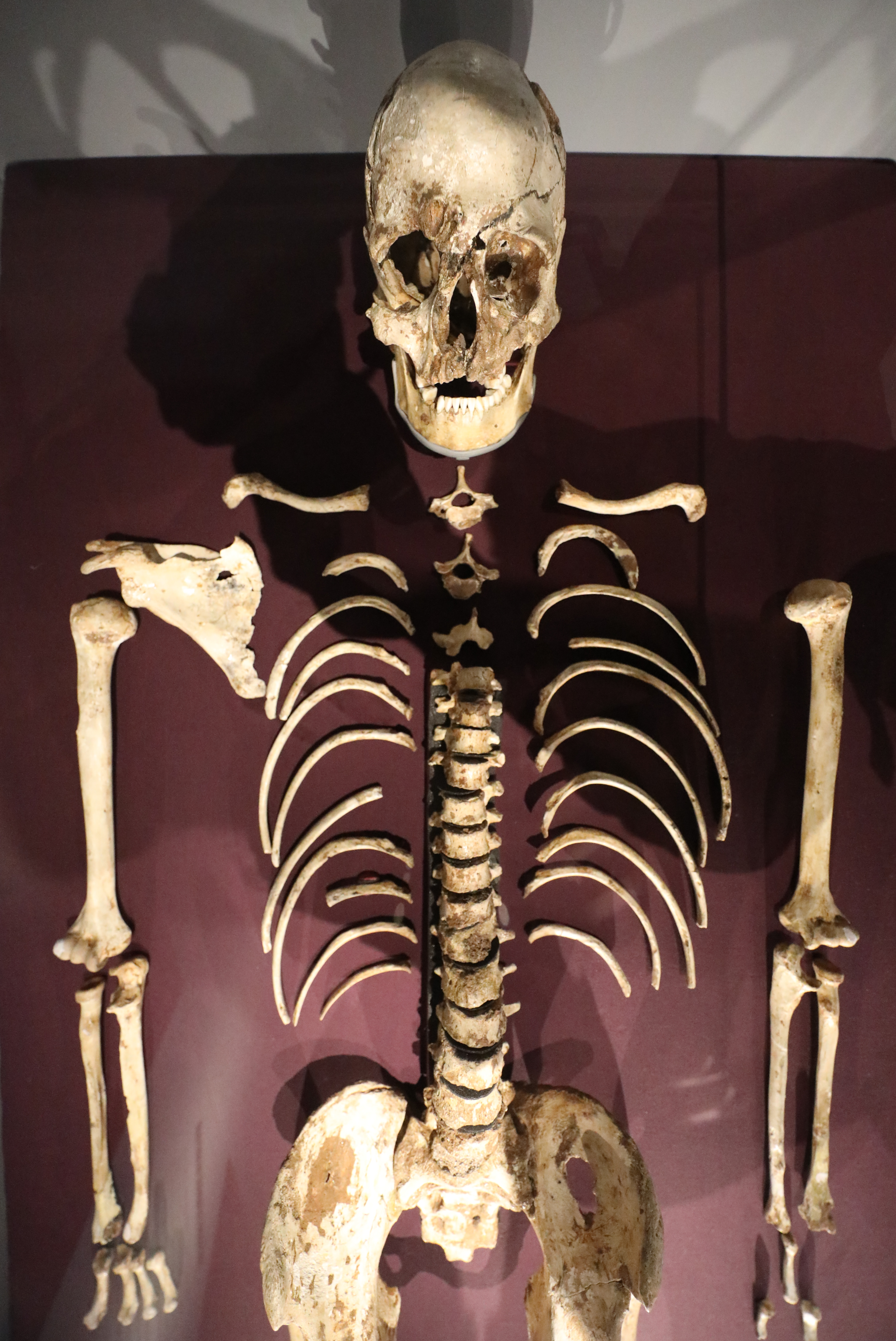
The upper body of the Cheddar Man

=== Body and health ===
The near-complete skeleton was that of an adult male who probably died in his early twenties. Cheddar Man was relatively short compared to modern Europeans, with an estimated stature of around 166 centimetres (5 ft 5 in), and weighing around 66 kilograms (146 lb). Proportionally, he is in most respects similar to modern Europeans, and may be described as 'cold-adapted', but with a high crural index (thigh-length–to–leg-length ratio) which is much higher than the modern European average and higher even than the modern sub-Saharan African average, and a high tibia-length–to–trunk-height ratio similar to modern North Africans.

=== Dating ===
Cheddar Man has been directly radiocarbon dated on two separate occasions, giving calibrated dates of 8540–7990 BC and 8470–8230 BC.

=== Origins ===
Cheddar Man belonged to the Western hunter-gatherer (WHG) population that dominated most of Western Europe during the Mesolithic. Around 4000 BC, they were replaced by Neolithic farmers who emigrated from the Continent. The Neolithic people had an average of 10% ancestry from Western hunter-gatherers, but almost all of this ancestry came from Continental populations, rather than Britain's original Mesolithic inhabitants.

Nuclear DNA was extracted from the petrous part of the temporal bone by a team from the Natural History Museum in 2018. Around 85% of his ancestry can be modelled as coming from the Late Upper Paleolithic Villabruna genetic cluster, which forms the great majority of ancestry of Western Hunter Gatherers, with the remaining c. 15% deriving from the Goyet Q2 cave cluster associated with the Late Upper Palaeolithic Magdalenian culture. He is not closely related to the earlier Magdalenian individuals found in the same cave, whose ancestry is entirely from the Goyet cluster.

=== Phenotype ===
Analysis of genetic markers, although limited by low sequencing coverage, suggests (based on their associations in modern populations whose phenotypes are known) that he most likely had intermediate (blue-green) eye colour, dark brown or black hair, and dark or dark-to-black skin, with no derived allele for lactase persistence. These features are typical of the Western European population of the time. (Note: These predictions were obtained using a multinomial logistic regression model based on a panel of 36 carefully selected SNPs with a low sensitivity of 0.26 for classifying intermediate skin (compared to 0.99 and 0.90 for white and black skin, respectively). The accuracy of the model used could be further improved with "additional (but currently unknown) SNP predictors once identified via future GWAS".) Unlike Farming populations outside the Tropics, who became lighter-skinned over time because they do not get enough vitamin D from their diet, western hunter-gatherers retained their dark skin because they got enough vitamin D from foods such as oily fish. The later immigrations of Early European Farmers and Bell Beaker groups introduced traits of brown eyes, lactose tolerance, and light skin to western Europe.

=== Uniparental haplogroups ===
Cheddar Man's Y-DNA belongs to I-S2524*, a descendant subclade of haplogroup I2a. I-L38, a primary subclade of I-S2524, has been found in Iron Age males from Denmark. The broader I2a is still extant in males of modern Britain and other parts of Europe.

The mitochondrial DNA of Cheddar Man was assigned to haplogroup U5b1 by a Natural History Museum study in 2018 using next generation sequencing. Some 65% of western European Mesolithic hunter-gatherers had haplogroup U5; today it is widely distributed, at lower frequencies, across western Eurasia and northern Africa. In 1996, Bryan Sykes of the University of Oxford first sequenced the mitochondrial DNA from one of Cheddar Man's molars as U5a using PCR testing. The difference between the older result and the 2018 Natural History Museum result was attributed to the use of older PCR technology and possible contamination.

== Death ==
=== Cause of death ===
Cheddar Man's cause of death remains uncertain. Damage to the left side of his skull and upper jaw was initially interpreted as evidence of potentially fatal injuries. Later examination by anthropologists Louise Humphrey and Chris Stringer suggested that this damage more likely occurred after death. Their 2002 study also identified a lesion above his right eye socket consistent with an infection, possibly osteomyelitis, an infection of the bone. This could have developed from an infected sinus or an injury, but has not been established as the cause of his death.

=== Deposition ===
Cheddar Man was recovered from sediment in a narrow fissure inside Gough's Cave. Whether his body was deliberately buried or became covered by natural deposits has been debated. An early account suggested that he had drowned accidentally, while later researchers interpreted the position and arrangement of his remains as evidence of burial.

In 1975, researcher E. K. Tratman proposed that the body had first been exposed elsewhere, allowing much of the flesh to decay or be removed, before the bones were gathered and buried in a crouched position. However, a review by palaeoanthropologist Silvia M. Bello and colleagues, published in 2025, reported no evidence of cut marks or deliberate modification of Cheddar Man's remains after death. They considered the most likely explanation to be a primary burial, in which the complete body was placed directly in the cave with the limbs bent.

His solitary burial contrasts with the communal burials known from other Mesolithic caves in the region. At Aveline's Hole, approximately 1.6 kilometres (0.99 miles) away, the remains of about 50 people were deposited over a period of roughly 100–200 years.

== Public reception ==
Soon after the discovery of the skeleton, Cheddar Man became part of a discourse of British nationalism and cultural heritage, with an initially proposed age of 40,000–80,000 years. The specimen was heralded by some as the 'first Englishman'.

The analysis of Cheddar Man's mitochondrial DNA by Bryan Sykes in 1996 was broadcast on a regional television programme in the UK, Once Upon a Time in the West. The programme emphasised the connection between Cheddar Man and Adrian Targett, a history teacher from a local school, both of whom belonged to mitochondrial DNA haplogroup U5, although this cannot demonstrate a direct connection between Cheddar Man and this individual, and many people with the same mtDNA haplogroup could probably be found even within the local area. The programme generated coverage in national and international media, which focused mainly on the supposed relationship between Cheddar Man and the local history teacher, and failed to emphasise that mitochondrial DNA is only passed on through the mother, and makes up only a small proportion of an individual's genome.

In 2018, the publication of the genetics study by Brace et al. and subsequent facial reconstruction of a dark-skinned and blue-eyed Cheddar Man resulted in widespread media coverage. This coverage again described Cheddar Man as the "first Brit" (despite older remains of modern humans being known from Great Britain). Public discourse surrounding the reconstruction of Cheddar Man heavily revolved around the themes of immigration, national identity, race, and Brexit. Some saw Cheddar Man's predicted dark skin colour as a helpful counter to anti-immigration arguments, while others claimed it to be fake news or a piece of left-wing propaganda.

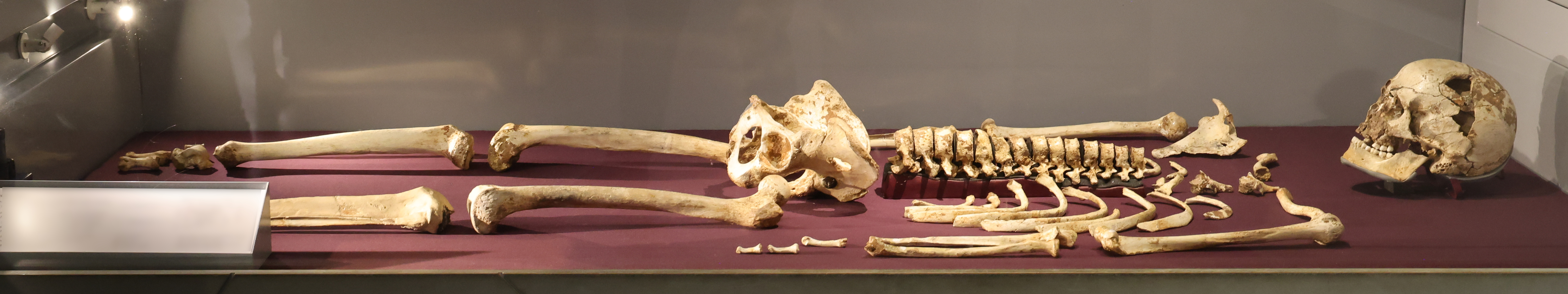
Cheddar Man's skeleton viewed from the side

== Exhibition and reconstruction ==
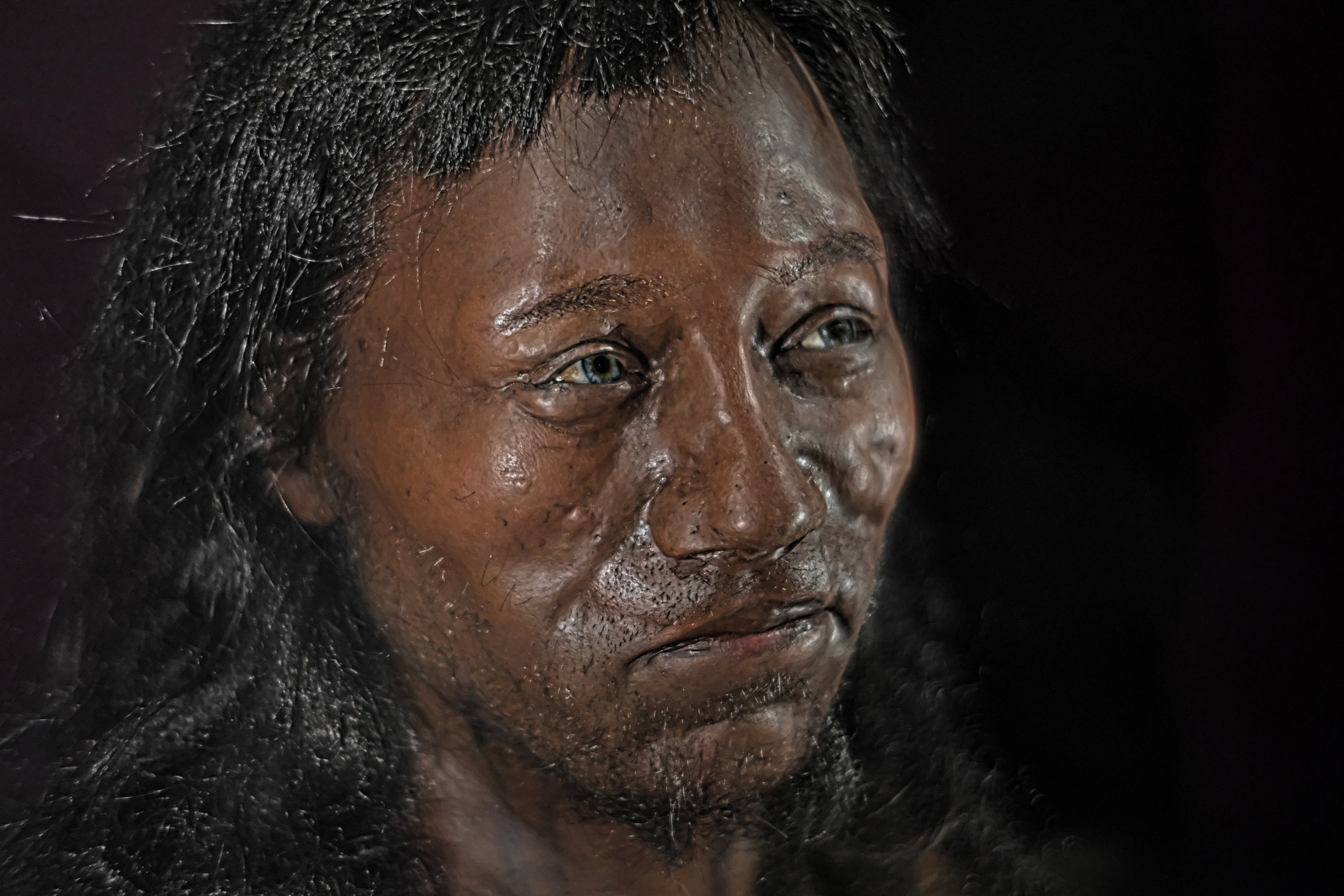
Facial reconstruction of Cheddar Man, created from a three-dimensional scan of his skull and genetic evidence about his pigmentation.

Cheddar Man's skeleton is displayed in the Human Evolution Gallery at the Natural History Museum in London, on loan from the Longleat Estate. Beside the remains is a facial reconstruction created in 2018 by Dutch artists and reconstruction specialists Adrie and Alfons Kennis.

The artists took measurements of his skeleton and worked from a three-dimensional scan of his skull. The scan was used to print a model of the skull, providing a physical base on which to build the face. They combined the skull's shape with estimates of soft-tissue thickness, while ancient DNA analysis provided evidence about his likely skin pigmentation, eye colour and hair colour. The resulting reconstruction depicts him with dark skin, blue-green eyes and dark hair.

== See also ==
- Boxgrove
- Genetic history of the British Isles
- List of human evolution fossils
- List of prehistoric structures in Great Britain
- Paviland
