= Duodji =

Traditional Saami handicraft

Duodji is a traditional cultural Sami handicraft. Some examples include knives, cases, women's bags, wooden cups, and articles of clothing. Duodji items are intended to be primarily functional and were made to be used in an everyday work environment, but may also incorporate artistic elements.

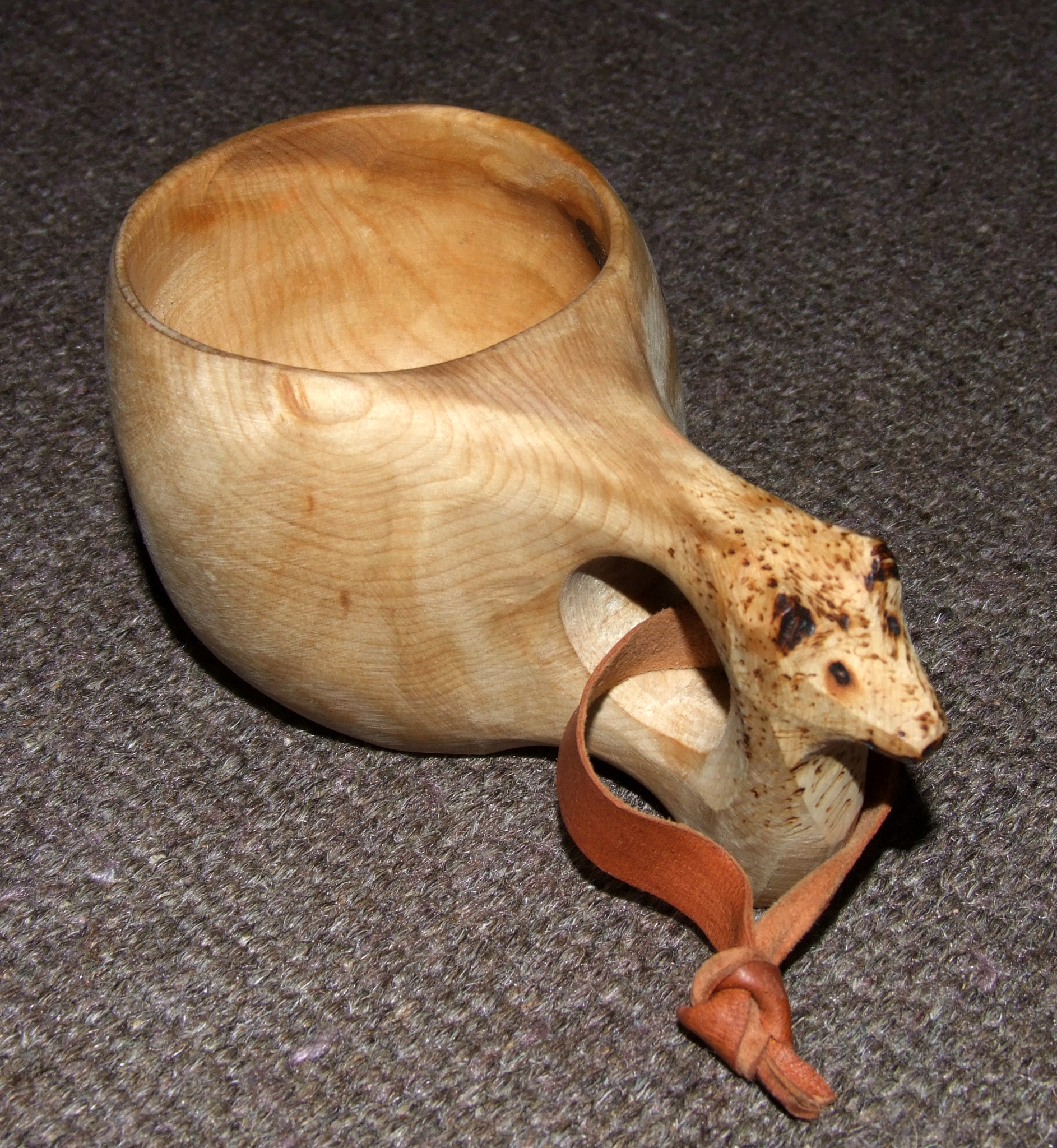
Drinking cup (guksi) also used for bushcraft

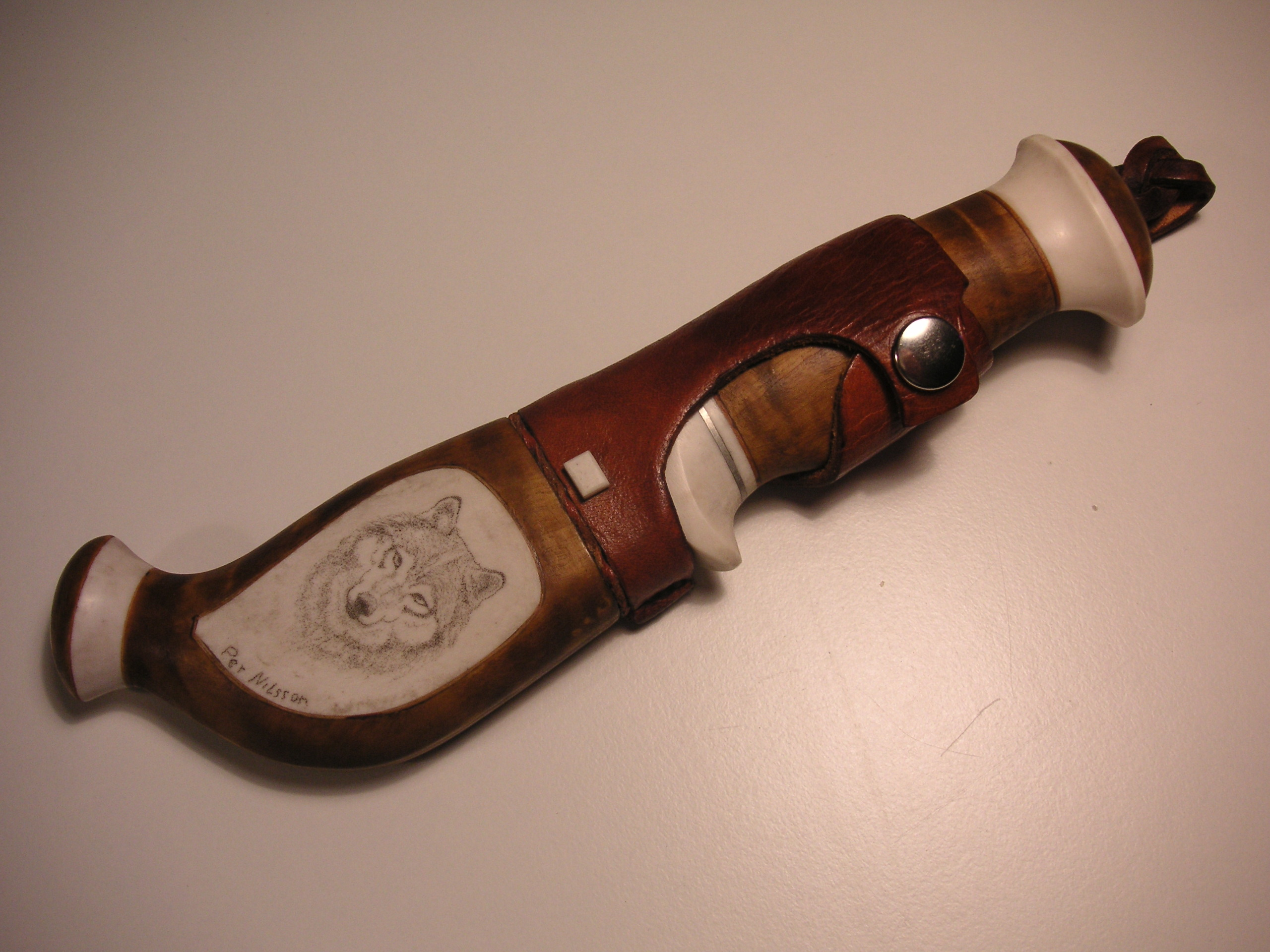
A small Sámi knife (decorative picture not traditional)

== Craft ==
Traditionally, Sami handicraft was divided into two sub-groups: men's and women's handicraft. Men used mostly wood and antlers as well as other bones from reindeer when crafting, while women used leather and roots. The traditional Sami colors are red, green, blue, and yellow.

Duodji artists are still active in Sápmi and still carry on the traditions of the duodji. Although there have been changes in the traditional duodji, today they are considered valuable pieces of art by collectors from all over the world. Some modern duodji artists are Olov Svonni, Martin Kuorak, Anders Sunna, Lars Pirak, Per Isak Juuso, Gunvor Guttorm and Per Olof Utsi.

== Gákti ==
The traditional regalia, the gákti, is of special cultural importance and is mainly used for weddings, funerals, confirmations, and other cultural events. The gákti's appearance differs from place to place, and it tends to be longer in southern Sápmi than in the north. Traditionally, leather, sinews, and wool were used to make the gákti. Today, however, both velvet and silk can be used.

== Gallery ==
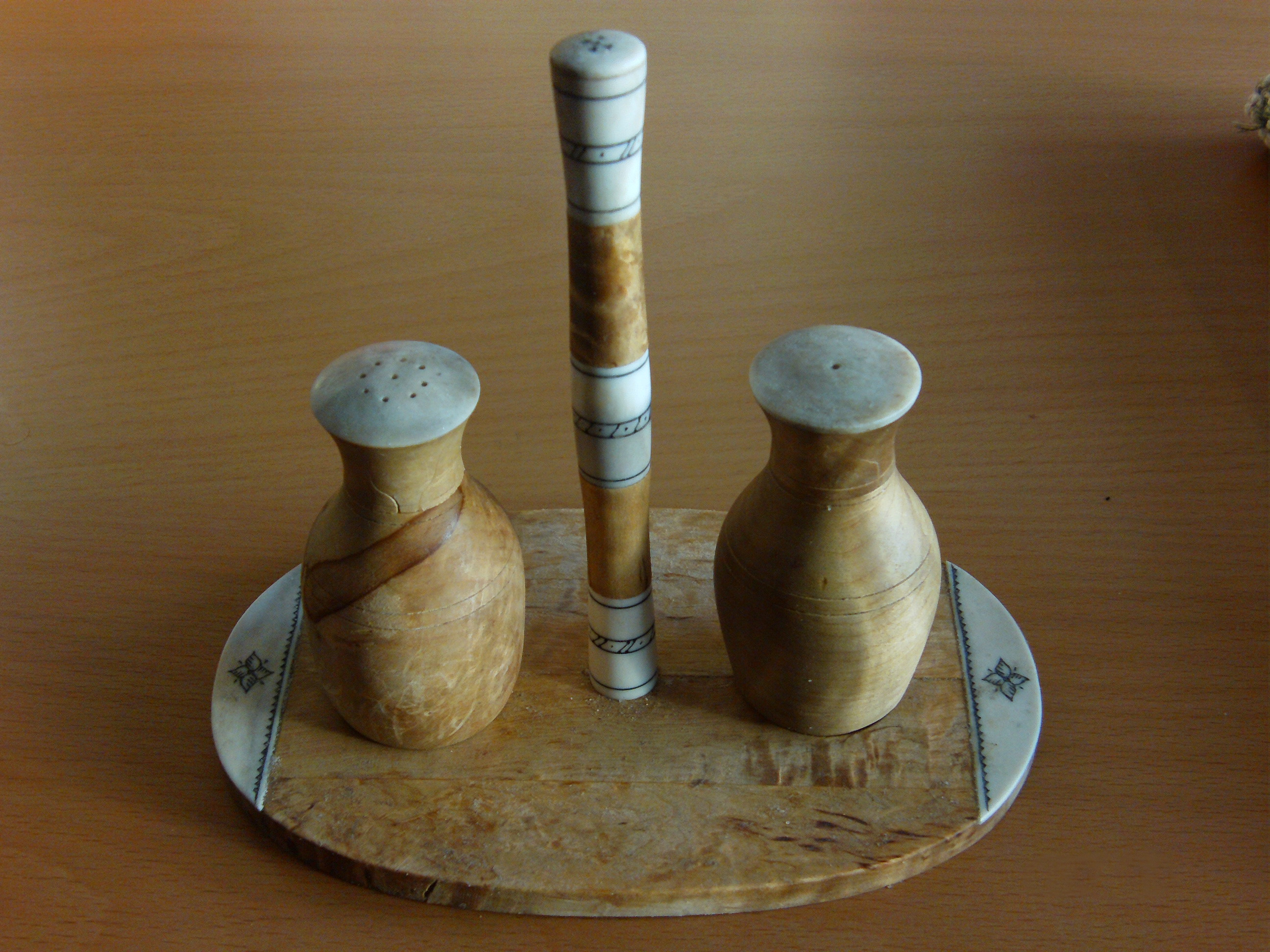
Two salt cellars

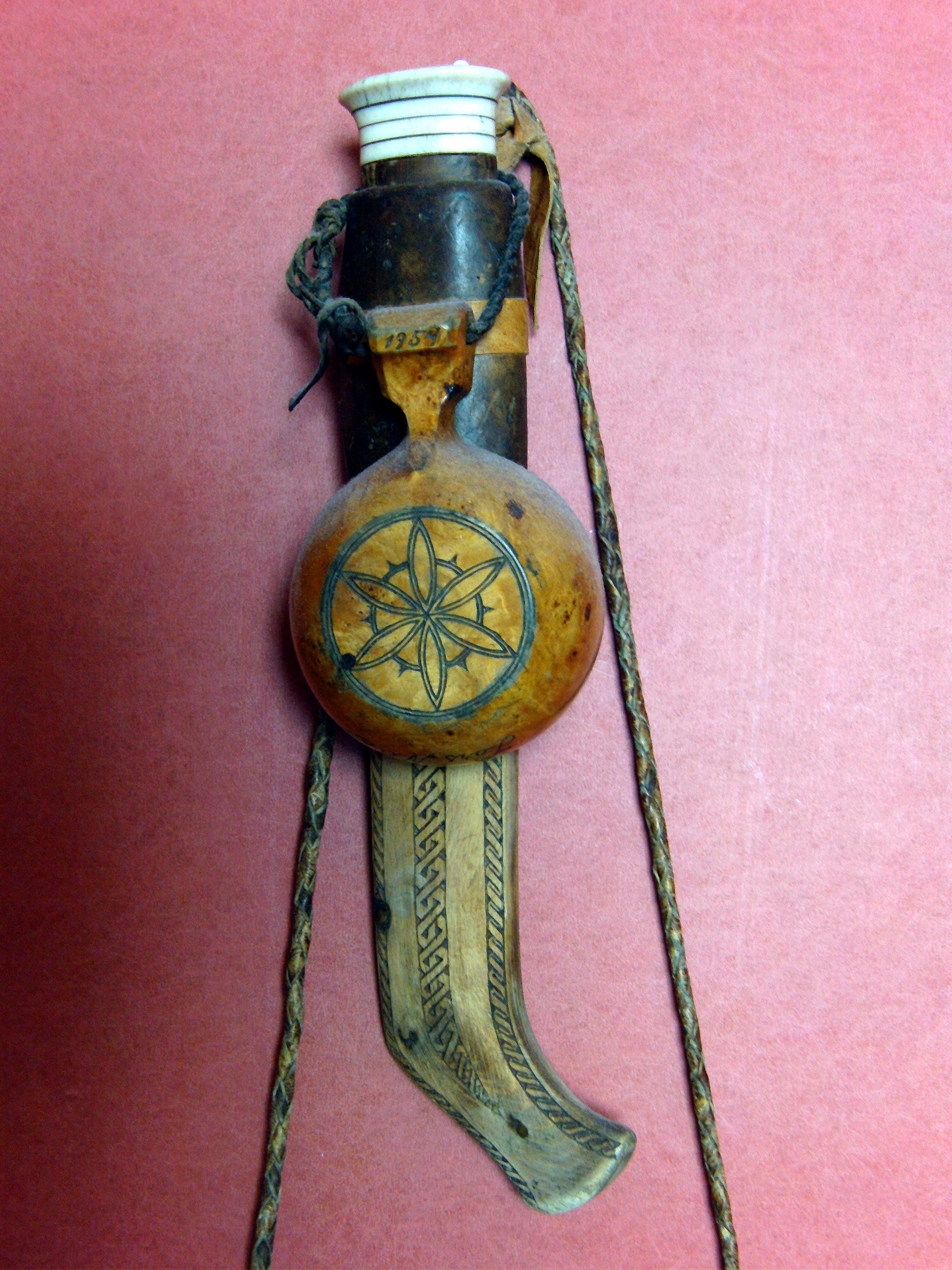
Drinking cup and knife

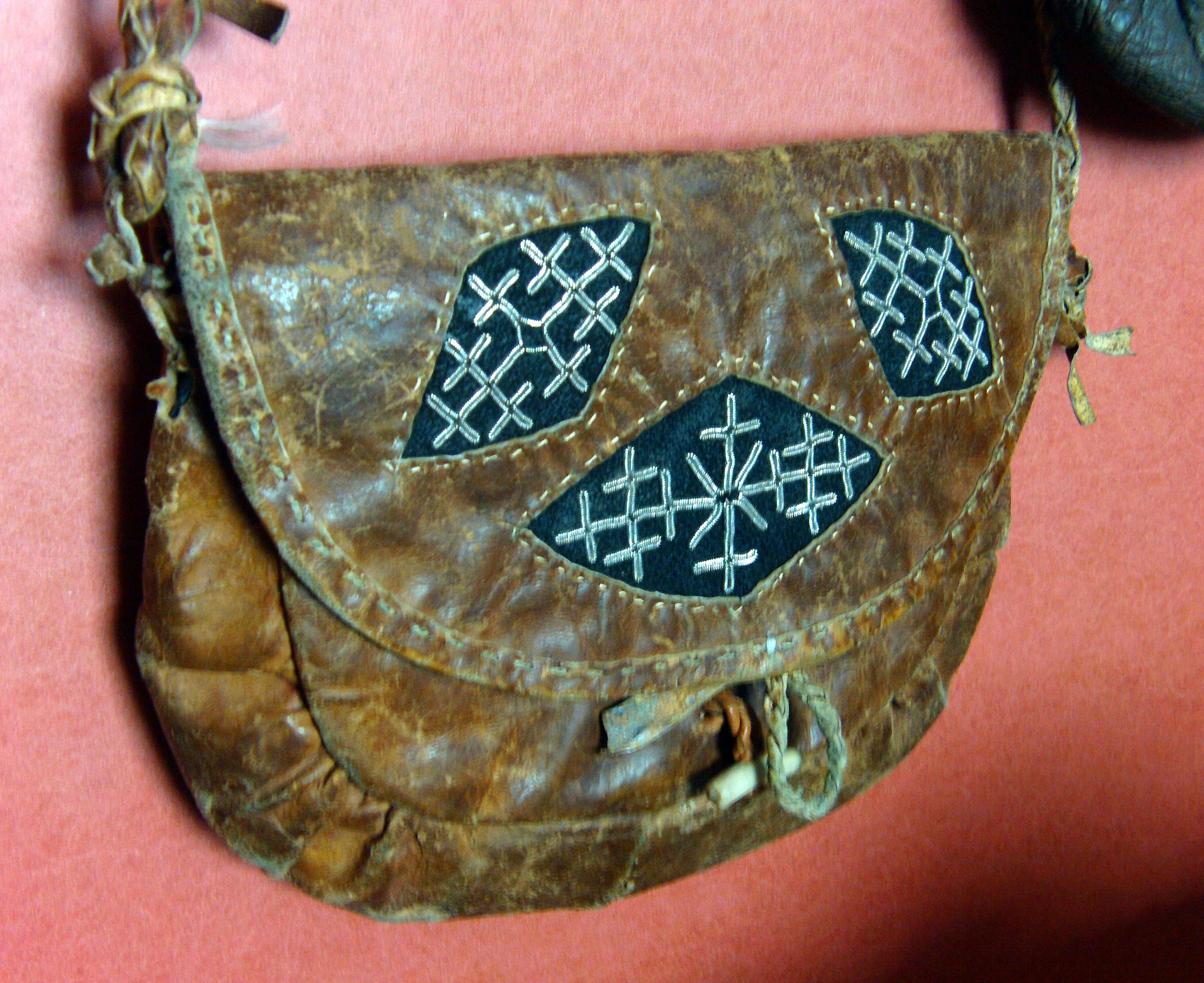
Sámi purse (handbag)

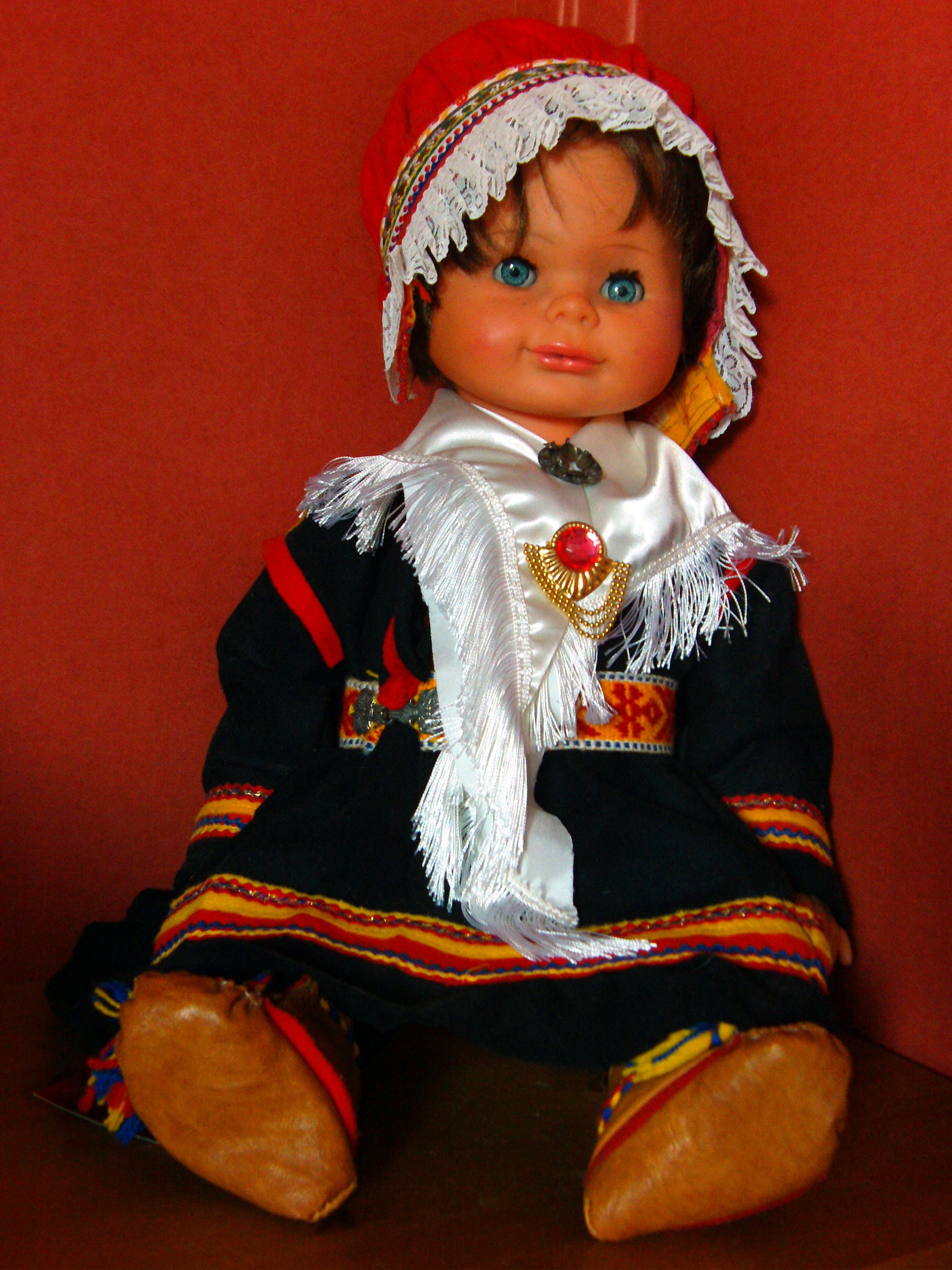
Doll in gákti

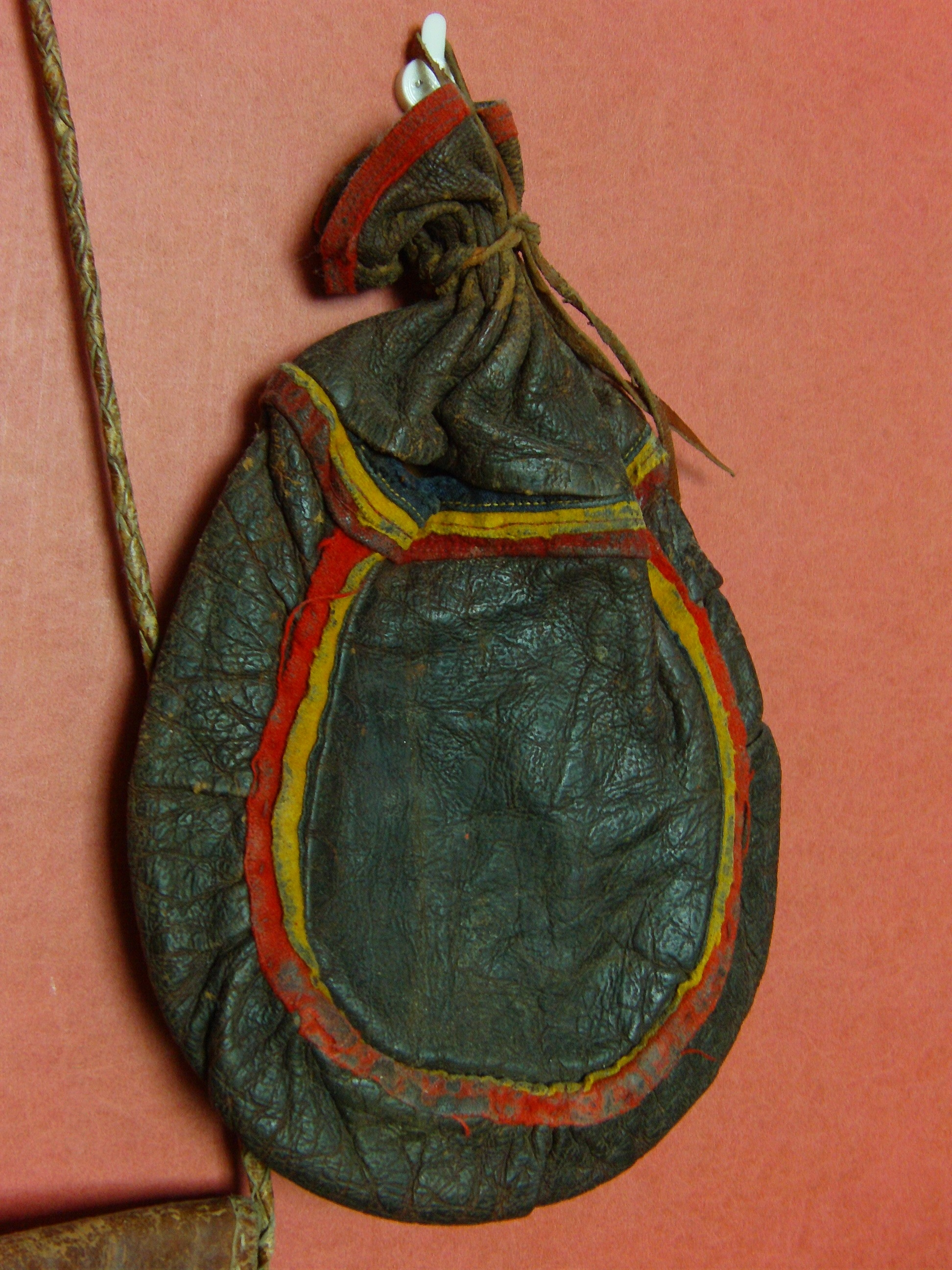
Coffee bag

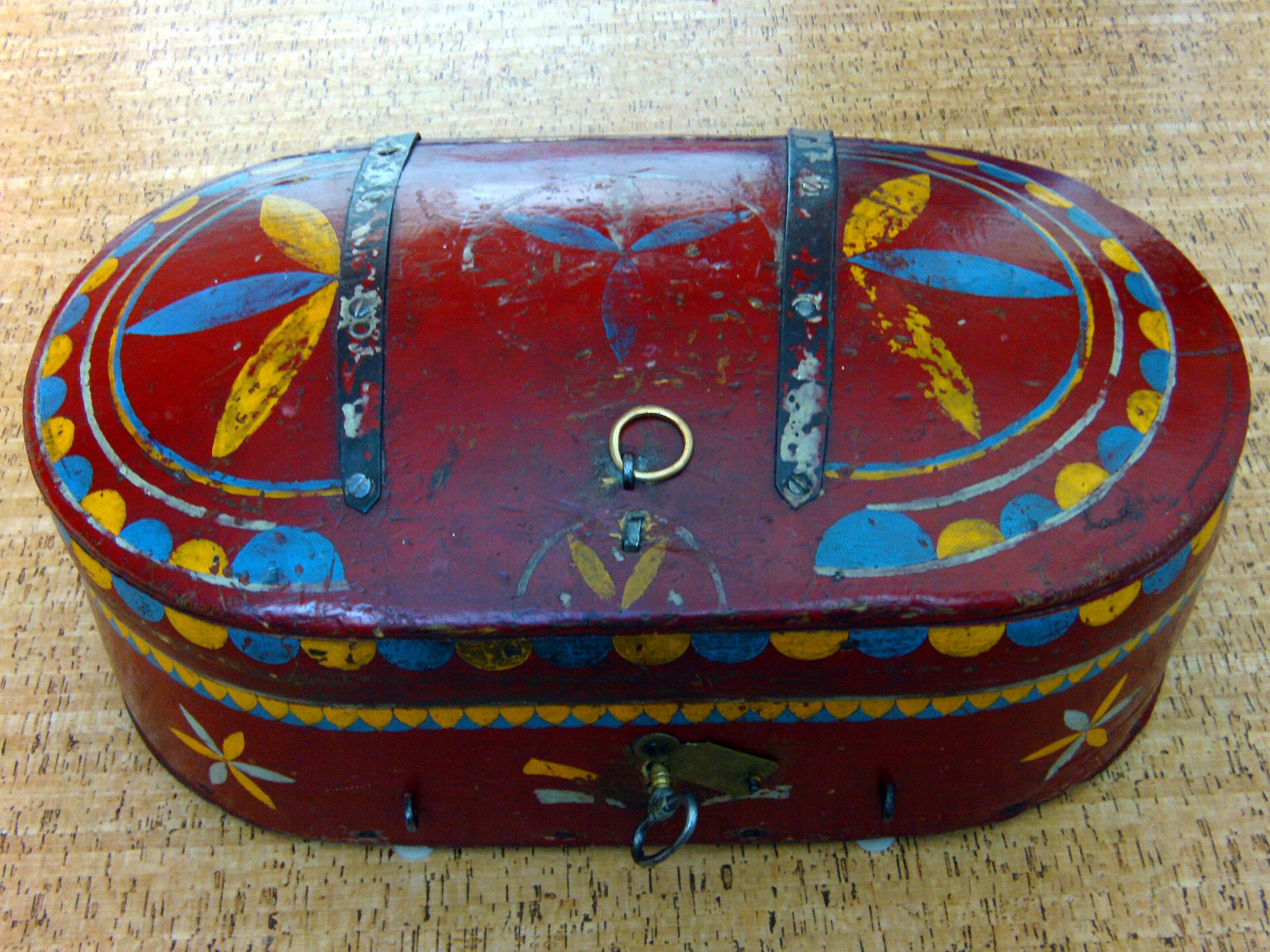
Chest

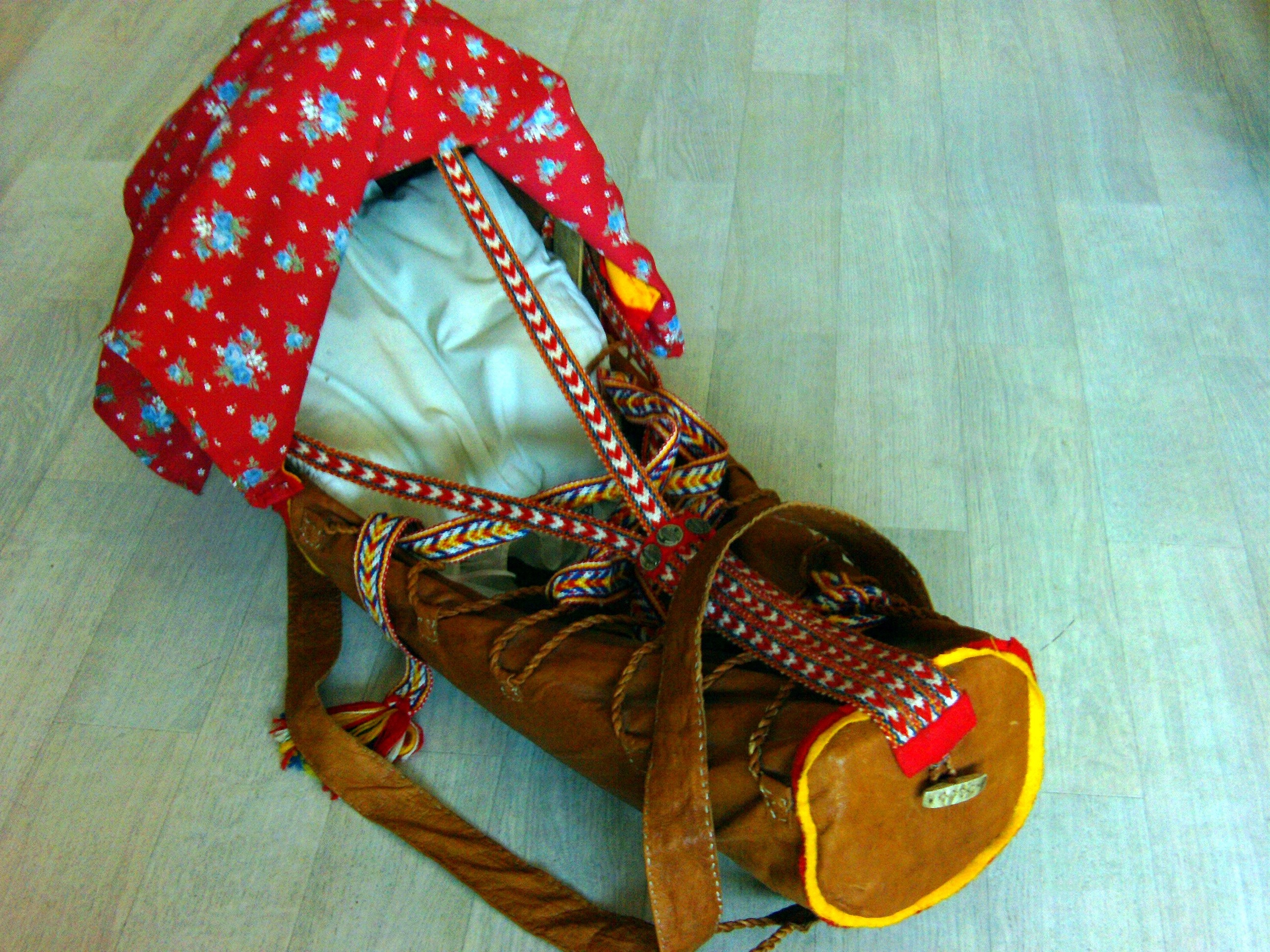
Infant bed

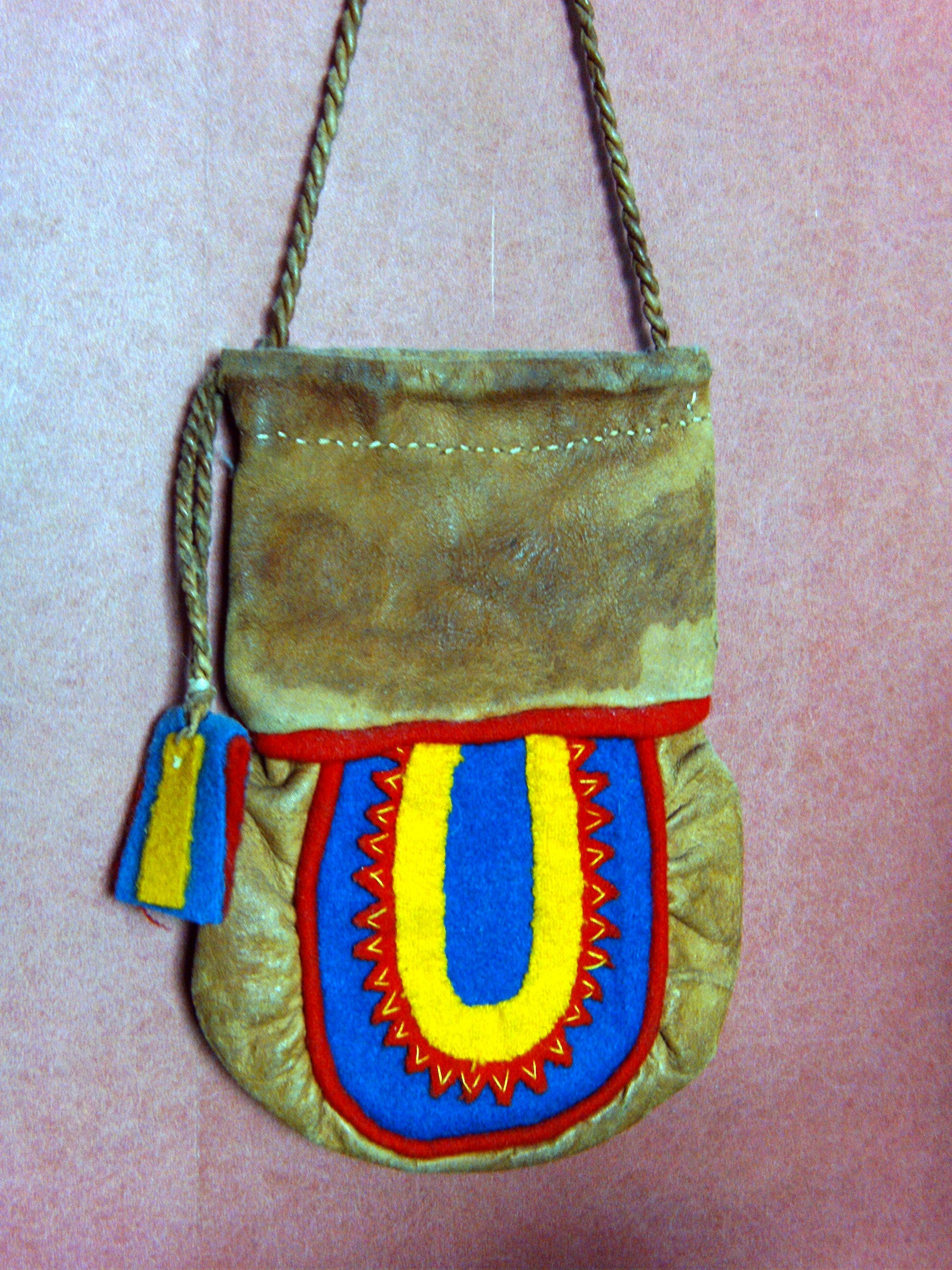
Coffee bag

== See also ==
- Kuksa
- Gákti
