= Per Isak Juuso =

Swedish-Sámi artist, artisan and teacher (born 1953)

Per Isak Nikolaus Juuso, born 1 May 1953 in Karesuando parish, Norrbotten County, Sweden, is a Swedish-Sámi artisan and teacher.

== Biography ==
Per Isak Juuso grew up in Mertajärvi, south of Karesuando. His parents were active reindeer herders and he learned to be an artisan from them. He trained to become a silversmith, then furthered his education in metal and design, the latter for the textile artist Wanja Djanaieff. He has also studied pedagogy at the Sámi University of Applied Sciences in Kautokeino.

Juuso has worked in metal, wood, horn, leather and textiles and has been a leading developer of modern Sámi handicrafts (daidda duodji). He has worked as a Sámi handicraft teacher at the Sámi Folk High School in Jokkmokk and then as a teacher in duodji (the traditional Sámi handicraft) part-time at the Sámi University in Kautokeino.

Juuso lives and works in Mertajärvi, where he has his studio. He received a Sámi Artists' Council work scholarship of 200,000 Norwegian kroner in January 2012. He has had exhibitions of his work in Sápmi, Canada, Japan, USA and Iceland, and his works have been bought by government and public bodies as well as by private collectors.
