= Noggin (cup) =

Wooden drinking vessell

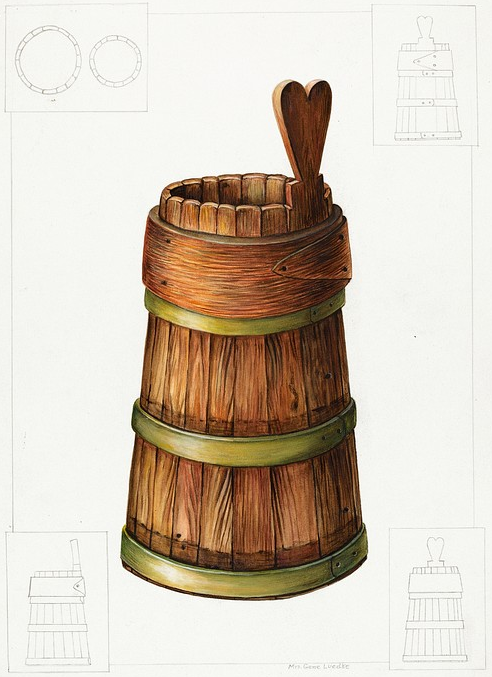
A noggin

A noggin is a small drinking cup, generally carved from the burr of a tree. The noggin was first mentioned in the mid 17th century, initially as the cup, and later coming to mean a quarter of a pint equal to a gill. Its use later spread to North America.

The origin of the name is not certain, but probably derives from nog, a strong type of ale brewed in Norfolk, England. The noggin then became a noigin (Irish) or noigean (Gaelic).

The Scandinavian guksi is a similar vessel, carved from the burl of a birch tree.
