= Eskelisen Lapinlinjat =

Bus transport company in Finland

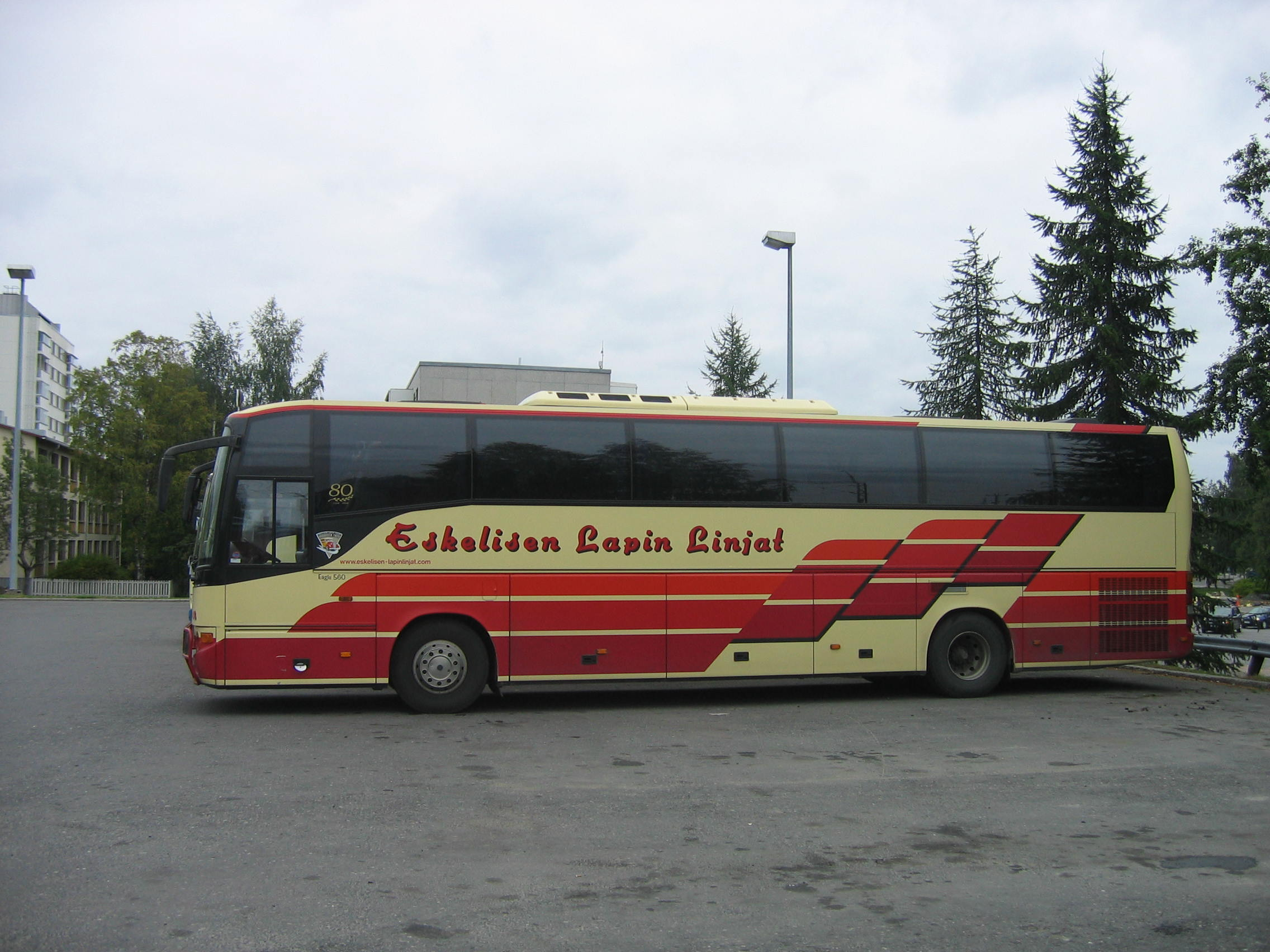
Eskelisen's Lahti 560 Eagle at Oulu bus station

J.M. Eskelisen Lapin Linjat Oy is a bus transport company operating in Finland. The company specialises in long-distance connections in Lapland.

Eskelisen Lapinlinjat is a significant bus transport company in tourism to Lapland. Most of the lines operated by the company start all the way south from either Helsinki or Turku, and continue northwards to Oulu and Rovaniemi. From there, the lines continue northwest to Kilpisjärvi and Tromsø or north towards Utsjoki and Nordkapp. The company is the only public bus company in Finland to serve routes to Norwegian Lapland. Because a complete trip from Helsinki or Turku to Tromsø takes about 23 hours, the company can only afford a single trip per day.

== Routes ==
All serviced routes share a common route section Oulu–Pudasjärvi–Ranua–Rovaniemi.

Routes from the south to Oulu:

- Main route: Helsinki–Lahti–Heinola–Jyväskylä–Hirvaskangas–Oulu
- Western route (used occasionally): Turku–Rauma–Pori–Vaasa–Raahe–Oulu

Routes northwards from Rovaniemi:

- Western route: Rovaniemi–Lohiniva–Kolari–Olos–Muonio–Palojoensuu–Karesuvanto–Kilpisjärvi–Skibotn–Nordkjosbotn–Tromsø
- Central route: Rovaniemi–Sodankylä–Vuotso–Saariselkä–Ivalo–Inari–Kaamanen
  - Western central route: Kaamanen–Karigasniemi–Karasjok–Lakselv–Nordkapp
  - Central central route: Kaamanen–Utsjoki–Skipagurra–Vadsø
  - Eastern central route: Kaamanen–Kirkenes
