= Outi Pieski =

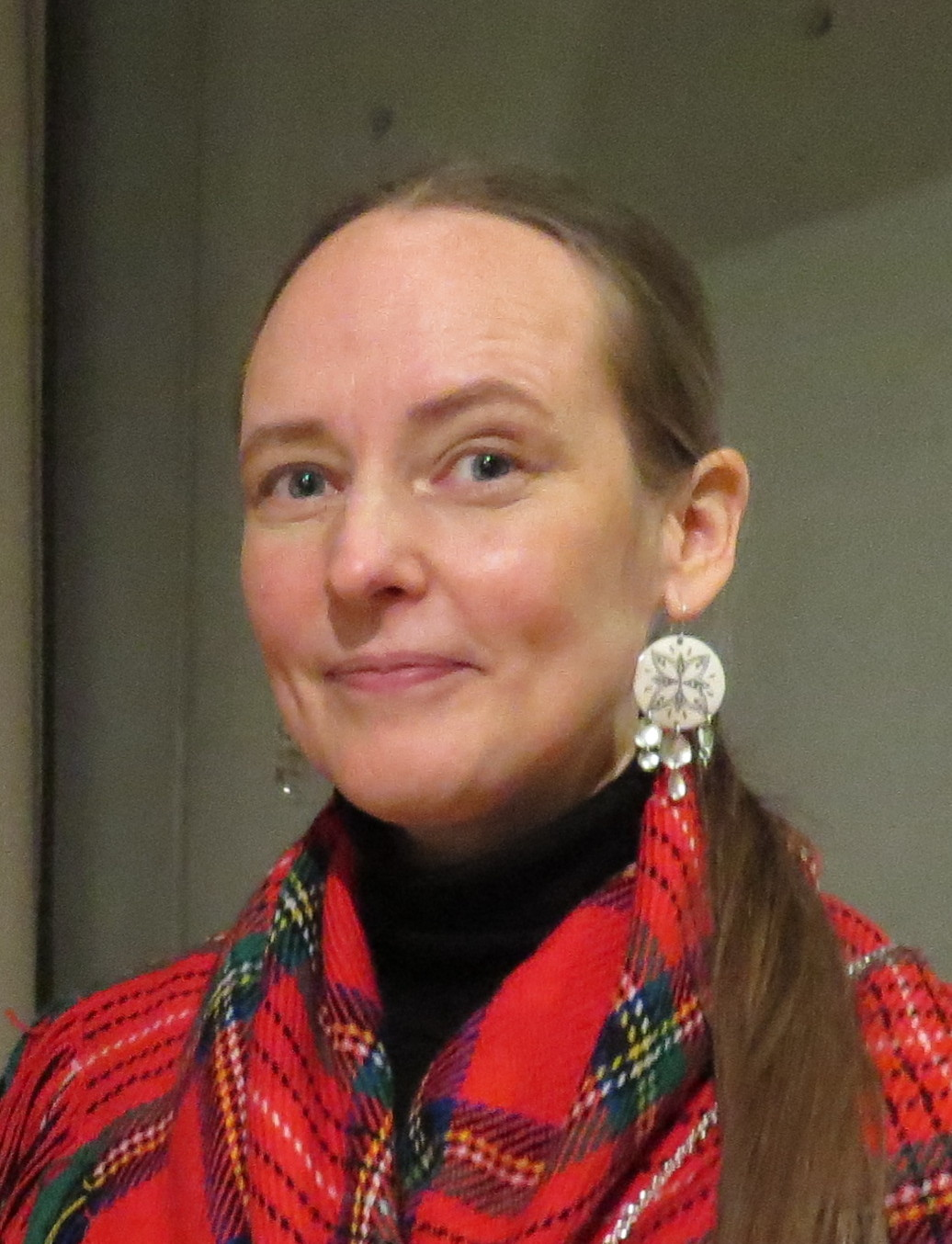
- Outi Pieski at the EMMA Art Museum in Espoo, 6 January 2019
- Born: 1973 (age 51–52); Helsinki, Finland
- Known for: Visual arts

Outi Pieski (born 1973) is a Sámi visual artist from Finland whose paintings, collages and installations employ traditional handicrafts such as the tassels of Sámi shawls to depict the light and landscapes of the far north. In 2017, she was honoured with the Fine Arts Academy of Finland Award.

== Biography ==
Born in Helsinki in 1973, Outi Pieski is the daughter of a Sámi father and a Finnish mother. She was raised in Helsinki where she attended the Visual Arts School and the Academy of Fine Arts where she graduated in 2000. She also studied at the Sámi Education Institute in Inari.

Her paintings are frequently framed with the tassels of traditional Sámi shawls. She has also employed yarn, branches and ornamental quilts to enhance her works. She has recently sought to emphasize light and nature in the Arctic areas of the North, enhancing the cultural environment.

Pieski has exhibited widely with solo exhibitions in London's Southbank Centre (2017), at the Espoo Museum of Modern Art (2018) and at the Oulu Museum of Art (2019). Internationally, her works have been included in group exhibitions at Scandinavia House in New York, the Phillips Collection Museum in Washington, D.C. and at the Felleshus, Berlin.
