= Lisma =

Village in Inari, Finland

Lisma Lismá
- Village
- Location in Finland Lisma (Finland)
- Coordinates: 68°22′15″N 25°28′40″E
- Country: Finland
- Region: Lapland
- Sub-region: Northern Lapland
- Municipality: Inari

Population (2019)
  - Total: 16
- Time zone: UTC+2 (EET)
  - Summer (DST): UTC+3 (EEST)

Lisma (Northern Sami: Lismá) is a small village in the municipality of Inari that is surrounded by the Lemmenjoki National Park. As of 2019, the village had a population of 16.

Reindeer herding is an important livelihood in Lisma. The village is part of the Sallivaara reindeer herding district (paliskunta) along with Ivalon Matti, Kuttura, Lemmenjoki, Menesjärvi and Repojoki.

== Etymology ==
The name of Lisma is derived from that of the river Lismajoki (Lismájohka), a tributary of the Ivalojoki. The initial element is likely derived from an unattested Northern Sámi cognate of Lule Sámi lissjme, meaning 'forested hillside (below a treeless top)'. The original form of the name was Lišmá; the modern Lismá is influenced by the Finnish form, itself borrowed from Northern Sámi.

== History ==
The Sallivaara area was used as winter pasture by Sámi reindeer herders from Kautokeino in Norway until 1852, when the border between Norway and Finland (then part of Russia) was closed. New settlers came to the area from Karasjok, among them Niila Länsman (Salkko-Niila), who settled along the Lismajoki in the 1870s. The settlement was initially known as Salkko, later as Lismajoki and finally Lisma. In 1893, there were two households in Lisma: Lismajoki and Hannula, of which the former was established by Länsman and the latter by Hans Kitti from Utsjoki. Lismajoki was later divided into two estates.

The closest school to Lisma was located in Menesjärvi, established in 1954 and closed in 2005. A road to Lisma was built in the 1970s and electricity was introduced in 1989.
