= Syväjärvi =

Syväjärvi (English: a deep lake) is a name for 108 lakes in Finland with no less surface than one hectare. The total area covered by all the Syväjärvis is 39,32 km^{2}, on the average 0,36 km^{2}.

== Location ==
=== Inari ===
- Syväjärvi (Inari) 5
