= Törmänen =

Village in Inari, Finland

Törmänen Tiärmáá (Inari Sami) Dearpmáš (Northern Sami)
- Village
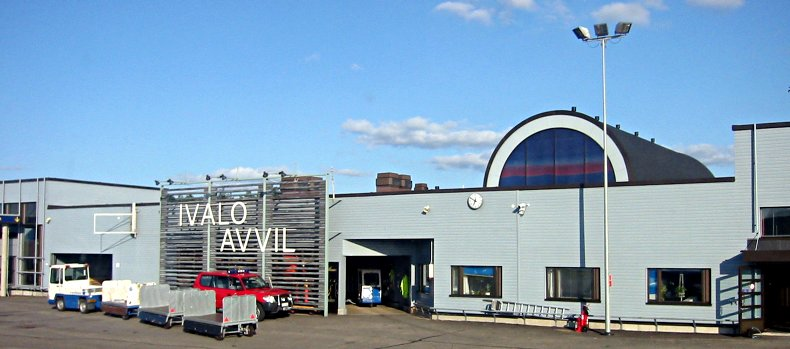
- Ivalo Airport

- Location in Finland Törmänen (Finland)
- Coordinates: 68.610°N 27.488°E
- Country: Finland
- Region: Lapland
- Sub-region: Northern Lapland
- Municipality: Inari

Population (2019)
  - Total: 608
- Time zone: UTC+2 (EET)
  - Summer (DST): UTC+3 (EEST)

Törmänen (Inari Sami: Tiärmáá, Northern Sami: Dearpmáš) (Note: Variants and alternative names include Tiärmâš, Miälláá or Miällâš (Inari Sámi), Dearbmáš (Northern Sámi)) is a village in the municipality of Inari along the Finnish national road 4, approximately 5 kilometers (3.1 mi) south of Ivalo. As of 2019, the village had a total population of 608, of whom 323 lived in the urban area and 285 in its surroundings.

Road 9691, which leads to Ivalo Airport, branches off the national road 4 at Törmänen.

== Etymology ==
The name of Törmänen refers to the many steep riverbanks (Finnish: törmä, Inari Sami: termi) in the area. The Inari Sámi form Tiärmáá is original, while the Finnish and Northern Sámi forms are calques of it.

== Geography ==
Törmänen is located along the river Ivalojoki. The village center consists of Törmänen proper, Huuhkaja and the areas around the airport and lake Alajärvi. Most houses in the village are concentrated around the river and the national road 4. The distance to Ivalo is approximately 5 kilometers (3.1 mi), while the distance to Saariselkä is 30 kilometers (19 mi).

The urban area covering parts of Törmänen, as defined by Statistics Finland, is officially known as Teponmäki. As of 31 December 2023, it had a population of 386, a surface area of 3.45 square kilometers (1.33 sq mi) and a population density of 111.9 inhabitants per square kilometer (290/sq mi). Teponmäki is the name of a residential area east of Törmänen.

== History ==
The history of Törmänen is closely tied to that of Ivalo, historically known as Kyrö. The Kyrö farm was established in 1758 by Heikki Kyrö, a Finnish settler from Isokyrö. In 1805, Kyrö's youngest son sold his portion of the estate to Tuomas Kyrö (unrelated) from Kittilä, who then settled in what would become Törmänen.

The Great Partition was not fully carried out in Inari until the early 20th century. In 1913, the partition was carried out in Törmänen, increasing the number of estates in the village from 8 to 21.

== Services ==
=== Transport ===
The Ivalo Airport is located in Törmänen. It was initially built by German soldiers during World War II in 1943 and destroyed during the Lapland War. The airport was rebuilt in 1950. Flights to Rovaniemi began in 1955 and flights to Helsinki in 1975.

=== School ===
The Törmänen school was established in 1934. A new main building was finished in 1951 and expanded in 1963. The school was closed in 2017 and its students were relocated to the Ivalo school.
