= Otsamo fell =

Fell in Inari, Finland

Coordinates: 68.88412°N 26.83333°E

Otsamo fell (Otsamotunturi in Finnish) is a fell in Inari, Finland. The highest point of the fell is 418 metres (1,371 ft) above sea level. The fell is about 8 kilometres (5.0 mi) from the village of Inari. There is a cabin on top of the fell that is free to use for hikers.

The fell is a popular hiking destination in Inari. A 10-kilometre (6.2 mi) trekking path leads from Siida, Inari to Otsamo fell.
