= Ivalo Airport =

Airport in Ivalo, Inari, Finland

Ivalo Airport Ivalon lentoasema

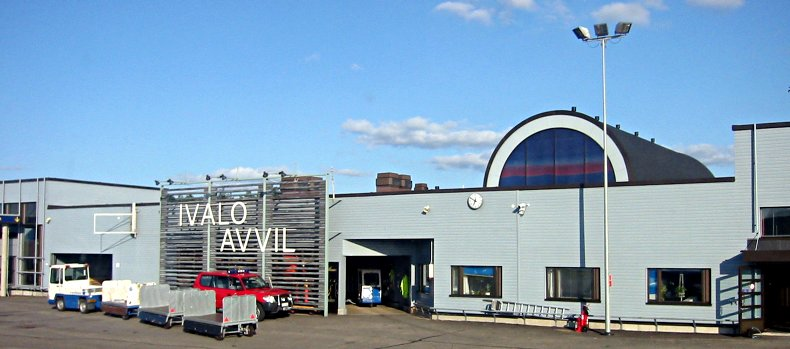
- IATA: IVL; ICAO: EFIV

Summary
- Airport type: Public
- Operator: Finavia
- Serves: Inari
- Location: Törmänen, Inari, Finland
- Time zone: EET (UTC+2)
  - Summer (DST): EEST (UTC+3)
- Elevation AMSL: 147 m (482 ft)
- Coordinates: 68°36′39″N 027°24′50″E
- Website: finavia.fi

Maps
- Location within Finland
- Interactive map of Ivalo Airport

Runways
Direction	Length		Surface
Direction	m	ft	Surface
04/22	2,499	8,199	Asphalt

Statistics (2020)
- Passengers: 249,056
- Change (2024–2025): ▲ +0.0%
- Landings (2020): 656
- Source: AIP Finland

Ivalo Airport (IATA: IVL, ICAO: EFIV) (Finnish: Ivalon lentoasema, Northern Sami: Avvila girdingieddi, Inari Sami: Avveel kirdemkieddi, Skolt Sami: Âʹvvel ǩeʹrddemǩedd, Swedish: Ivalo flygplats) is an airport in Inari, Finland. It is located in the village of Törmänen, 11 kilometres (7 mi) southwest from Ivalo, the municipal centre of Inari, and 25 kilometres (16 mi) north of Saariselkä. It is the northernmost airport in Finland and in the European Union. The airport has one 2,499-meter-long runway, which is equipped with an instrument landing system.

== Airlines and destinations ==
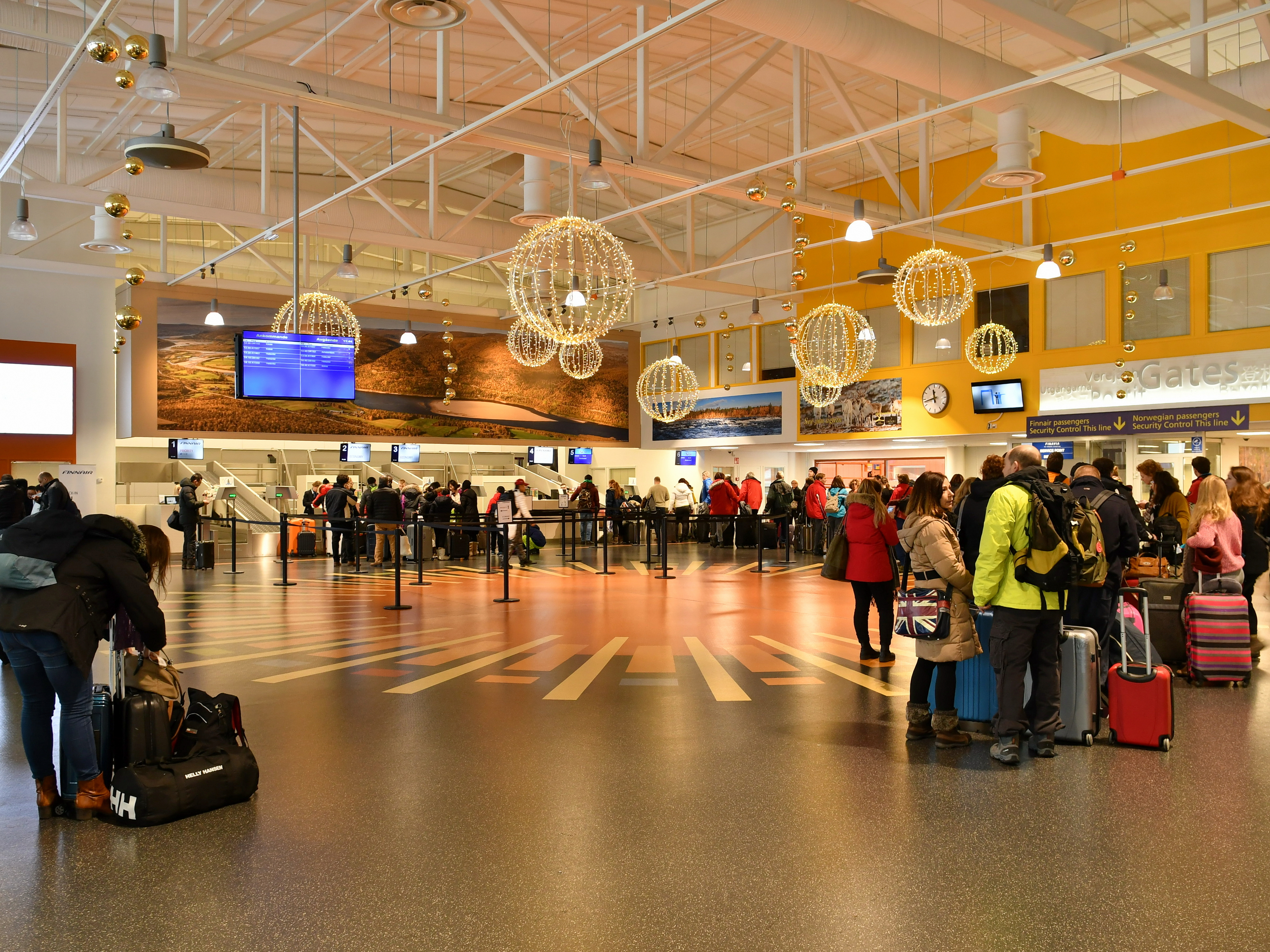
Check-in hall at Ivalo Airport.

The following airlines operate regular scheduled and charter flights at Ivalo Airport:

Airlines	Destinations
Austrian Airlines	Seasonal: Vienna
British Airways	Seasonal: London–Gatwick
Discover Airlines	Seasonal: Munich (begins 23 December 2026)
Edelweiss Air	Seasonal: Zurich
Eurowings	Seasonal: Düsseldorf
Finnair	Helsinki, Kirkenes
Lufthansa	Seasonal: Frankfurt
Transavia	Seasonal: Paris–Orly
TUI fly Netherlands	Seasonal: Amsterdam
Vueling	Seasonal: Paris–Orly

== Statistics ==
Annual passenger statistics for Ivalo Airport
Year	Domestic passengers	International passengers	Total passengers	Change
1998	114,113	2,924	117,037	
1999	111,378	3,545	114,923	−1.8% ▼
2000	124,587	8,003	132,590	+15.4% ▲
2001	127,863	3,826	131,689	−0.7% ▼
2002	124,740	11,068	135,808	+3.1% ▲
2003	117,251	18,450	135,701	−0.1% ▼
2004	128,442	25,625	154,067	+13.5% ▲
2005	123,257	28,954	152,211	−1.2% ▼
2006	121,908	31,427	153,335	+0.7% ▲
2007	117,305	28,565	145,870	−4.9% ▼
2008	113,374	24,279	137,653	−5.6% ▼
2009	110,004	20,588	130,592	−5.1% ▼
2010	92,838	19,102	111,940	−14.3% ▼
2011	103,815	21,720	125,535	+11.2% ▲
2012	121,957	23,498	145,455	+15.9% ▲
2013	117,249	29,065	146,314	+0.6% ▲
2014	118,112	24,607	142,719	−2.5% ▼
2015	123,272	31,936	155,208	+8.8% ▲
2016	139,037	40,590	179,627	+15.7% ▲
2017	160,906	49,660	210,566	+17.2% ▲
2018	182,934	59,523	242,457	+15.1% ▲
2019	183,122	56,631	239,753	−1.1% ▼
2020	95,936	18,986	114,922	−52.1% ▼
2021	77,628	32,892	110,520	−3.8% ▼
2022	137,978	60,009	197,987	+79.1% ▲
2023	155,697	65,021	220,718	+11.5% ▲
2024	177,925	71,025	248,950	+12.8% ▲
2025	169,670	79,386	249,056	+0.0% ▲

== See also ==
- List of the largest airports in the Nordic countries
