= Kuttura =

Kuttura (Finnish) Guhtur (Northern Sami) Kuttoor (Inari Sami)
- Village
- Location in Finland
- Coordinates: 68°24′20″N 26°27′30″E
- Country: Finland
- Region: Lapland
- Municipality: Inari

Population
  - Total: 21

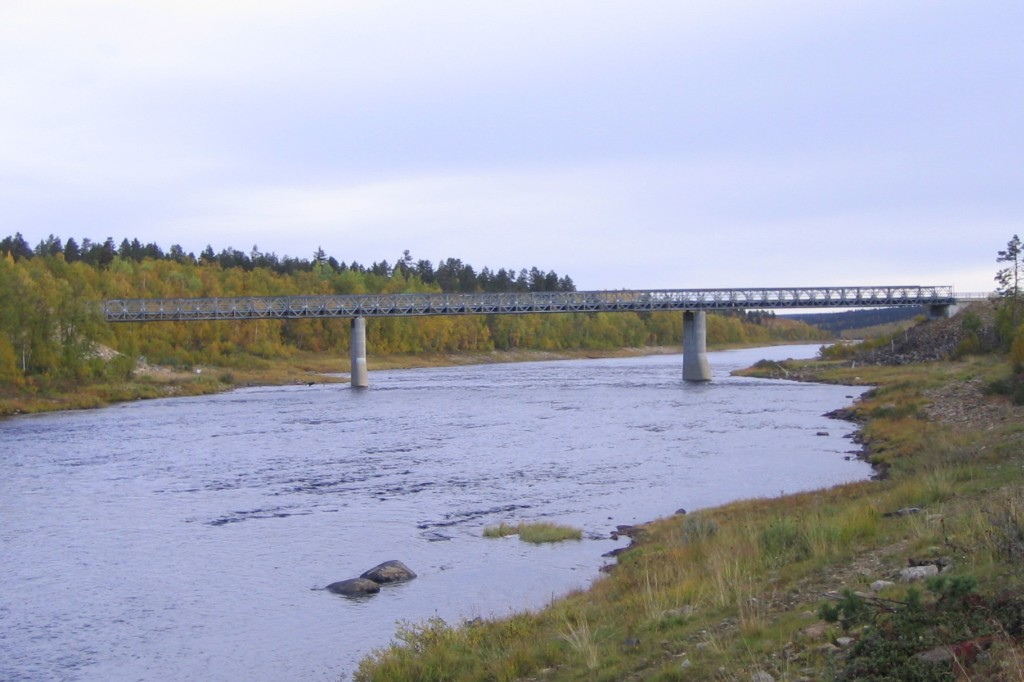
The bridge spanning the Ivalo River at Kuttura

Kuttura is a small village in Finland, in the southwest corner of the municipality of Inari on the west bank of the Ivalo River next to the Hammastunturi Wilderness Area. At the end of 2005, 21 people lived in the village.

== History ==
Kuttura is named after Guttorm Magga, a Sámi man from Enontekiö (Eanodat) who settled in the area with his son Nils in 1898. Other settlers came from Enontekiö as well.

President Urho Kekkonen visited the village while skiing from Enontekiö to Saariselkä in 1956, at which time the villages raised the issue of having a road to the village. Kekkonen promised to take care of the matter, which he did, and the villagers received their road in 1959. It is said that the road follows the straight line that Kekkonen drew on a map. Kekkonen's visit also gave rise to a placename: Kekkosenoja (Kekkonen's ditch). Until 1994, when a bridge was built, the only way to cross the Ivalo River was by boat.
