= Syväjärvi (Inari) =

Syväjärvi (English: a deep lake) is a name for 5 lakes in Inari which by surface are at least 1 hectare large.

== List of the Syväjärvis in Inari ==
- Syväjärvi, classification code 71.622.1.012 (0,213 km²)
- Syväjärvi, classification code 71.111.1.326 (0,206 km²)
- Syväjärvi, classification code 71.913.1.008 (0,141 km²)
- Syväjärvi, classification code 69.069.1.005 (0,109 km²)
- Syväjärvi, classification code 71.119.1.014 (0,042 km²)
