= Kati-Claudia Fofonoff =

Skolt Sámi author and translator

- Born: 8 December 1947; Ivalo, Finland
- Died: 12 June 2011 (aged 63)
- Resting place: Rovaniemi Orthodox Cemetery
- Occupations: writer, translator
- Writing career
- Language: Skolt Saami, Finnish

Kati-Claudia Fofonoff (8 December 1947 in Ivalo – 12 June 2011) was a Skolt Sámi author and translator who wrote in Skolt Sámi and Finnish. Her books have also been translated into Northern Sámi, Norwegian and Icelandic.

== Works ==
- Parnasso 2 1982 (Poems in Finnish)
- Koparat: joulukoparat 1987 (Poems in Finnish)
- Paatsjoen laulut – Pââšjooǥǥ laulli 1988-1989 (book and cassette)
- Jânnam muttum nuu’bbioo’ri 1998 (Poems in Skolt Saami)
- Vuämm Jeeʹelvuei’vv. Mainnâz. 2004
- Vanha jäkäläpää 1–2 2005 (CD)
- Suonikylän poluilta 1–3 2005 (CD)

== Translations ==
- Antoine de Saint-Exupéry: U’cc priinsâž 2000 (The Little Prince in Skolt Saami)
