= Tolonen =

Tolonen is a Finnish surname. Notable people with the surname include:

- Jussi Tolonen (1882–1962), Finnish smallholder and politician
- Armas Tolonen (1893–1954), Finnish politician
- Jukka Tolonen (born 1952), Finnish jazz guitarist
- Maximo Tolonen (born 2001), Finnish professional footballer
