= Siida (museum) =

Coordinates: 68°54′39″N 027°00′49″E

Sámi Museum Siida
- Siida - Suoma sámiid álbmotmusea
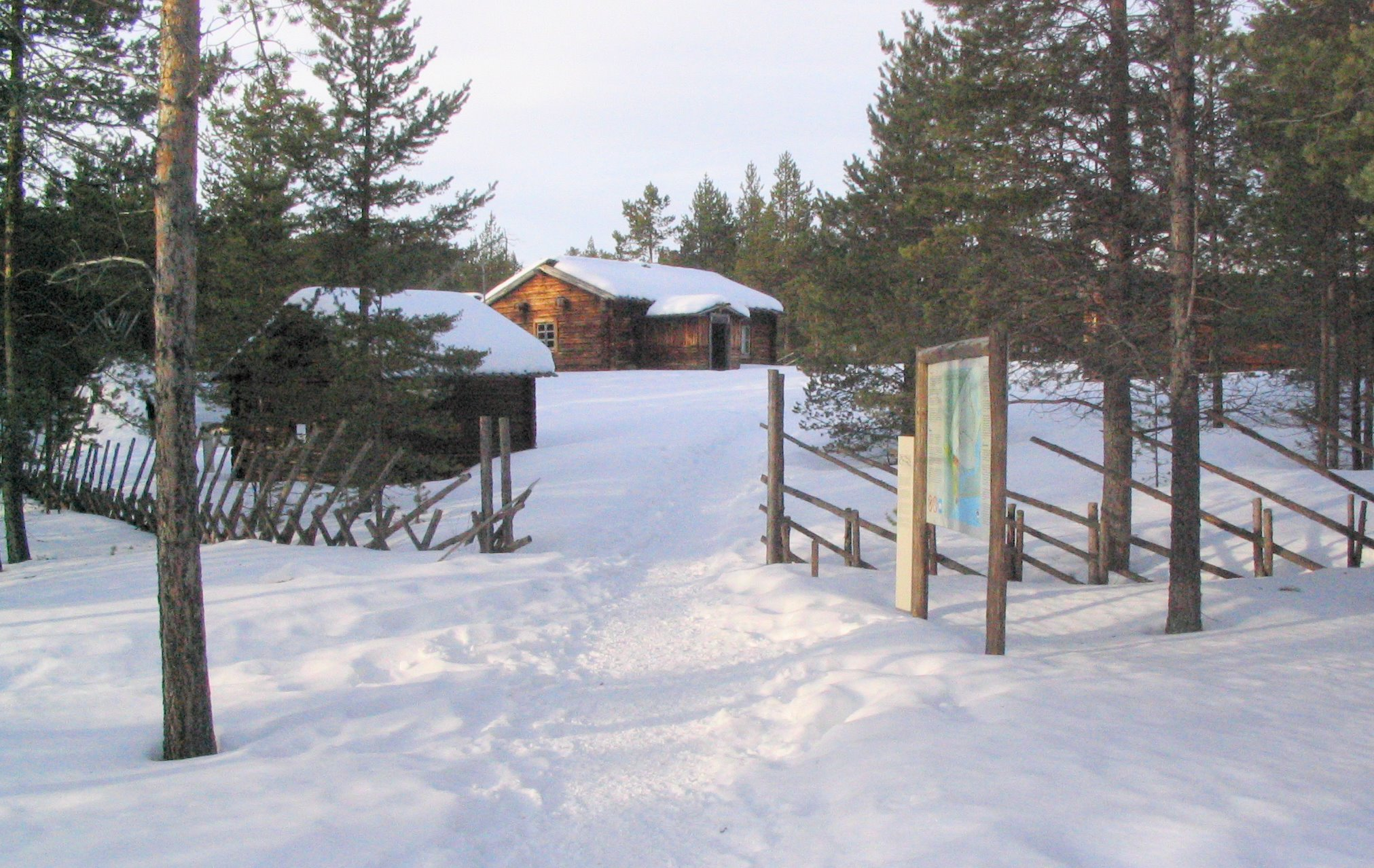
- The open-air museum of Siida.

- Location within Finland
- Former name: Inari Sámi Museum
- Established: April 1, 1998
- Location: Inari, Lapland, Finland
- Type: Ethnic museum / history museum / nature museum
- Website: siida.fi

Siida (lit. 'the place') is a museum located on Lake Inari in the village of Inari in Inari, Finland. It is home to the Sámi Museum and Northern Lapland Nature Centre. The museum was first opened on the 1st of April 1998.

== Exhibitions ==
Siida arranges exhibitions on Sámi culture and the nature of Northern Lapland. In addition, Siida has an open-air museum open in the summers, which was originally known as the Inari Sámi Museum. The first buildings were moved to the museum grounds in 1960. The 7-hectare (17-acre) area has nearly 50 sites of interest related to Lapland's nature and the Sámi and their culture. Furthermore, the area is where the earliest settlers in Northern Lapland lived and archaeological finds from approximately 9,000 years ago have been found.

In 2024 Siida received the European Museum of the Year Award.

== Images ==
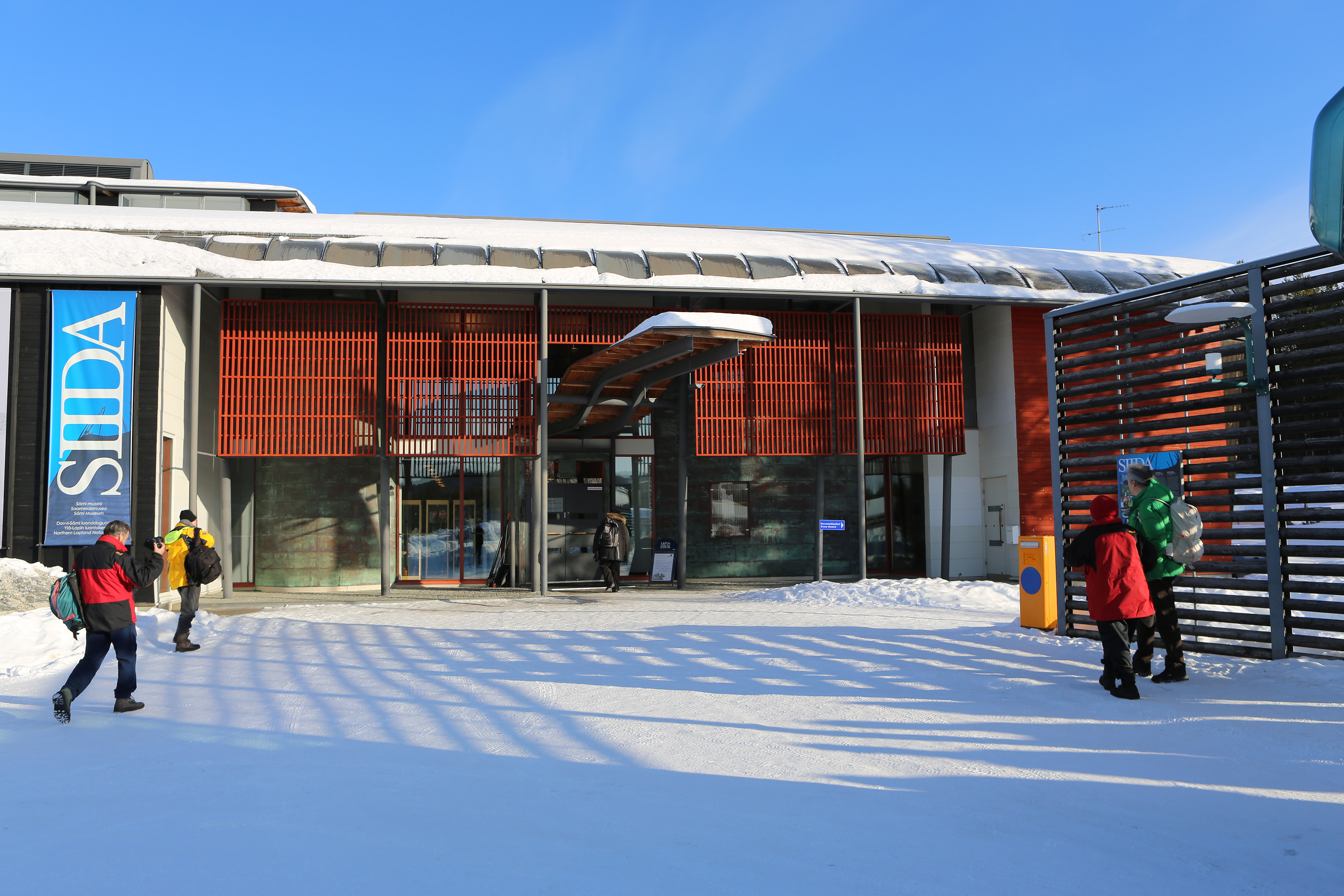
The main building of Siida.

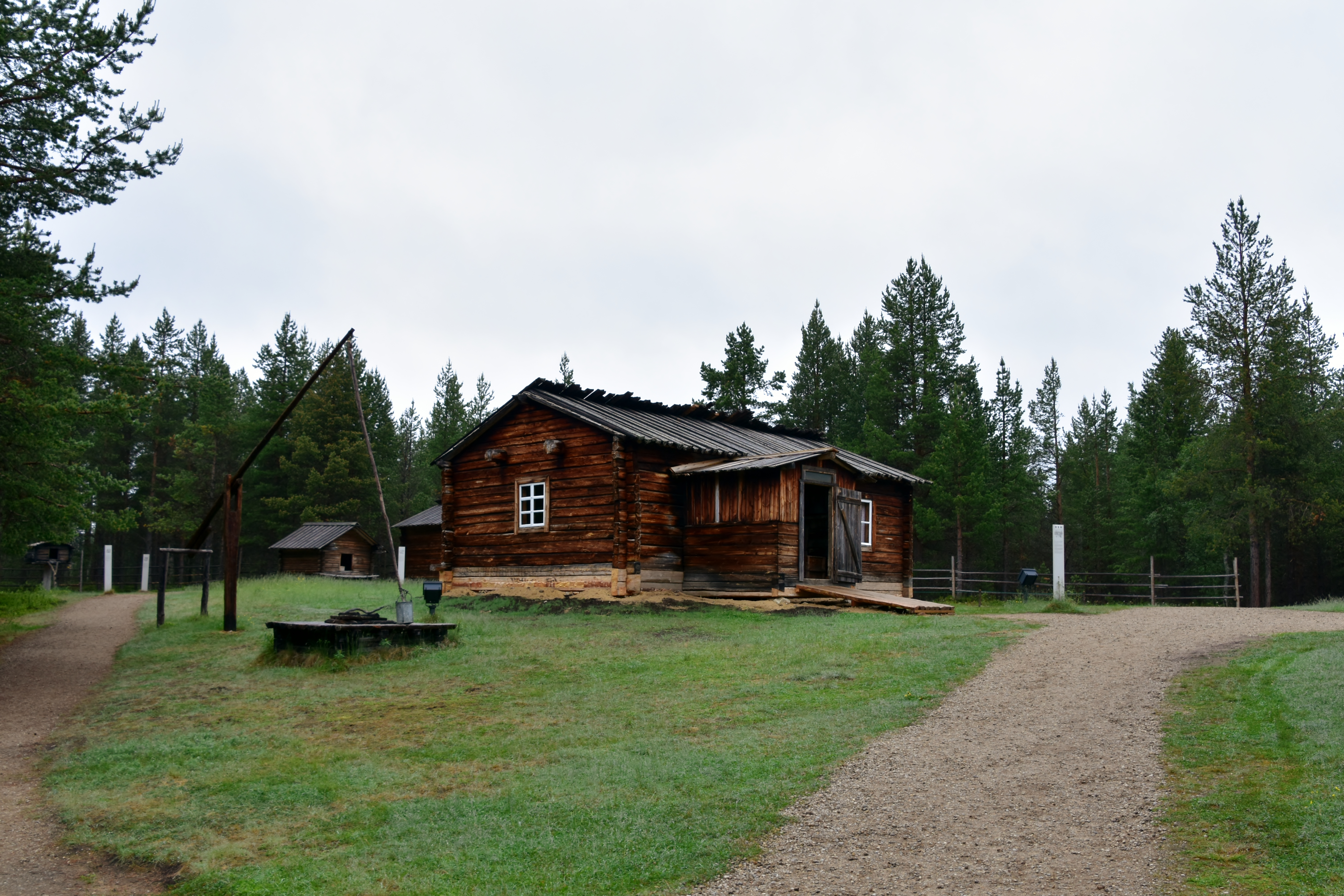
The open-air museum.

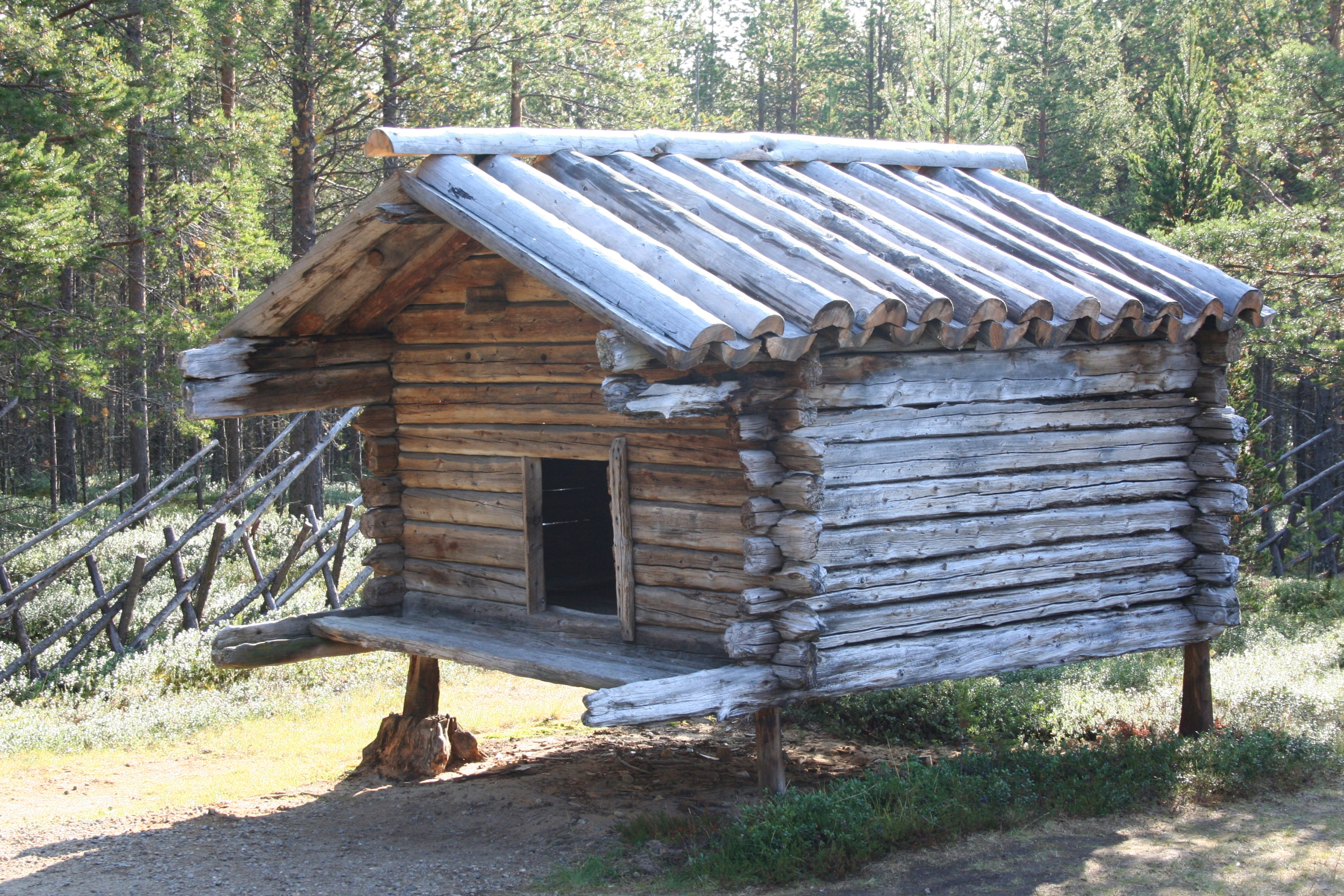
Ájtte, a traditional storage hut made of timber.

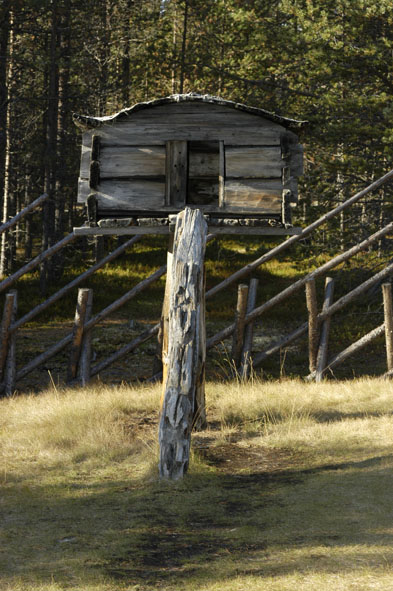
Njalla, a traditional building for storing food.

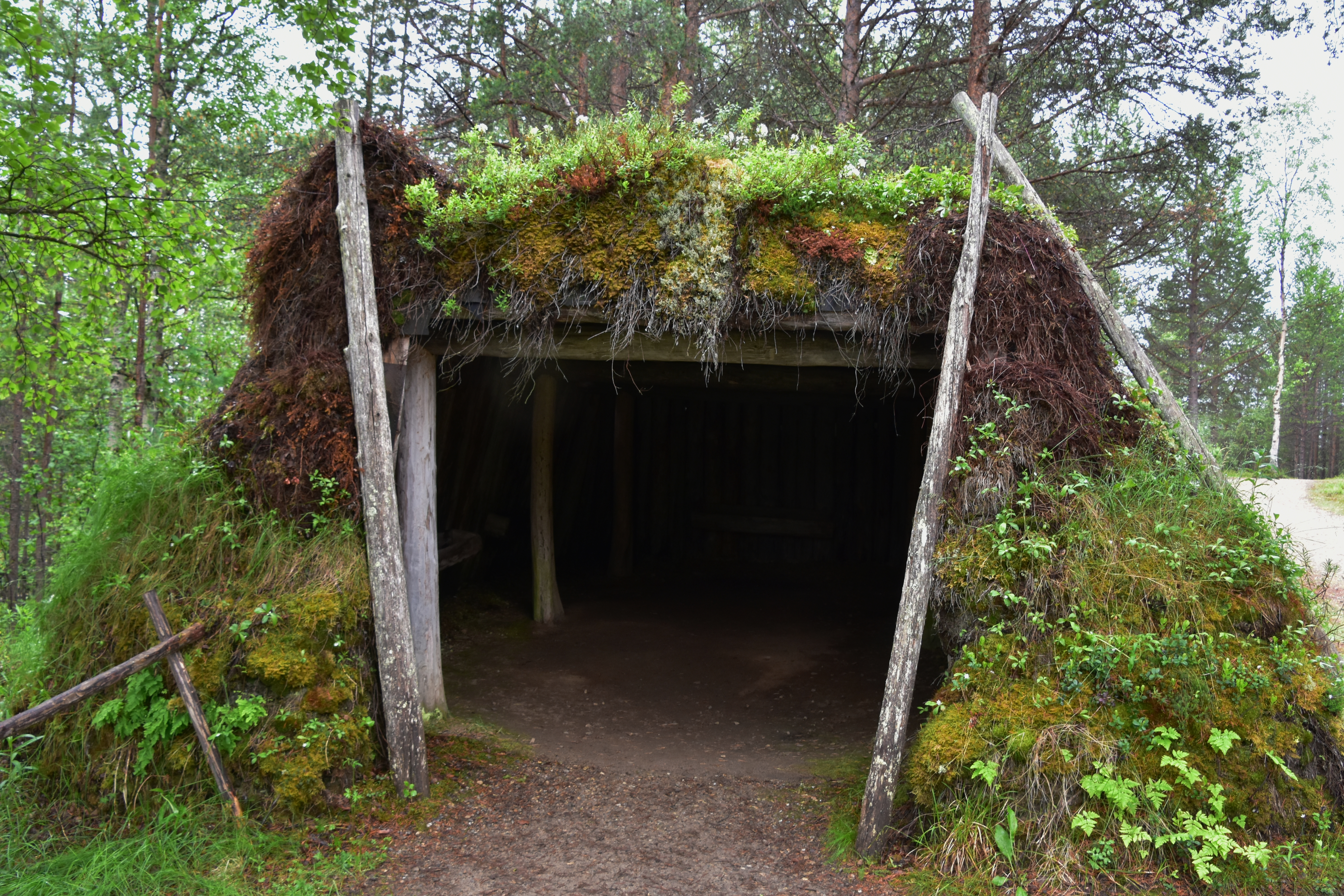
A reindeer shelter.

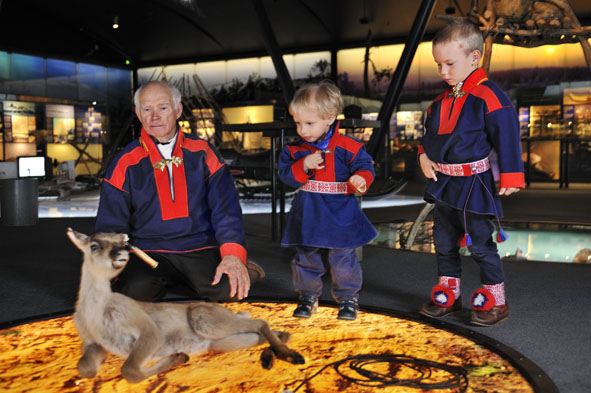
Interior inside the museum main building.

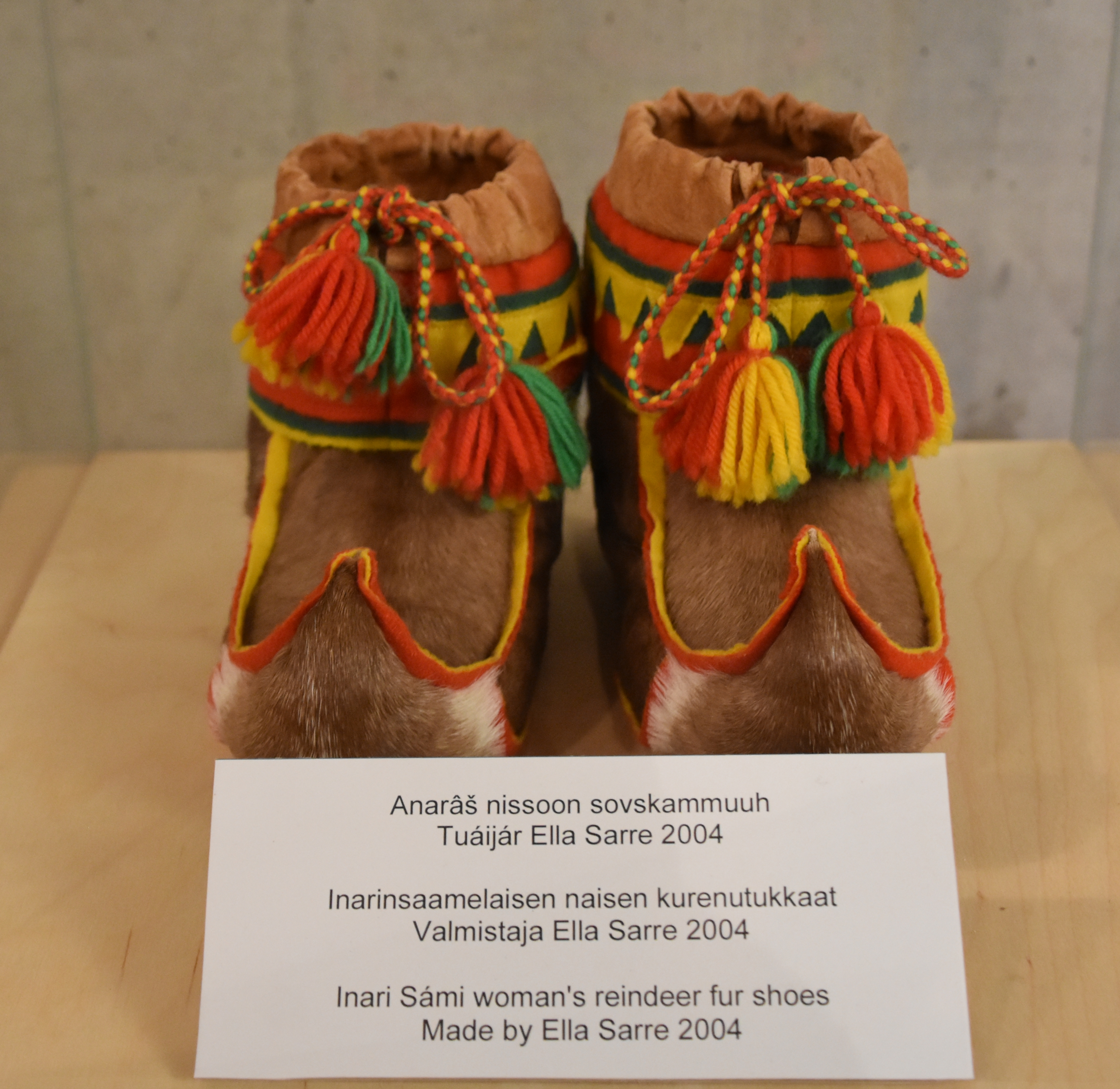
Sámi reindeer fur shoes in Siida.
