= Kaamanen =

Kaamanen: Kaamanen (Finnish); Gámas (Northern Sami); Kaamâs (Inari Sami)
- Location in Finland
- Coordinates: 69°06′14″N 27°11′46″E
- Country: Finland
- Region: Lapland
- Municipality: Inari

Population
  - Total: 200

Kaamanen (Northern Sami: Gámas, Inari Sami: Kaamâs) is a village in the municipality of Inari, Lapland.

The village counts about 200 inhabitants, whose main sources of livelihood are reindeer husbandry and tourism. The area is extremely valuable for bird-watchers and there are relatively important hiking paths.

== Languages ==
The municipality has four official languages: Finnish, Inari Sami (ca. 400 estimated speakers), Skolt Sami (ca. 400 speakers), and Northern Sami (ca. 700 speakers). The estimates of how many people have some command of each of the Sami languages differ from the number of people who list them as their mother tongues. Of the total population of 6,863 in 2010, 6,366 people registered Finnish as their mother tongue and 400 one of the Sami languages. 97 inhabitants were native speakers of other languages.
