= Ivalojoki =

River in the country of Finland

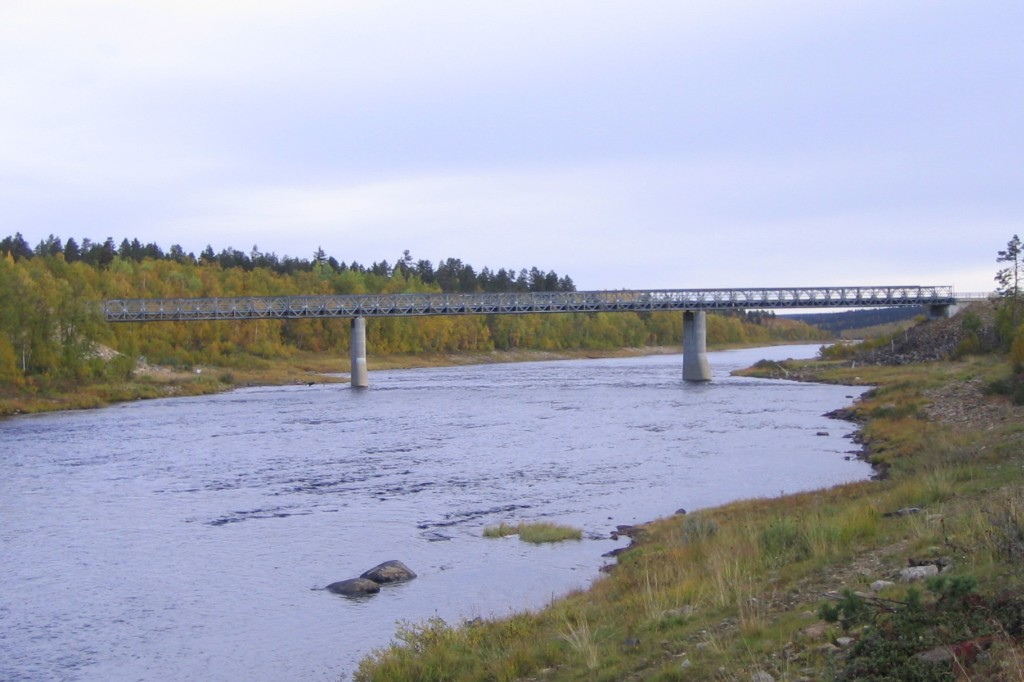
- Road bridge spanning Ivalojoki at Kuttura
- Native name: Ivalojoki (Finnish); Avviljohka (Northern Sami); Avveeljuuhâ (Inari Sami)

Location
- Country: Finland
- Region: Lapland

Physical characteristics
- Source
  - location: Korsatunturi
  - elevation: appr. 300 m (980 ft)
- Mouth: Lake Inari
  - coordinates: 68°45′20.9″N 027°38′33.0″E
  - elevation: 118.7 m (389 ft)
- Length: 180 km (110 mi)
- Discharge
  - average: 1 ‰

Ivalojoki (Northern Sami: Avviljohka, Inari Sami: Avveeljuuhâ) is a 180-kilometre-long (110 mi) river in Finland that flows through upper Lapland into Lake Inari.

Ivalojoki starts from the Korsatunturi hugging the border between the communities of Inari and Enontekiö, where two side streams are meeting. The first streams branching off of it can be found on the bogs of Peltotunturi on the border between Finland and Norway along the western border of the Lemmenjoki National Park. The river flows into Lake Inari from a 5-kilometre-long (3 mi) delta approximately 10 kilometres (6.2 mi) from the village of the same name, which is located on both banks of this meandering, shallow run. The Repo, Tolos, Sota and Kylä Rivers, the latter two of which are renowned for the gold found in them, are some of Ivalojoki's tributaries.

For almost its entire length, Ivalojoki flows through wilderness. Near its headwaters, the river meanders as a narrow stream through the southernmost bogs of the Lemmenjoki National Park. Halfway down its length, the national park becomes the Hammastunturi Wilderness Area, through which it flows almost all the way to Ivalo.

== River of gold ==
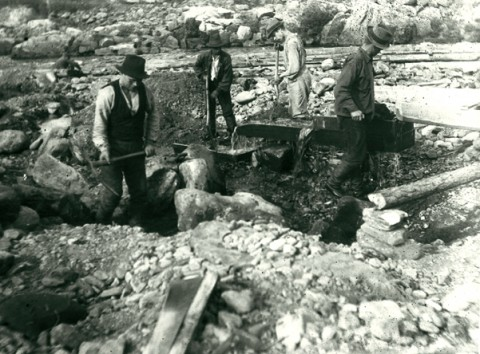
Gold mining in 1924

Ivalojoki has been nicknamed the "River of gold". During the Lapland gold rush in the 1870s, the place Kultala was built on the banks of the river some 17 kilometre (11 mi) down of Kuttura as a base for the state agency, distributing prospecting permits and warrants, cashing gold catches, monitoring gold property orders, and preparing claim maps. The movie Lapin kullan kimallus by director Åke Lindman portrays the height of the gold rush. In the late 1880s, the rush faded out. Even nowadays, hundreds of gold claims, differing greatly in size, are still staked out along the banks of the river and its tributaries.

== Tourism ==
Ivalojoki gains in popularity as a tourist attraction, it was named the Destination of the Year at the Retki 2005 fair. A 60-kilometre-long (37 mi) stretch of rapids from Kuttura to Tolonen has been a traditional destination for canoers. Lately, it has become popular with whitewater rafters, as well. Tourists can hike to areas where gold was and is still being mined by following marked trails. A pedestrian suspension bridge spans Ivalojoki at Kultala, which is an outdoor museum about the gold rush nowadays, offering accommodation for hikers.

Fishermen can try to catch trout and graylings. With luck, they might even snag a pike or whitefish. The river's tributaries are teeming with trout that range from 20 to 25 centimetres (8 to 10 in) long.
