= Hammastunturi Wilderness Area =

Protected area in Lapland region, Finland

- IUCN category VI (protected area with sustainable use of natural resources)
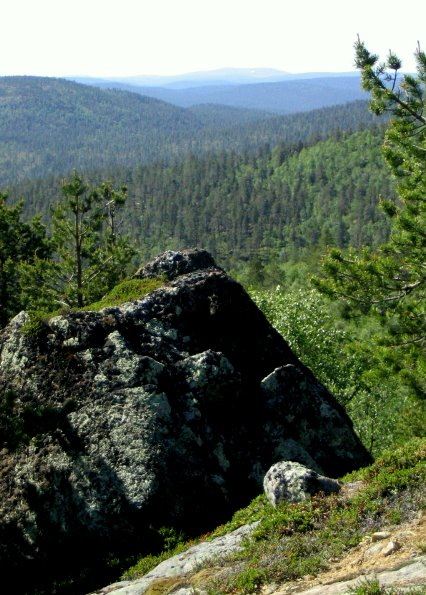

- Location within Finland
- Location: Lapland, Finland
- Coordinates: 68°31′N 26°37′E
- Area: 1,825 km^{2} (705 sq mi)
- Established: 1991
- Governing body: Metsähallitus

The Hammastunturi Wilderness Area (Finnish: Hammastunturin erämaa; literally translated "tooth fell") is located in Lapland, Finland. It was established in 1991 like all the other 11 wilderness areas of Finland. It covers 1,825 square kilometres (705 mi^{2}) situated in a fell and forest area between the Urho Kekkonen National Park and Lemmenjoki National Park. It is governed by the Metsähallitus.

The history of the area comprises reindeer husbandry, Lapland gold rush, and later road building and settlements. During the gold rush, around 1870, Kultala along the Ivalo River was a large village center inhabiting hundreds of people. There were as many gold diggers as the other people of Inari put together.
