= Armas Tolonen =

Finnish politician

Armas Tolonen (30 July 1893, Kivennapa – 26 November 1954) was a Finnish politician. He was a Member of the Parliament of Finland from 1949 to 1951, representing the Social Democratic Party of Finland (SDP).
