= Ivalo =

Ivalo Avveel (Inari Sami) Avvil (Northern Sami) Â’vvel (Skolt Sami)
- Village
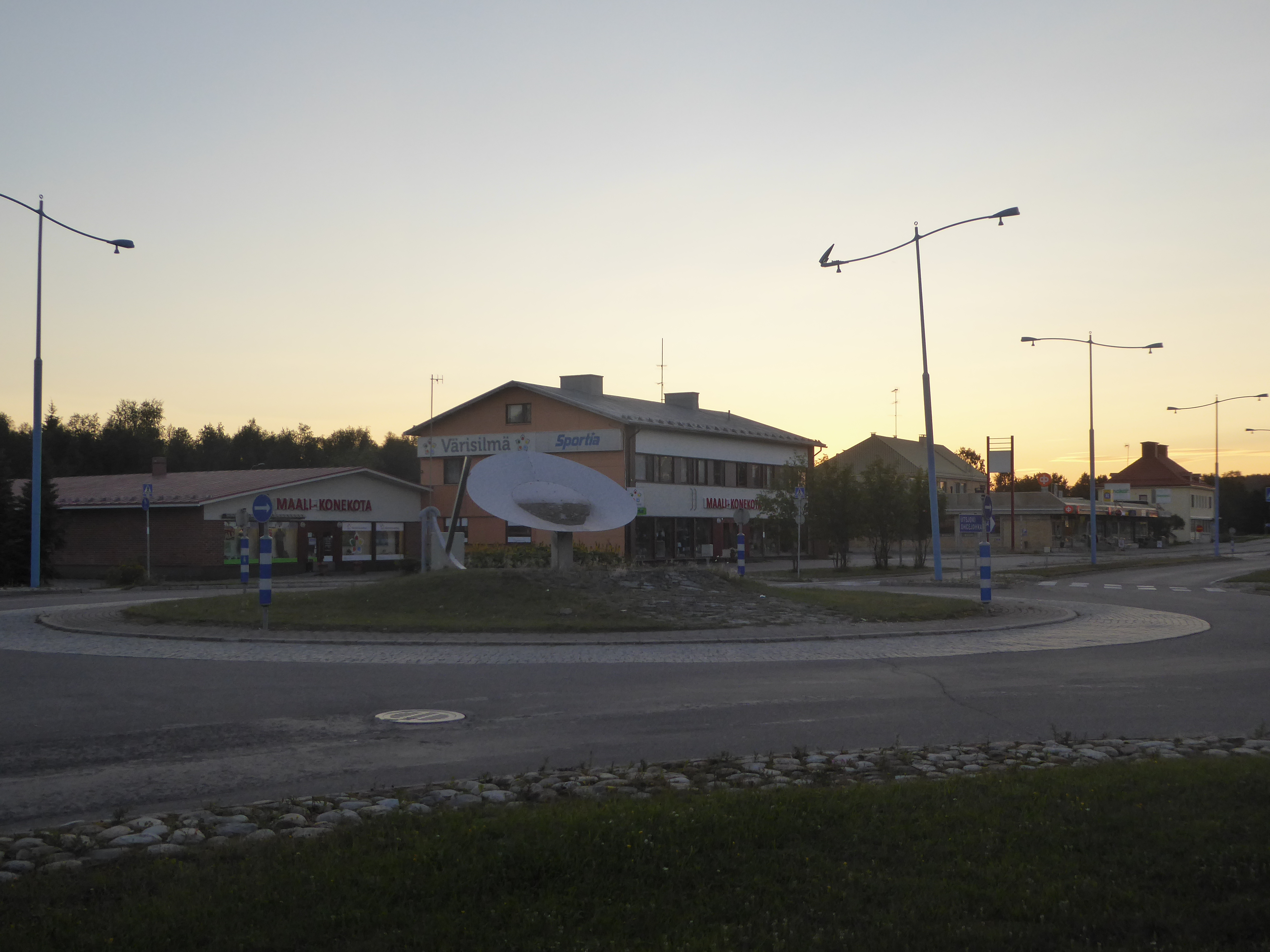
- Roundabout on the Finnish national road 4
- Interactive map of Ivalo
- Location in Finland Ivalo (Finland)
- Coordinates: 68°39′N 027°33′E
- Country: Finland
- Region: Lapland
- Municipality: Inari

Population (2015)
  - Total: 3,062
- Time zone: UTC+2 (EET)
  - Summer (DST): UTC+3 (EEST)

Ivalo (Inari Sami: Avveel, Northern Sami: Avvil, Skolt Sami: Â’vvel, Russian: Ивало) is a village in the municipality of Inari, Lapland, Finland, located on the Ivalo River 20 kilometres (12 mi) south of Lake Inari in the Arctic Circle. It has a population of 3,998 as of 2003 and a small airport, located 11 kilometres (7 mi) southwest from Ivalo. 30 kilometres (19 mi) south of Ivalo is a very popular resort named Saariselkä. The closest border crossing into Russia is about 50 km from Ivalo: the Raja-Jooseppi border station is staffed by Finland's authorities.

== Geography ==
The "midnight sun" is above the horizon from 24 May to 22 July (70 days), and the period with continuous daylight lasts a bit longer. The polar night is from 28 November to 9 January (43 days).

== History ==
The village of Kyrö was established in the 1750s by the Finnish settler Henrik (Heikki) Mikonpoika Kyrö, who came from the Torne Valley. Before settling in Inari, he spent some time in Enontekiö and Kittilä.

Ivalo was officially a separate village since the mid-19th century, but the name only gained wide usage in the early 20th century. Some people in Inari also knew it as Iivalo. Ivalo started growing after a road leading to Petsamo was built. Kyrö had been fully merged into Ivalo by 1940.

Ivalo was severely damaged during the Lapland War (1944–1945) by the retreating German troops led by Generaloberst Lothar Rendulic. The village was subsequently extensively rebuilt.

== Tourist destination ==
Many tourists visit this place every year for winter sports (downhill and cross-country skiing, snowboarding, husky and reindeer sledge riding) and for summer activities (trekking and hiking in the Saariselkä fjells, canoeing in Lapland's rivers, mountain biking, panning for gold, fishing, etc.).

== Notable people ==
- Kati-Claudia Fofonoff (1947–2011), Skolt author and translator
- Anni-Kristiina Juuso (born 1979), actress
- Kari Väänänen (born 1953), actor

== Gallery ==
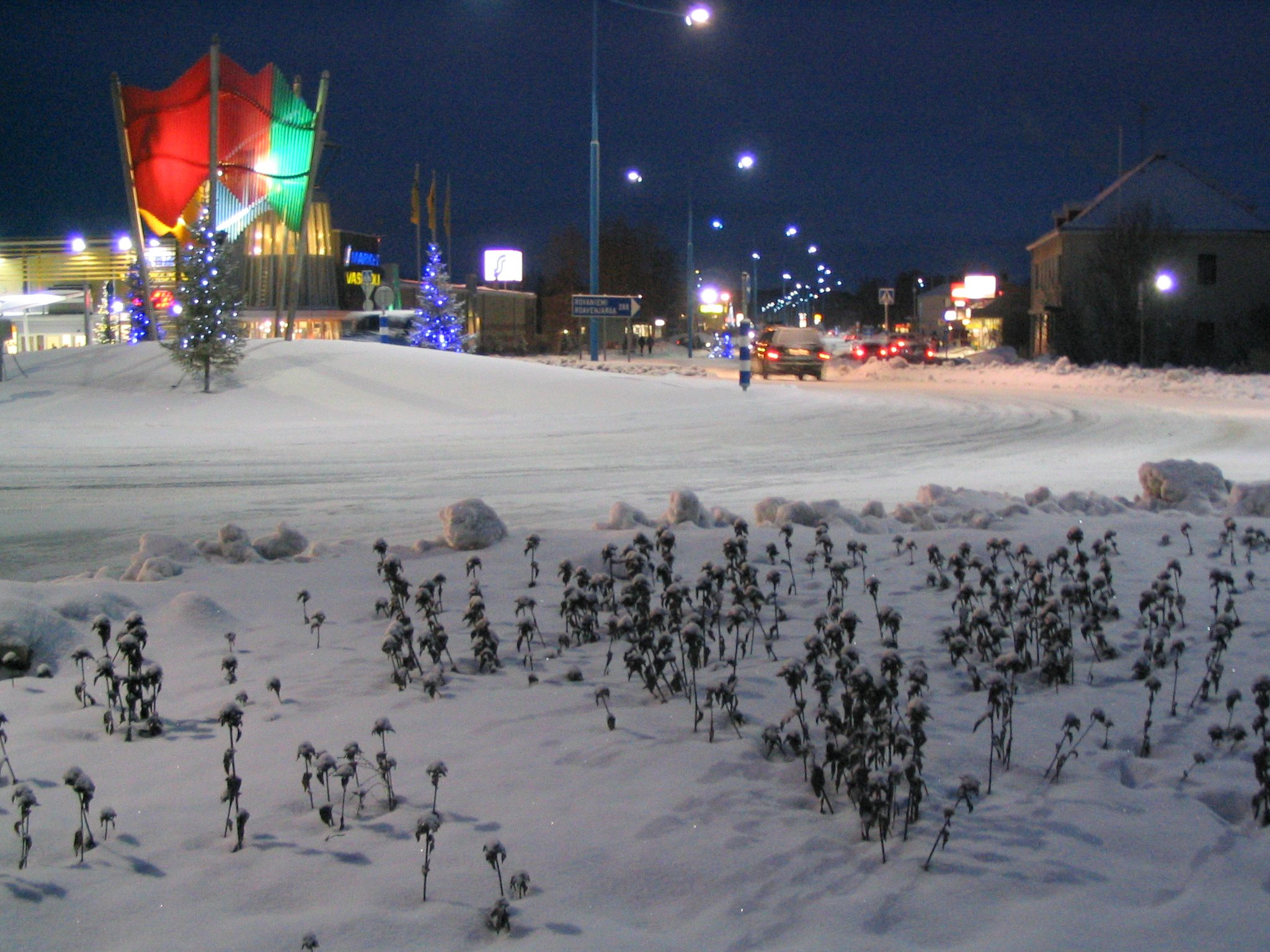
The roundabout for Finnish national road 4 in downtown Ivalo

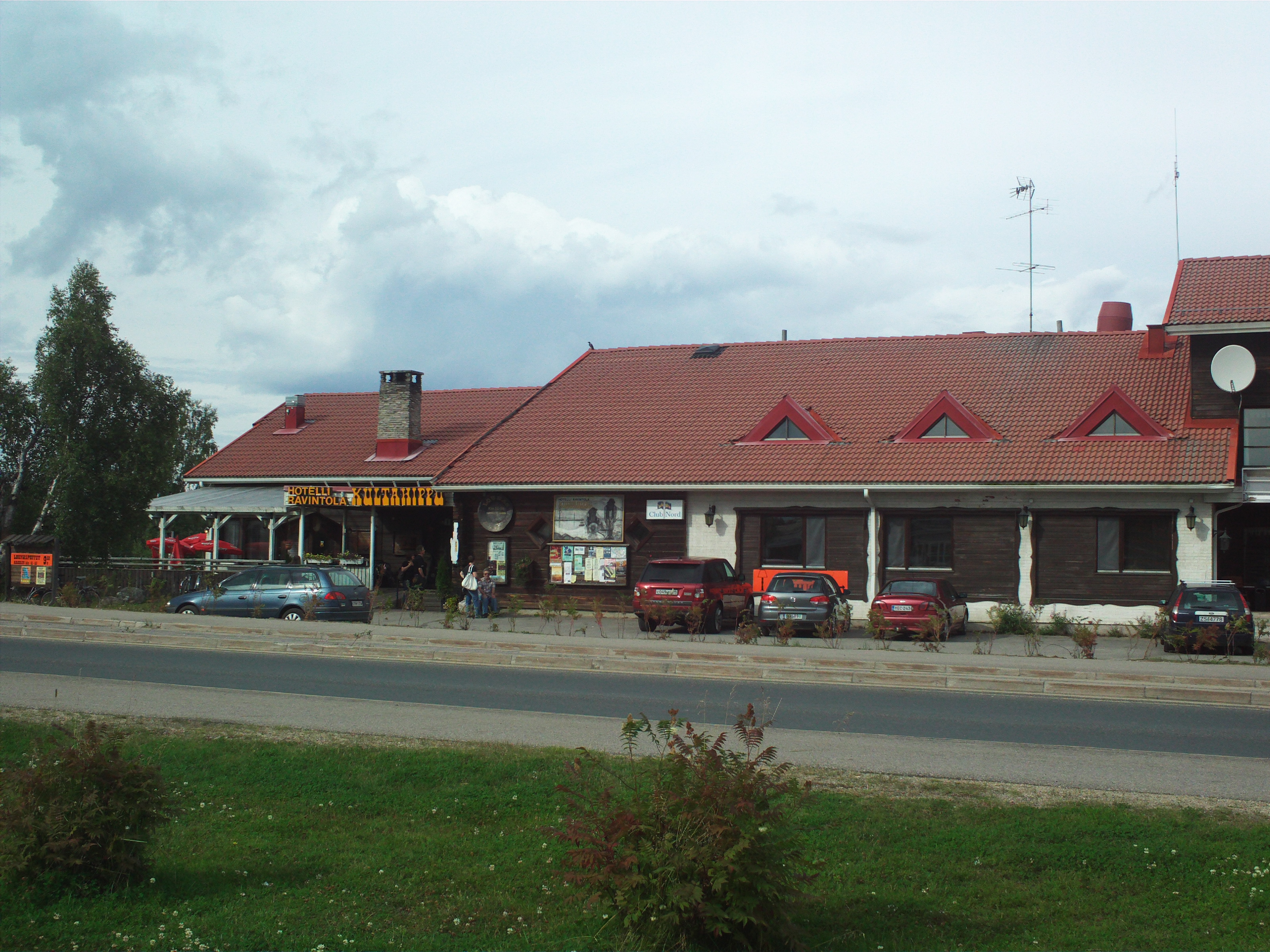
The restaurant hotel Kultahippu

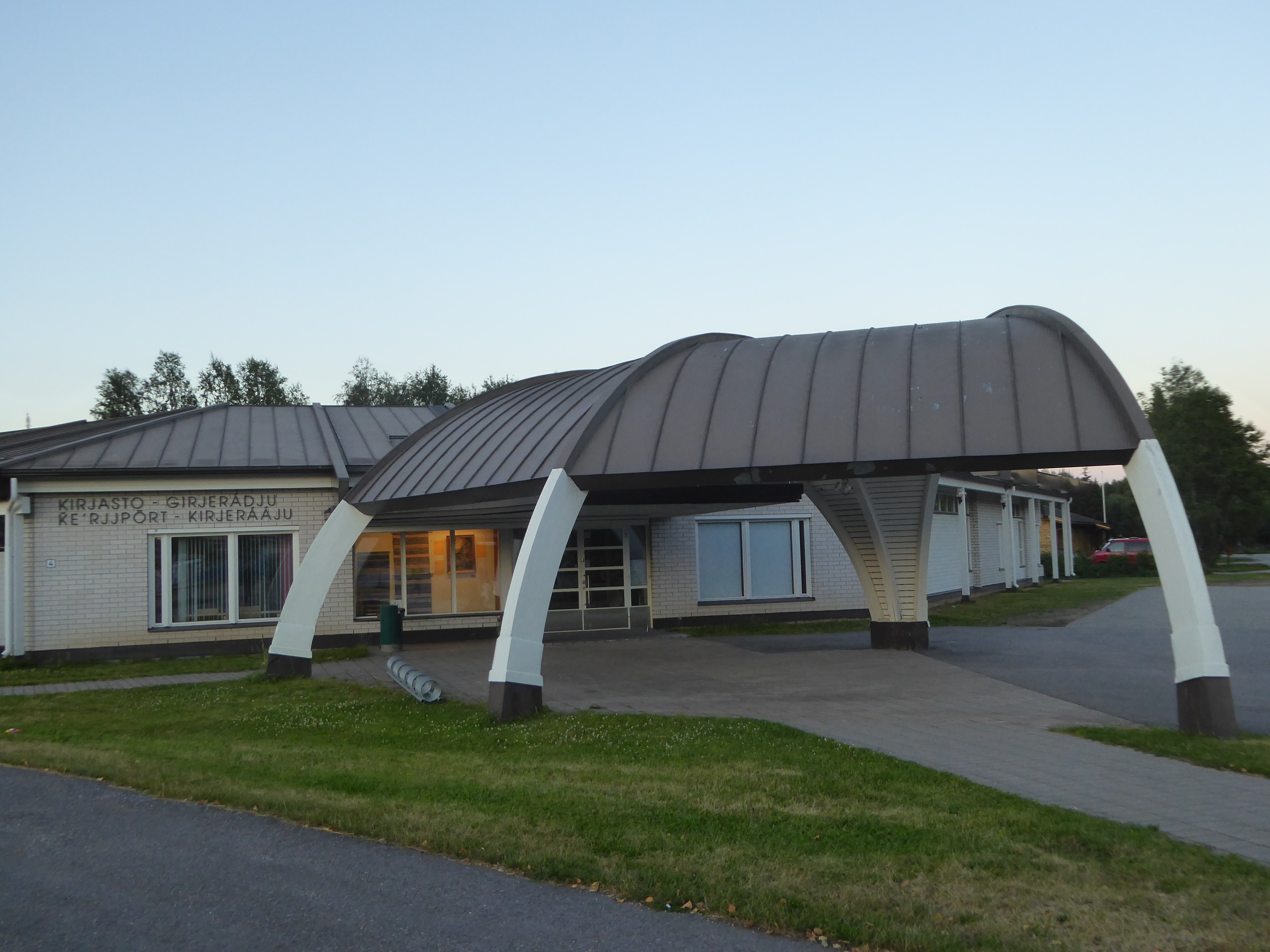
Ivalo library

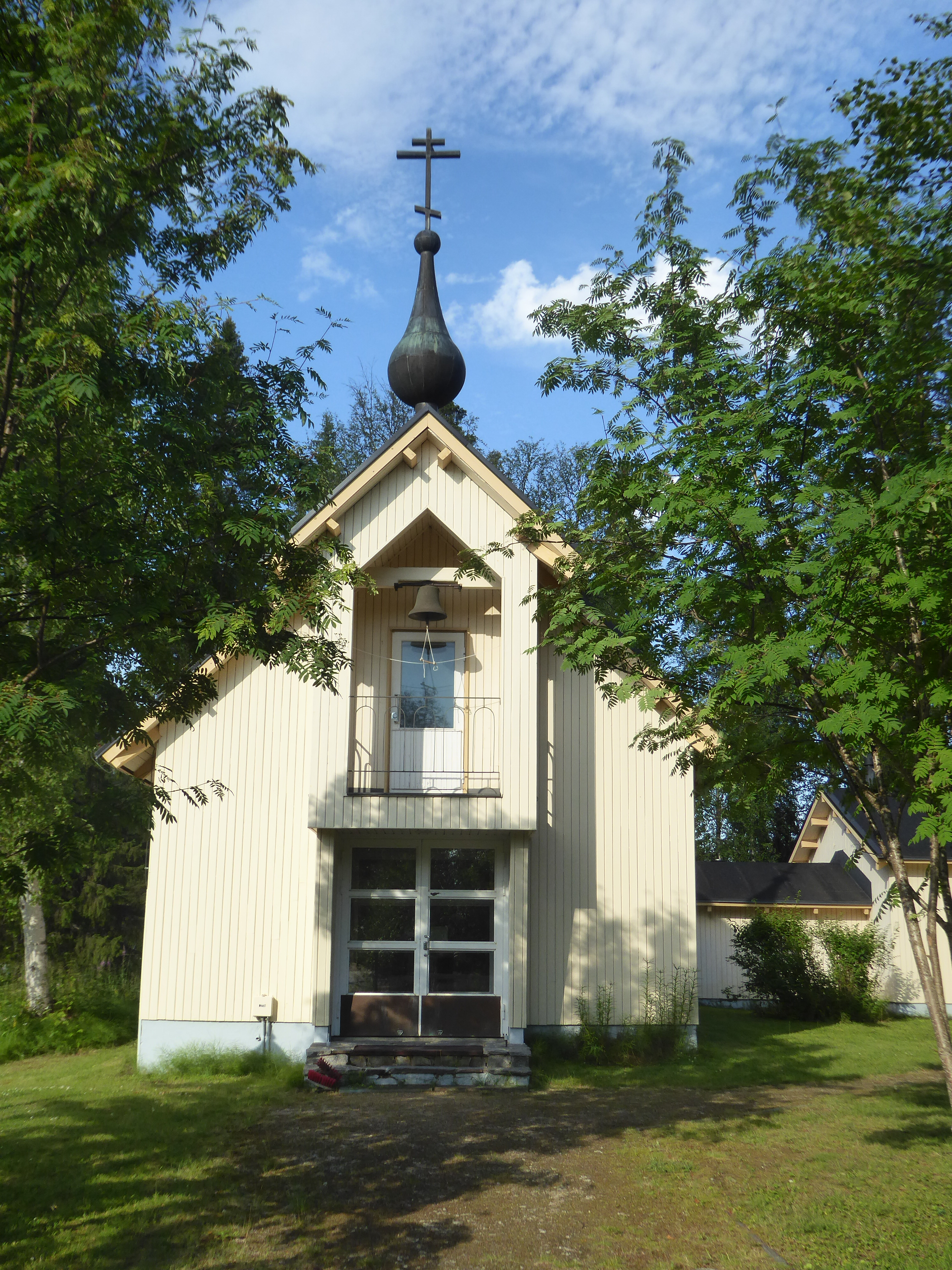
St. Nicholas Orthodox Church

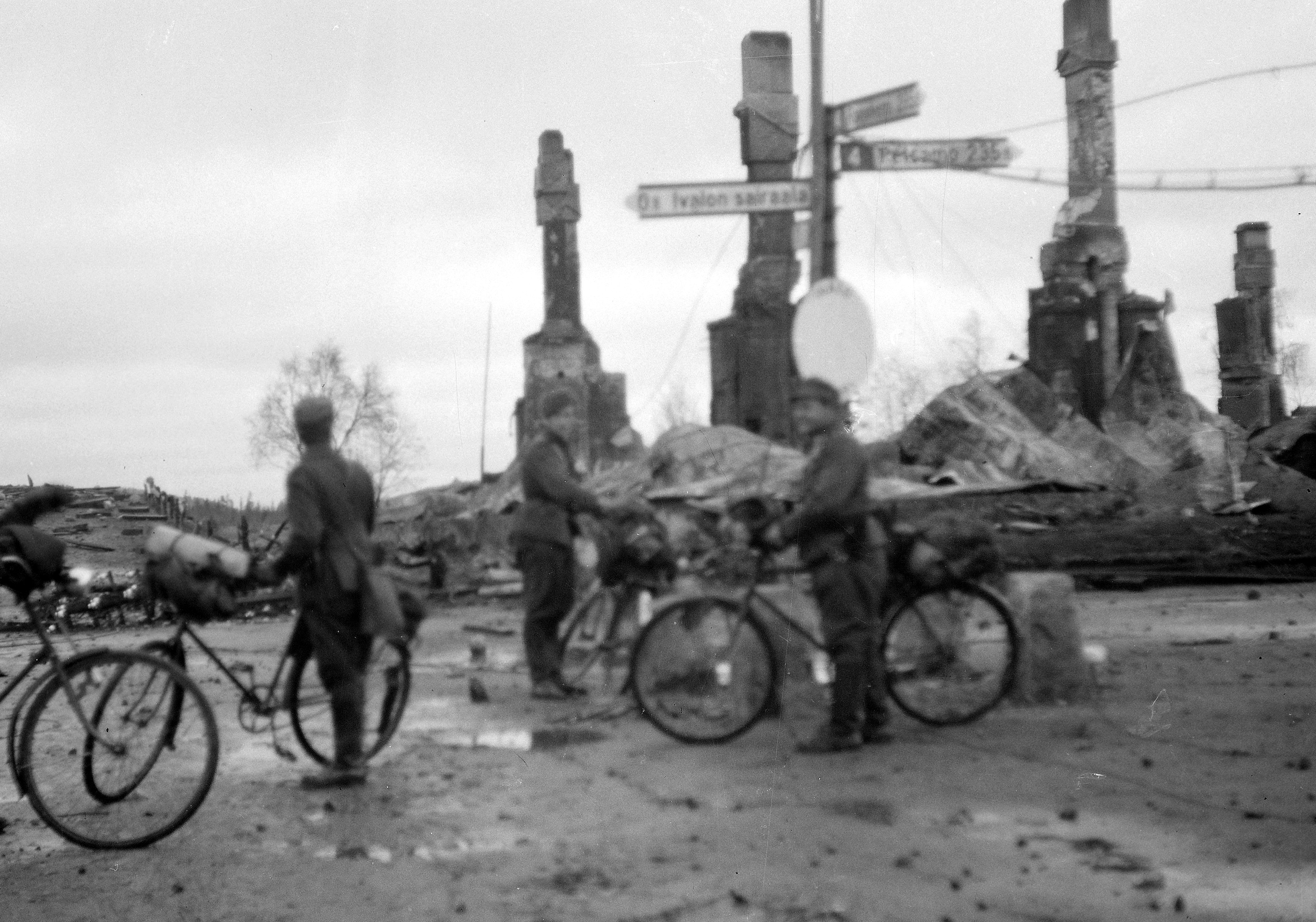
Ivalo in 1945, in the aftermath of the Lapland War

== See also ==
- Inari (village)
