= Sajos =

Sámi cultural and administrative centre

Coordinates: 68°54′20″N 027°01′40″E

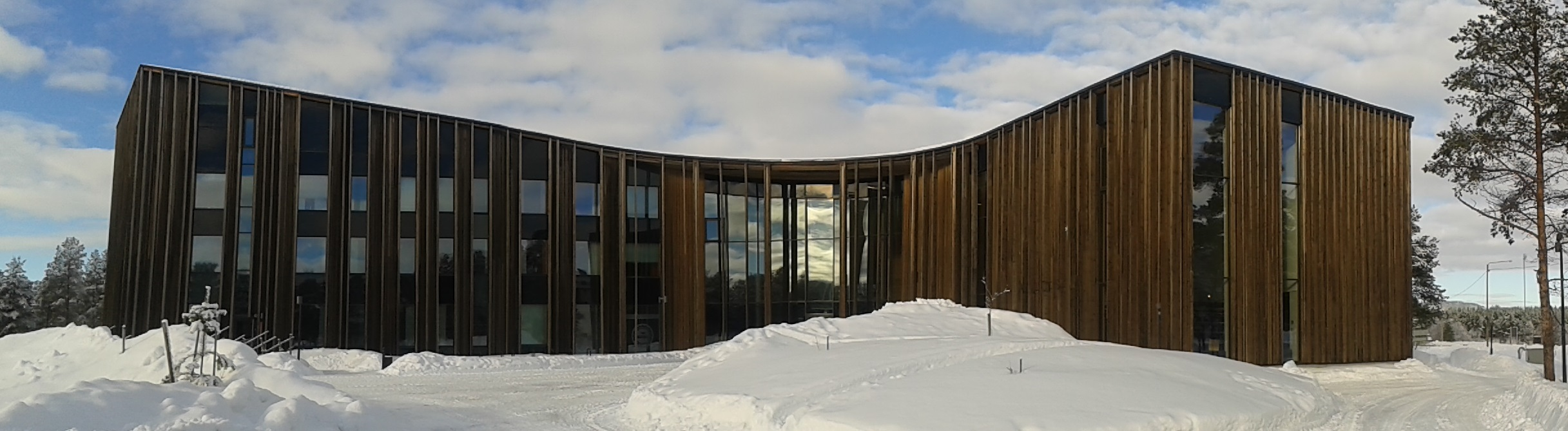
Sajos

Sajos is a Sámi cultural and administrative centre, located on the banks of the Juutuanjoki in Inari, Finland and is the largest convention and event venue in northern Lapland. It houses the Sámi Parliament of Finland, the Sámi Education Centre, the Sámi Archives, the State Provincial Office of Lapland, and a number of other associations.

The building was designed by HALO Architects in Oulu and built by Senate Properties at a cost of 15 million euros. Construction was completed in January 2012 and the building inaugurated in April 2012.

Dark wood on the outside, the three-storey building is covered in white pine. The design of the building was inspired by Sámi traditions, as stipulated in the competition program. The word Sajos comes from the Inari Sámi language and means 'the base' or 'the position of a place'; it was suggested by Matti Morottaja.

The project was finally launched in 1996 with the establishment of the Sámi Parliament of Finland.
