= Inari, Finland =

Inari Inari (Finnish) Aanaar (Inari Sami) Aanar (Skolt Sami) Anár (Northern Sami) Enare (Swedish)
- Municipality
- Inarin kunta (Finnish); Aanaar kieldâ (Inari Sami); Aanar kåʹdd (Skolt Sami); Anára gielda (Northern Sami); Enare kommun (Swedish)
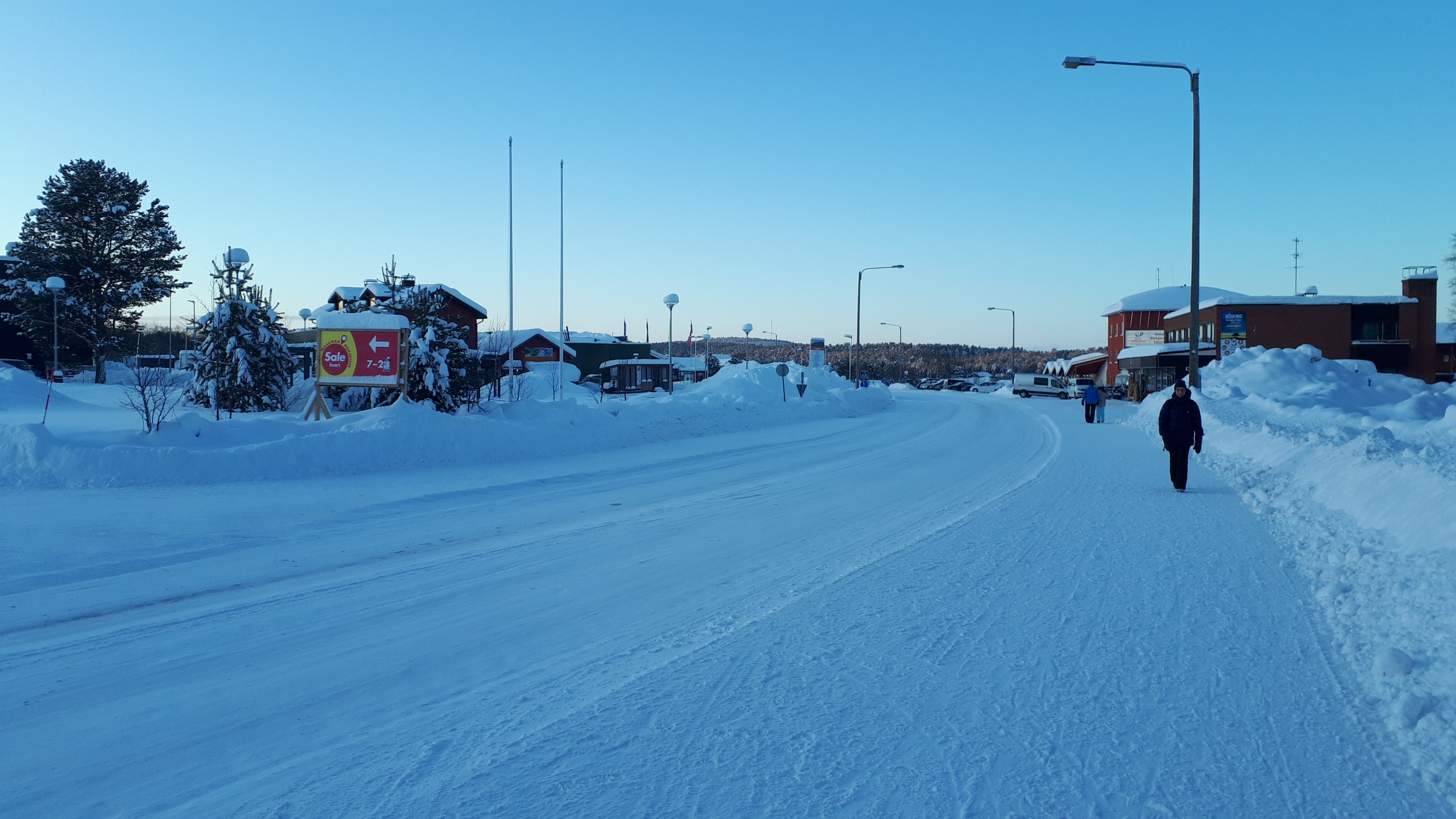
- The snowy main road 4 (E75) in the Inari village

- Coat of arms

- Location of Inari in Finland
- Interactive map of Inari
- Coordinates: 68°54′18″N 027°01′49″E
- Country: Finland
- Region: Lapland
- Sub-region: Northern Lapland
- Charter: 1876
- Seat: Ivalo

Government
  - Municipal manager: Tommi Kasurinen

Area (2018-01-01)
  - Total: 17,333.65 km^{2} (6,692.56 sq mi)
  - Land: 15,060.09 km^{2} (5,814.73 sq mi)
  - Water: 2,281.41 km^{2} (880.86 sq mi)
  - Rank: Largest in Finland

Population (2025-12-31)
  - Total: 7,244
  - Rank: 130th largest in Finland
  - Density: 0.48/km^{2} (1.2/sq mi)

Population by native language
  - Finnish: 86.4% (official)
  - Swedish: 0.4%
  - Sami: 7.1%
  - Others: 6.1%

Population by age
  - 0 to 14: 12.1%
  - 15 to 64: 61%
  - 65 or older: 26.9%
- Time zone: UTC+02:00 (EET)
  - Summer (DST): UTC+03:00 (EEST)
- Website: www.inari.fi/en/

Inari (Note: Finnish pronunciation: [ˈinɑri]; Inari Sami: Aanaar; [ˈɑːnɑːr]; Skolt Sami: Aanar; [ˈɑːnɑr]; Northern Sami: Anár; [ˈɑnar]; Norwegian and Swedish: Enare) is Finland's largest municipality by area (but one of the most sparsely populated), with four official languages, more than any other in the country. Its major sources of income are tourism, service industry, and cold climate testing. With the Siida museum in the village of Inari, it is a center of Sámi culture, widely known as the "capital of Sámi culture".

The airport in Ivalo and the north-south European Route E75 (Finland's National Road 4) brings in seasonal tourists.

== History ==
The municipality was established in 1876. It was claimed from about 1942 to 1945 by the Quisling regime during the Nazi occupation of Norway.

== Geography ==
Inari is the largest municipality by area in Finland. Located in Lapland, it covers an area of 17,333.65 square kilometres (6,692.56 sq mi), of which 2,281.41 km^{2} (880.86 sq mi) is water. With an area of 1,043 km^{2} (403 sq mi), Lake Inari is the third largest lake in Finland, 40 km^{2} (15 sq mi) smaller than the country's second largest Lake Päijänne.

Finland's largest National Park Lemmenjoki is partly located in Inari, as is the Urho Kekkonen National Park. Vast parts of the municipality are designated wilderness areas: Hammastunturi, Muotkatunturi, Paistunturi, Kaldoaivi, Vätsäri, and Tsarmitunturi.

The village of Inari is Finland's northernmost holiday resort. The airport is located in the nearby village of Ivalo.

=== Climate ===
Inari has a chilly and humid climate with fairly cold winters and cool summers (Köppen Dfc). Due to the polar night, winter time temperatures are often severely cold. However, the midnight sun contributes to surprisingly high summertime temperatures. The warmest temperature ever recorded at Ivalo Airport was 31.8 °C (89.2 °F) in July 1925, while the coldest temperature on record was −48.9 °C (−56.0 °F) in January 1999. However, in July 1914 Thule weather station in western Inari recorded an unofficial record high temperature of 34.7 °C (94.5 °F), which is the highest temperature ever recorded in Lapland. Inari is also among the driest locations in Finland, especially in the winter when the average precipitation total is less than half of the amount that Southern Finland receives. The driest year on record was 1941 when only 120,1 mm (4,7 inches) fell.

Climate data for Inari Nellim, 1991-2020 normals, extremes 1925- present
| Month | Jan | Feb | Mar | Apr | May | Jun | Jul | Aug | Sep | Oct | Nov | Dec | Year |
|---|---|---|---|---|---|---|---|---|---|---|---|---|---|
| Record high °C (°F) | 6.3 (43.3) | 6.9 (44.4) | 11.0 (51.8) | 16.4 (61.5) | 28.2 (82.8) | 31.7 (89.1) | 31.8 (89.2) | 31.4 (88.5) | 24.4 (75.9) | 12.8 (55.0) | 8.6 (47.5) | 7.4 (45.3) | 31.8 (89.2) |
| Mean daily maximum °C (°F) | −7.6 (18.3) | −7.3 (18.9) | −2.4 (27.7) | 2.9 (37.2) | 8.8 (47.8) | 15.0 (59.0) | 18.7 (65.7) | 15.9 (60.6) | 10.5 (50.9) | 3.0 (37.4) | −2.5 (27.5) | −5.2 (22.6) | 4.2 (39.6) |
| Daily mean °C (°F) | −12.1 (10.2) | −11.6 (11.1) | −7.2 (19.0) | −1.3 (29.7) | 4.5 (40.1) | 10.4 (50.7) | 14.2 (57.6) | 11.9 (53.4) | 7.2 (45.0) | 0.7 (33.3) | −5.6 (21.9) | −9.2 (15.4) | 0.2 (32.4) |
| Mean daily minimum °C (°F) | −17.4 (0.7) | −16.8 (1.8) | −12.9 (8.8) | −6.1 (21.0) | 0.4 (32.7) | 6.3 (43.3) | 10.0 (50.0) | 8.0 (46.4) | 3.8 (38.8) | −2.0 (28.4) | −9.3 (15.3) | −13.8 (7.2) | −4.2 (24.4) |
| Record low °C (°F) | −48.9 (−56.0) | −48.6 (−55.5) | −39.9 (−39.8) | −29.8 (−21.6) | −15.8 (3.6) | −3.3 (26.1) | −0.1 (31.8) | −3.5 (25.7) | −11.6 (11.1) | −27.6 (−17.7) | −34.3 (−29.7) | −42.0 (−43.6) | −48.9 (−56.0) |
| Average precipitation mm (inches) | 25 (1.0) | 21 (0.8) | 22 (0.9) | 26 (1.0) | 37 (1.5) | 61 (2.4) | 73 (2.9) | 69 (2.7) | 45 (1.8) | 43 (1.7) | 28 (1.1) | 26 (1.0) | 476 (18.8) |
| Average precipitation days (≥ 0.1 mm) | 16 | 14 | 13 | 13 | 15 | 15 | 17 | 17 | 16 | 17 | 16 | 17 | 186 |
Source 1: FMI climatological normals for Finland 1991-2020
Source 2: record highs and lows 1961–present FMI(record highs and lows 1925-1961)

Climate data for Ivalo Airport (1991-2020 normals, extremes 1959- present)
| Month | Jan | Feb | Mar | Apr | May | Jun | Jul | Aug | Sep | Oct | Nov | Dec | Year |
|---|---|---|---|---|---|---|---|---|---|---|---|---|---|
| Record high °C (°F) | 6.3 (43.3) | 6.9 (44.4) | 9.5 (49.1) | 16.7 (62.1) | 28.2 (82.8) | 31.7 (89.1) | 31.6 (88.9) | 31.4 (88.5) | 21.9 (71.4) | 13.3 (55.9) | 9.3 (48.7) | 7.4 (45.3) | 31.7 (89.1) |
| Mean daily maximum °C (°F) | −7.9 (17.8) | −7.4 (18.7) | −2.2 (28.0) | 3.2 (37.8) | 9.3 (48.7) | 15.4 (59.7) | 19.1 (66.4) | 16.4 (61.5) | 10.7 (51.3) | 2.8 (37.0) | −2.8 (27.0) | −5.6 (21.9) | 4.3 (39.7) |
| Daily mean °C (°F) | −11.8 (10.8) | −11.4 (11.5) | −6.8 (19.8) | −1.0 (30.2) | 4.9 (40.8) | 10.8 (51.4) | 14.3 (57.7) | 11.9 (53.4) | 7.0 (44.6) | 0.2 (32.4) | −5.7 (21.7) | −9.1 (15.6) | 0.3 (32.5) |
| Mean daily minimum °C (°F) | −16.5 (2.3) | −16.1 (3.0) | −12.3 (9.9) | −5.8 (21.6) | 0.5 (32.9) | 6.4 (43.5) | 9.9 (49.8) | 7.8 (46.0) | 3.5 (38.3) | −2.4 (27.7) | −9.3 (15.3) | −13.3 (8.1) | −4.0 (24.8) |
| Record low °C (°F) | −48.9 (−56.0) | −48.6 (−55.5) | −39.9 (−39.8) | −29.8 (−21.6) | −18.3 (−0.9) | −3.3 (26.1) | −0.1 (31.8) | −3.6 (25.5) | −11.6 (11.1) | −27.6 (−17.7) | −37.5 (−35.5) | −40.6 (−41.1) | −48.9 (−56.0) |
| Average precipitation mm (inches) | 25 (1.0) | 23 (0.9) | 22 (0.9) | 27 (1.1) | 37 (1.5) | 59 (2.3) | 70 (2.8) | 71 (2.8) | 48 (1.9) | 43 (1.7) | 31 (1.2) | 29 (1.1) | 485 (19.1) |
| Average precipitation days (≥ 0.1 mm) | 14 | 13 | 11 | 12 | 13 | 14 | 15 | 16 | 14 | 14 | 14 | 14 | 164 |
| Average relative humidity (%) | 84 | 83 | 78 | 73 | 68 | 67 | 72 | 78 | 82 | 87 | 89 | 86 | 79 |
Source 1: FMI normals 1991-2020
Source 2: Record highs and lows

Climate data for Inari Väylä (1991-2020 normals, extremes 1993-2025)
| Month | Jan | Feb | Mar | Apr | May | Jun | Jul | Aug | Sep | Oct | Nov | Dec | Year |
|---|---|---|---|---|---|---|---|---|---|---|---|---|---|
| Record high °C (°F) | 5.3 (41.5) | 6.8 (44.2) | 9.2 (48.6) | 15.6 (60.1) | 28.0 (82.4) | 30.2 (86.4) | 32.0 (89.6) | 32.3 (90.1) | 22.5 (72.5) | 13.6 (56.5) | 11.7 (53.1) | 6.4 (43.5) | 32.3 (90.1) |
| Mean daily maximum °C (°F) | −8.6 (16.5) | −8.1 (17.4) | −2.8 (27.0) | 3.0 (37.4) | 8.7 (47.7) | 14.8 (58.6) | 18.8 (65.8) | 16.0 (60.8) | 10.5 (50.9) | 2.8 (37.0) | −3.1 (26.4) | −5.9 (21.4) | 3.8 (38.8) |
| Daily mean °C (°F) | −13.0 (8.6) | −12.4 (9.7) | −7.7 (18.1) | −1.7 (28.9) | 4.2 (39.6) | 9.9 (49.8) | 13.5 (56.3) | 11.2 (52.2) | 6.5 (43.7) | 0.0 (32.0) | −6.3 (20.7) | −9.9 (14.2) | −0.5 (31.1) |
| Mean daily minimum °C (°F) | −19.1 (−2.4) | −18.8 (−1.8) | −14.0 (6.8) | −6.9 (19.6) | −0.5 (31.1) | 5.1 (41.2) | 8.7 (47.7) | 6.6 (43.9) | 2.4 (36.3) | −2.9 (26.8) | −10.4 (13.3) | −15.5 (4.1) | −5.4 (22.3) |
| Record low °C (°F) | −49.5 (−57.1) | −42.7 (−44.9) | −39.1 (−38.4) | −29.0 (−20.2) | −19.8 (−3.6) | −3.5 (25.7) | −1.1 (30.0) | −3.5 (25.7) | −8.4 (16.9) | −22.8 (−9.0) | −35.5 (−31.9) | −40.2 (−40.4) | −49.5 (−57.1) |
Source 1: https://www.ilmatieteenlaitos.fi/1991-2020-lampotilatilastot
Source 2: https://kilotavu.com/asema-taulukko.php?asema=102042

== Demographics ==
Historical population
| Year | Pop. | ±% |
|---|---|---|
| 1972 | 6,841 | — |
| 1980 | 6,900 | +0.9% |
| 1990 | 7,559 | +9.6% |
| 2000 | 7,360 | −2.6% |
| 2010 | 6,778 | −7.9% |
| 2020 | 6,862 | +1.2% |
| 2023 | 7,160 | +4.3% |

=== Population ===
The municipality of Inari has a population of 7,244 (31 December 2025). The population density is 0.48 inhabitants per square kilometre (1.2/sq mi). The population peaked in 1993, at 7,874. It then decreased continuously until 2012, when the population was 6,732. Since then it has steadily increased to 7,160 in 2024. Inari is expected to be the only municipality in Lapland, along with Rovaniemi, that will experience population growth by 2040. This has been attributed to increased tourism.

Its two largest villages are Ivalo and Inari. Other villages are Törmänen, Keväjärvi, Koppelo, Sevettijärvi–Näätämö, Saariselkä, Nellim, Angeli, Kaamanen, Kuttura, Lisma, Partakko, and Riutula.

The registered Sámi population in Inari from the 2019 election was 2,141, which was 31% of Inari's population.

=== Languages ===
The municipality has four official languages: Finnish, Inari Sámi (c. 400 estimated speakers), Skolt Sámi (c. 400 speakers), and Northern Sámi (c. 700 speakers). The estimates of how many people have some command of each of the Sámi languages differ from the number of people who list them as their mother tongues. Of the total population of 7,008 in 2021, 6,249 people registered Finnish (87.68%) and 492 people registered one of the Sámi languages as their mother tongue (6.90%). Swedish is the mother tongue of 28 individuals (0.39%) and 358 people (5.02%) speak foreign languages. The most-spoken foreign languages are: Russian (0.95%), German (0.60%), French (0.35%), English (0.35%), Thai (0.34%), Tagalog (0.29%) and Dutch (0.25%).

Mother tongue in Inari
Language
| Language | 1990 | 2000 | 2010 | 2020 | 2023 |
|---|---|---|---|---|---|
| Finnish | 94.02% | 93.15% | 92.53% | 89.35% | 87.68% |
| Sámi | 5.46% | 5.84% | 5.98% | 6.68% | 6.90% |
| Swedish | 0.19% | 0.31% | 0.30% | 0.31% | 0.39% |
| Other | 0.33% | 0.69% | 1.20% | 3.27% | 5.02% |

=== Citizenship ===
Only about three percent, 214 persons, were citizens of countries other than Finland in 2022. The largest groups of foreign-citizens are from Russia (39 individuals), Germany (24), France (18), the Netherlands (14), Thailand (13) and Estonia (11).

== Politics ==
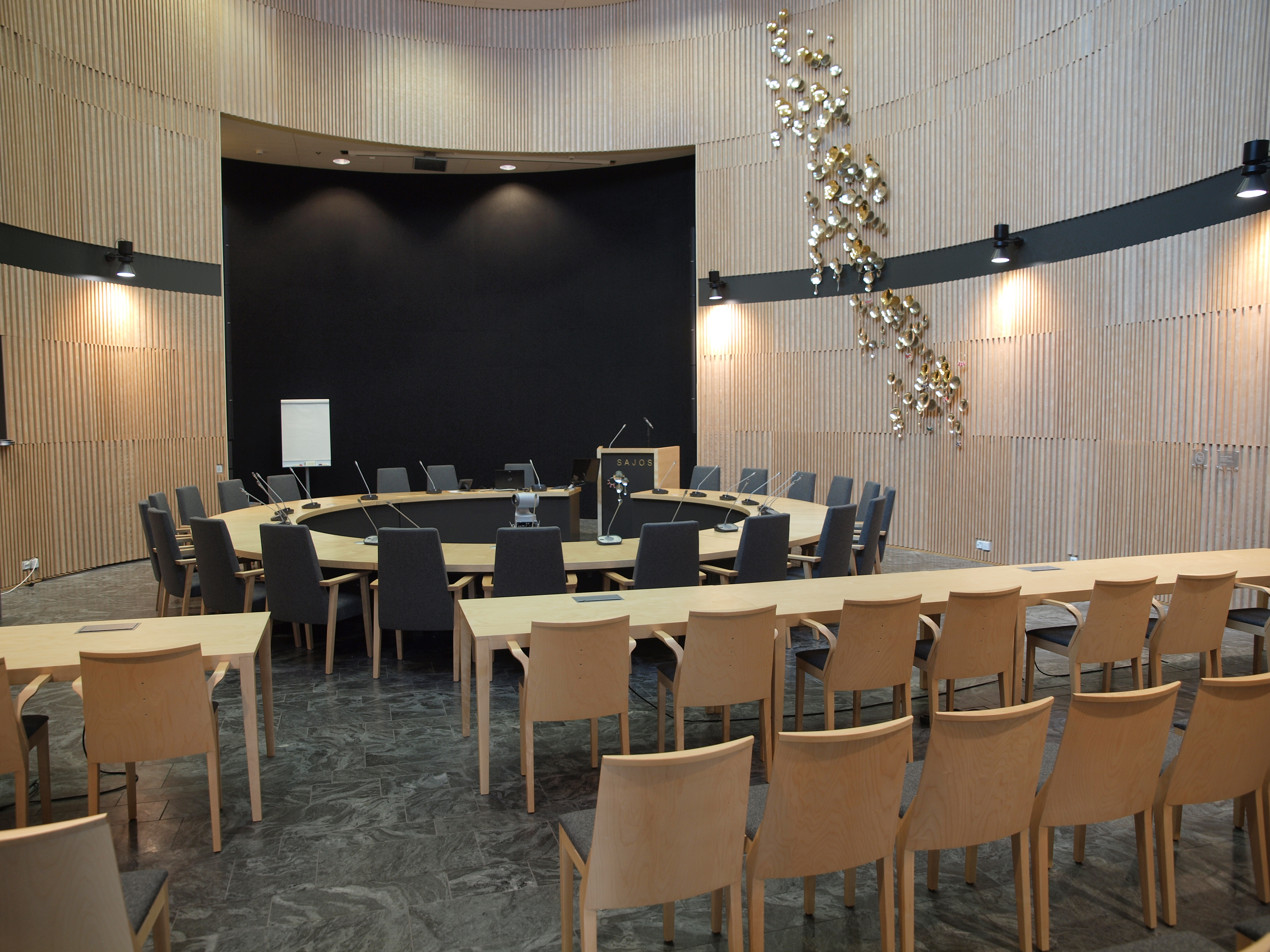
The Sámi Parliament Chamber

Results of the 2023 Finnish parliamentary election in Inari:

- Finns Party 27.9%
- Social Democratic Party 22.8%
- Centre Party 16.1%
- National Coalition Party 15.3%
- Left Alliance 7.4%
- Green League 5.3%
- Swedish People's Party 1.5%
- Christian Democrats 1.4%
- Other parties 2.3%

== Sites of interest ==
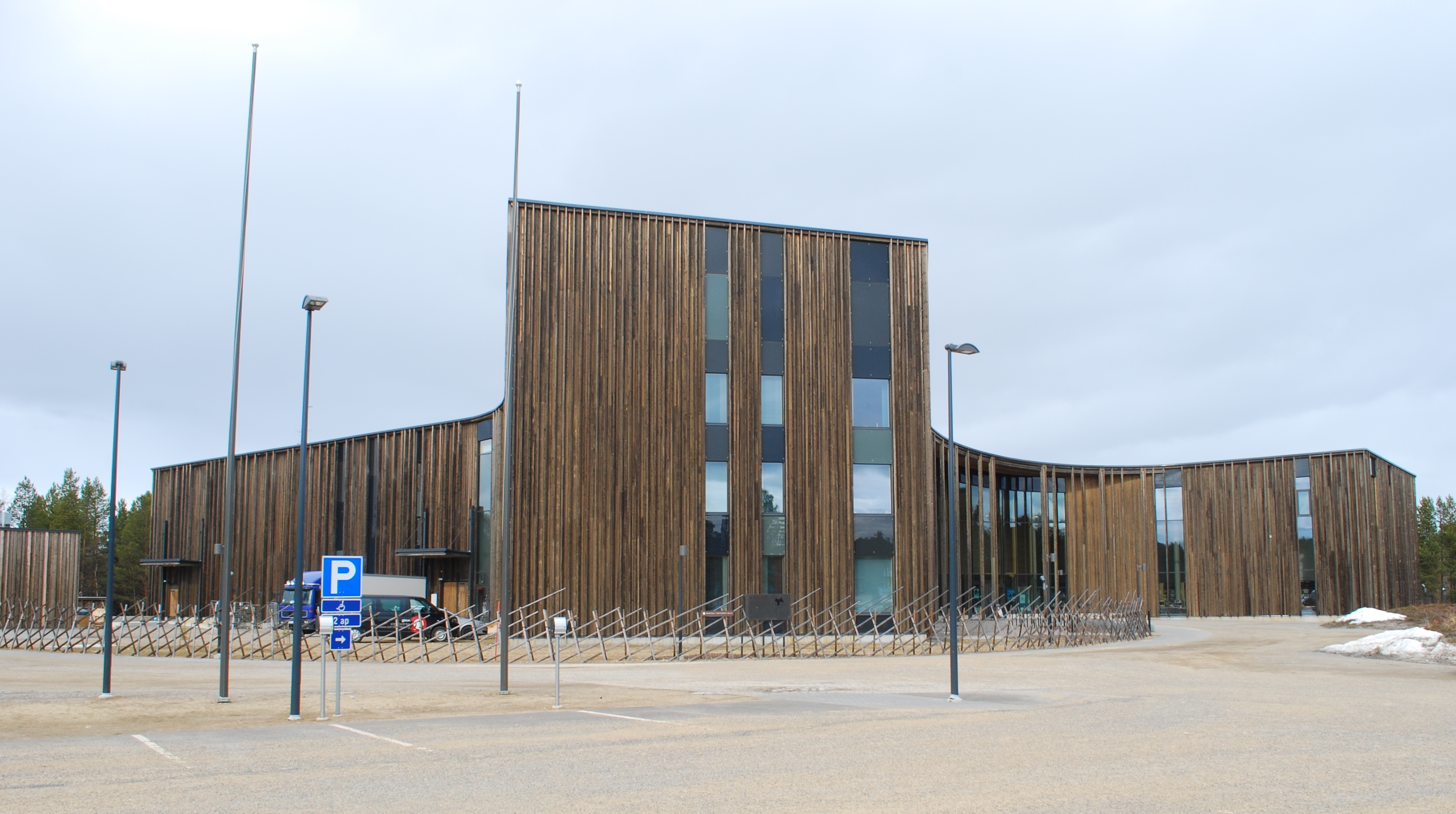
Sajos, the Sámi Cultural Center in the Inari village

- Inari village
  - Siida, Sámi Museum and Northern Lapland Nature Centre
  - Sajos, Sámi Cultural Center
- Ivalo village
  - Ivalo Airport
  - Ivalo river
- Saariselkä holiday resort
- Urho Kekkonen National Park
- Lemmenjoki National Park
- Hammastunturi Wilderness Area
- Otsamo fell, a popular hiking destination

== Notable people ==
- Amoc (born 1984), rapper
- Pauliina Feodoroff (born 1977), Skolt filmmaker
- Jenni Laiti (born 1981), Sámi artist
- Matti Morottaja (born 1942), Sámi author and politician
- Petter Morottaja (born 1982), Sámi author and translator
- Mikkel Näkkäläjärvi (born 1990), politician
- Marja-Liisa Olthuis (born 1967), linguist
- Janne Seurujärvi (born 1975), Sámi politician

== See also ==
- Utsjoki
