= Inari (village) =

Inari Inari (Finnish) Aanar (Inari Sami)
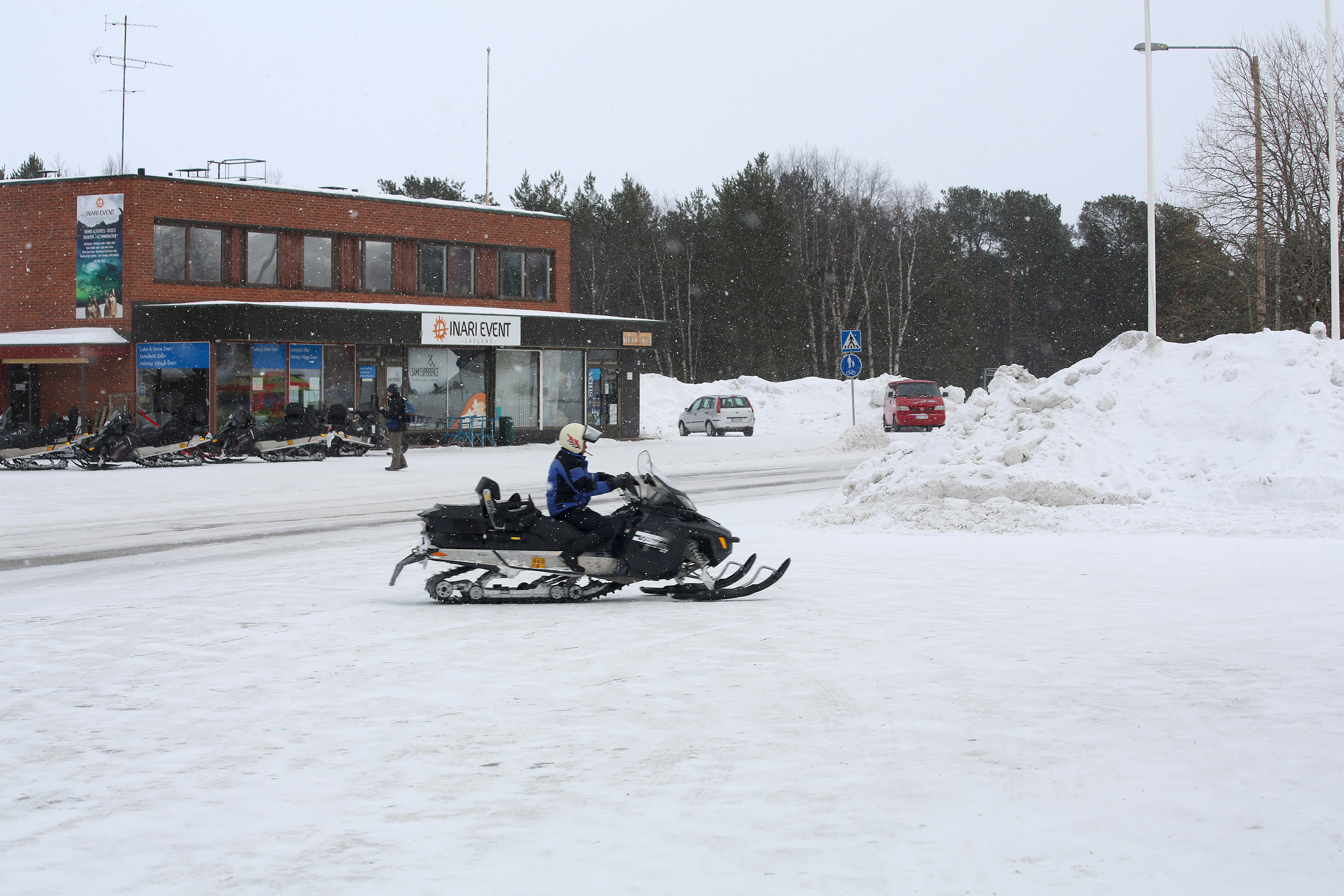
- Interactive map of Inari
- Location in Lapland, Finland Location in Finland
- Coordinates: 68°54′20″N 27°01′40″E
- Country: Finland
- Region: Lapland
- Municipality: Inari

Population (2014)
  - Total: 581
- Time zone: UTC+2 (EET)

Inari is a population centre in the municipality by the same name in Lapland, Finland. It is widely known as the capital of Finnish Sámi culture.

== History ==
The village grew up along in a spot where the fast-flowing Juutua River empties into Lake Inari. As the centuries went by, the village developed into a robust and active market and trade centre. When the municipality of Inari was founded in 1876, the village became its centre.

The people living in Inari then were not, however, the first people to live in the village, as people had been living on the shores of Lake Inari for thousands of years before that. Several stone-age dwellings have been found in Vuopaja, on the edge of town near Siida, the Sámi Museum.

== Gallery ==
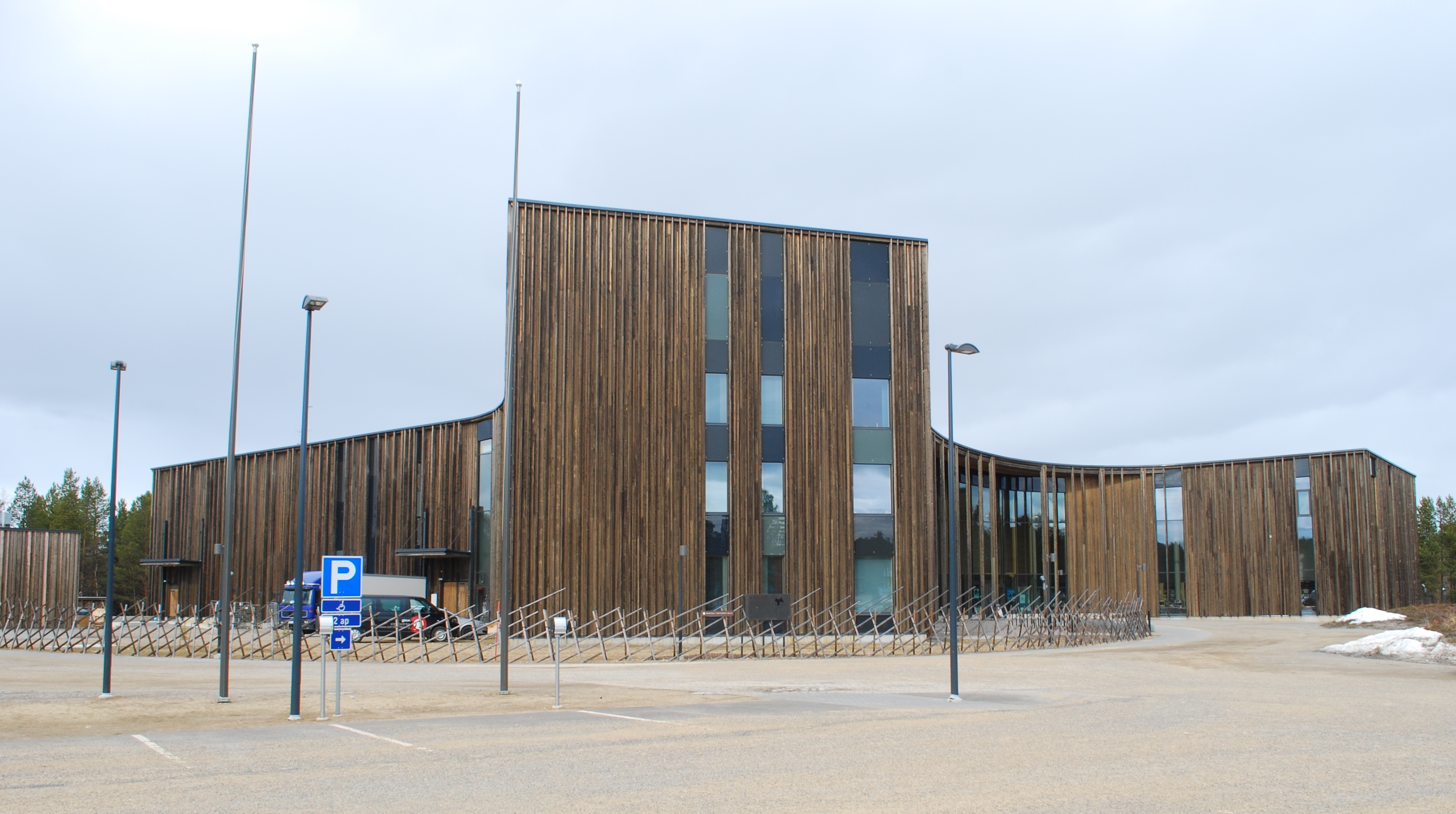
Sajos, the Sami Cultural Center in the Inari village

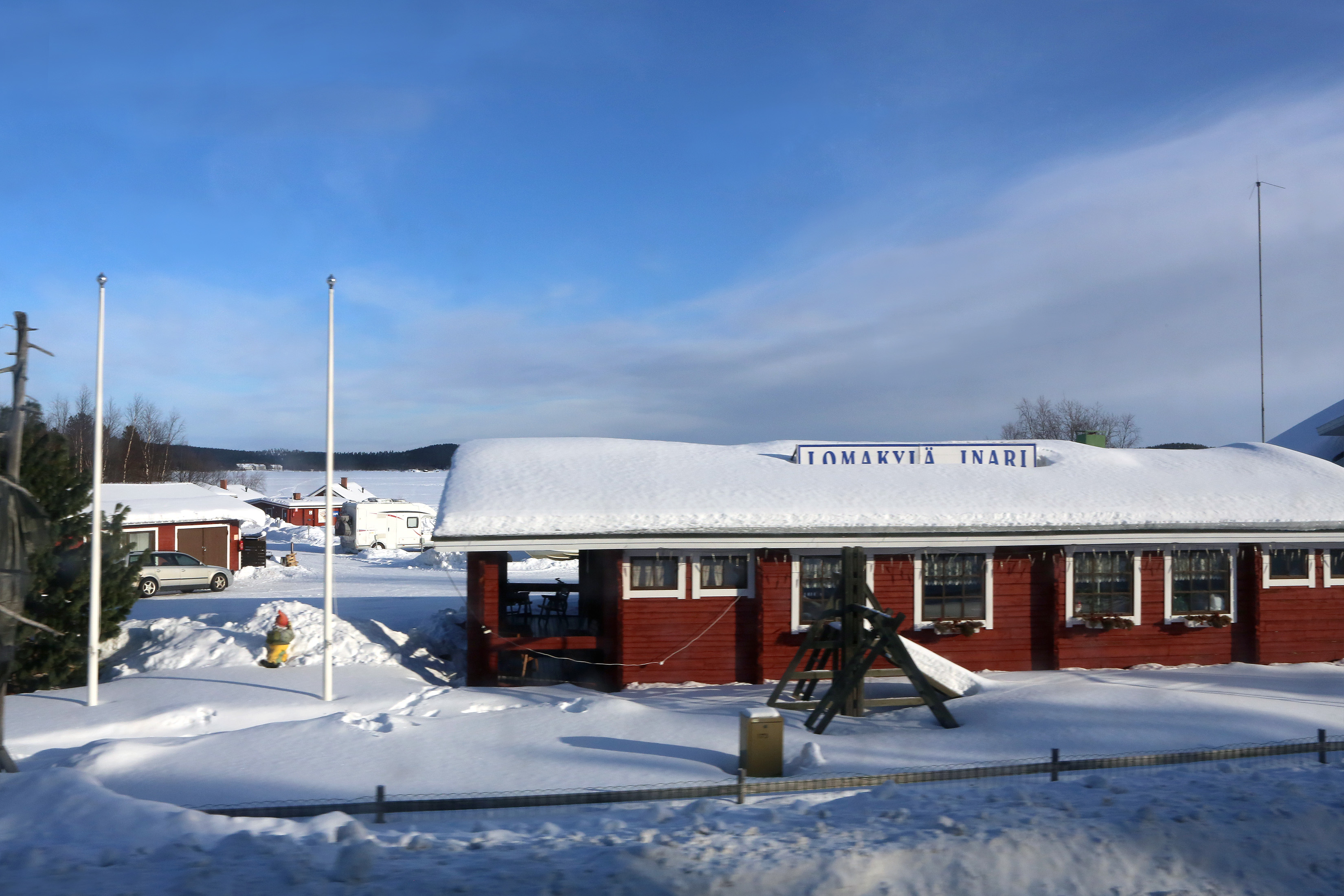
Snow in Inari

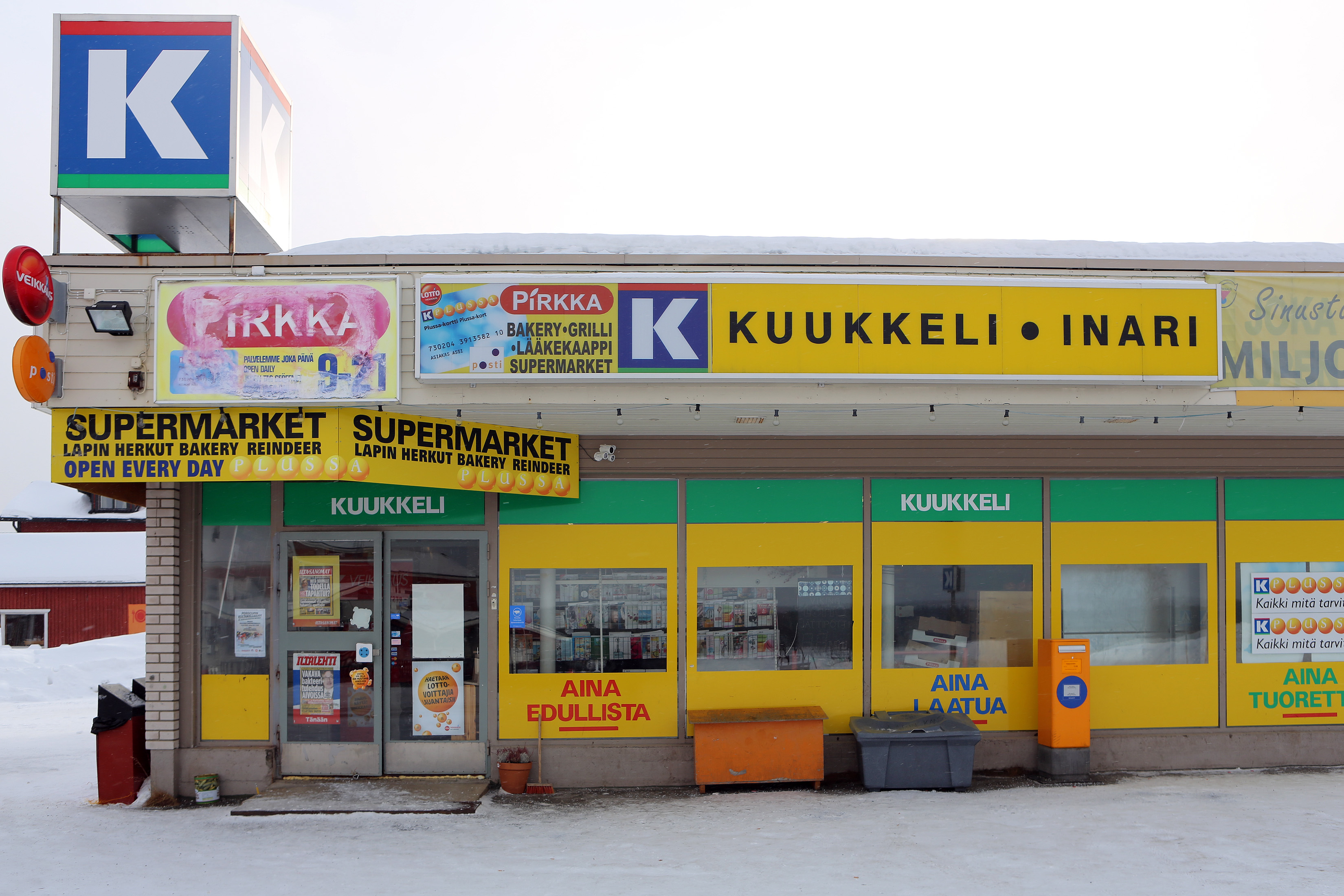
Supermarket in Inari

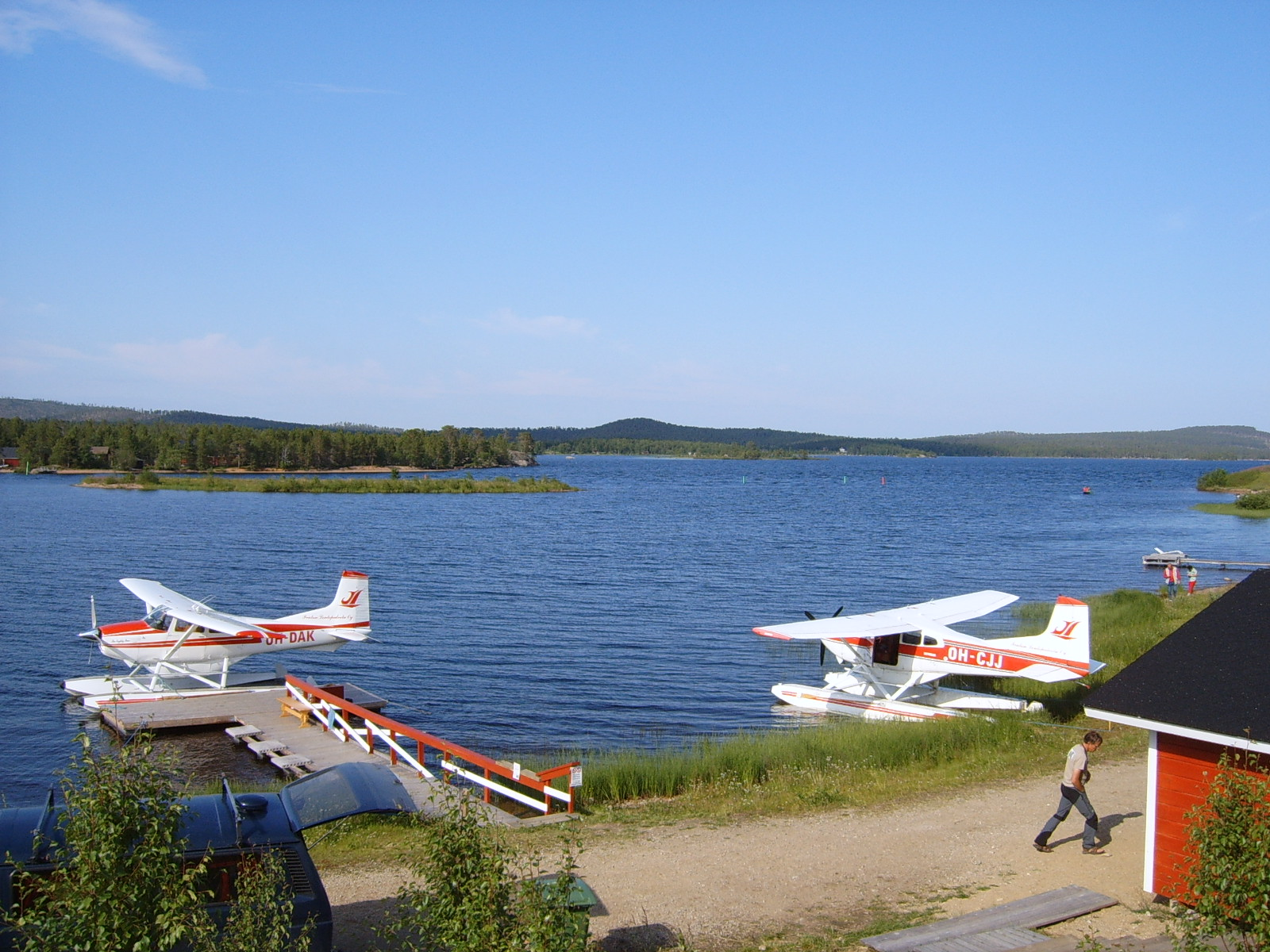
Inari Lake

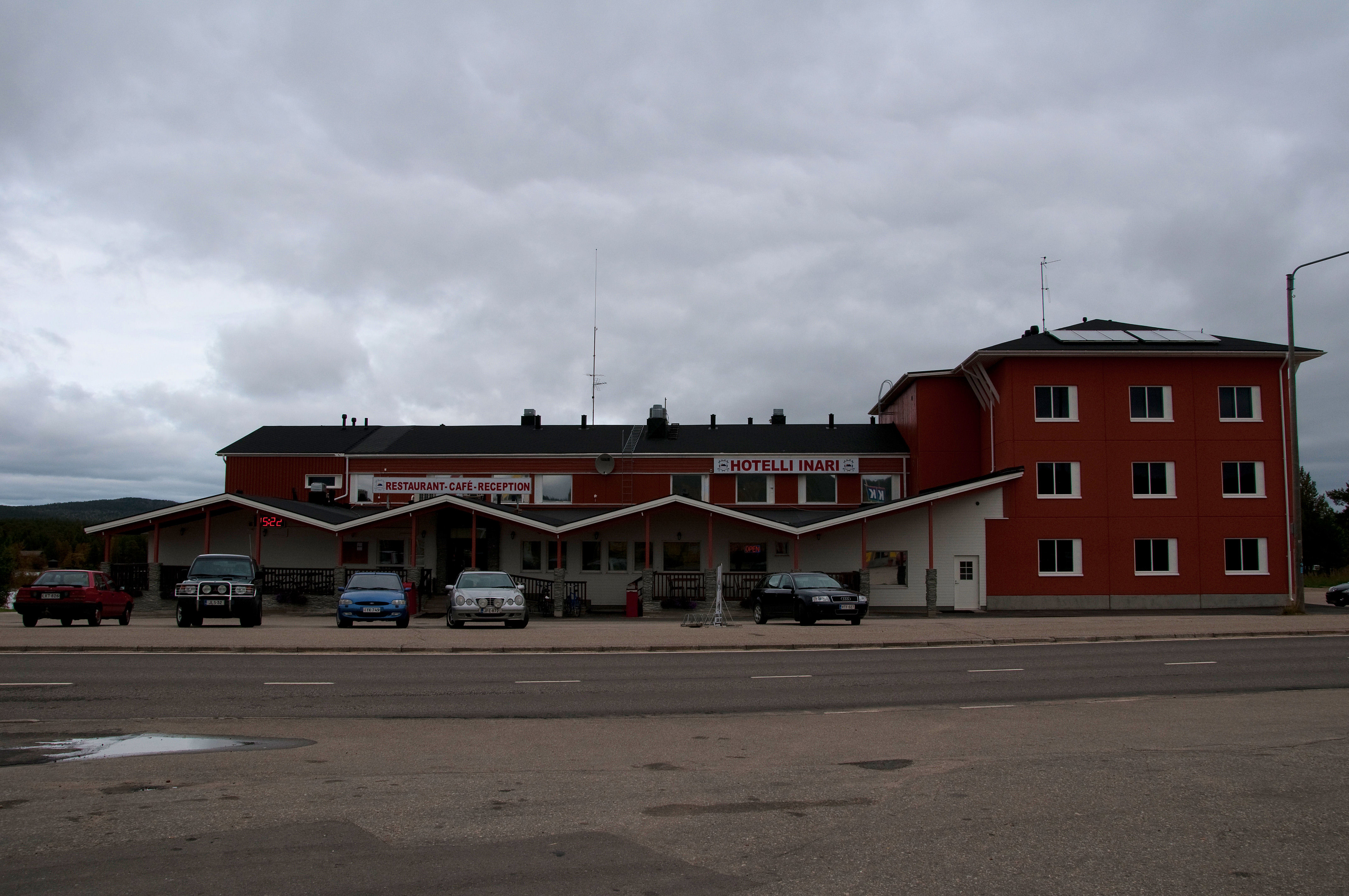
Hotel Inari

== See also ==
- Inari Sámi people
- Ivalo
