= Lake Sevettijärvi =

Lake in Inari, Finland

- Location within Lapland
- Coordinates: 69.564°N 28.710°E
- Type: Lake
- Primary inflows: Nilijoki river, lake Nilijärvi
- Primary outflows: lake Jänisjärvi
- Catchment area: Näätämöjoki
- Basin countries: Finland
- Surface area: 17.9 km^{2} (6.9 sq mi)
- Average depth: 8.72 m (28.6 ft)
- Max. depth: 43.49 m (142.7 ft)
- Water volume: 0.156 km^{3} (126,000 acre⋅ft)
- Shore length^{1}: 84.5 km (52.5 mi)
- Surface elevation: 95.6 m (314 ft)
- Settlements: Sevettijärvi
- ^{1} Shore length is not a well-defined measure.

Lake Sevettijärvi (Skolt Sami: Čeʹvetjäuʹrr, Inari Sami: Čevetjävri) a medium-sized lake in the Näätämöjoki main catchment area. It is located in the Lapland region of Finland. On the western shore there is the village Sevettijärvi. The inhabitants there are mainly Skolt Sami people.

== See also ==
- List of lakes in Finland
