= Sääʹmođđâz =

Sääʹmođđâz (The Skolt News) is to date the world's only quarterly that has been printed in the Skolt Sámi language. It ran from 1978 to 1986.

== History ==
Published four times a year, it was first printed in Finland in 1978 by editor-in-chief Satu Mosnikoff and several reporters and assistants. Sääʹmođđâz was distributed to every Skolt household and the members of the Skolt Supporters' Association as one way of disseminating the recently (1972) created orthography for the language. In addition, it was an important method of maintaining a sense of community in spite of the great distances between the three main Finnish Skolt communities of Sevettijärvi, Keväjärvi, and Nellim. The magazine had birth announcements, obituaries, wedding announcements, short stories written and illustrated by schoolchildren, news articles, official government and church announcements, and general interest stories. Each issue also had numerous photographs of the Skolt community. In spite of reaching the entire Skolt community residing in Finland, the last issue of Sääʹmođđâz was published in 1986 due to the difficulty of finding funding, a lack of reporters and the editor-in-chief being tired of publishing the magazine by herself.
