= Neiden =

Neiden may refer to:

- Neiden, Norway, a village in Sør-Varanger, Finnmark county, Norway
- Neiden Chapel, a chapel in the village of Neiden, Sør-Varanger, Finnmark county, Norway
- Neidenelva, the Norwegian name of the Näätämö River that flows through Norway and Finland
- Neiden, Germany, a village in the municipality Elsnig, Saxony, Germany
