= Pautujärvi =

Lake in Finland

- Location within Lapland
- Location: Inari
- Coordinates: 69°25′36″N 27°55′36″E
- Type: Lake
- Primary outflows: river Siuttajoki
- Catchment area: Paatsjoki
- Basin countries: Finland
- Surface area: 24.223 km^{2} (9.353 sq mi)
- Shore length^{1}: 48.38 km (30.06 mi)
- Surface elevation: 209.5 m (687 ft)
- ^{1} Shore length is not a well-defined measure.

Pautujärvi (Northern Sami: Bávdejávri, Inari Sami: Pavdjävri, Skolt Sami: Paudjäu'rr) is a medium-sized lake in the Paatsjoki main catchment area. It is located in Kaldoaivi Wilderness Area in the region Lapland in Finland. Quite near is a bit larger lake Iijärvi, although it belongs to a different main catchment area, catchment of Näätämö River.

== See also ==
- List of lakes in Finland
