= Vouvatusjärvi =

Lake in Norway and Russia

Vouvatusjärvi (Kven); Vaggatem (Norwegian); Vagatamjávri (Northern Sami); Vââggtemjäuʹrr (Skolt Sami); Ваггатем (Russian)
- Interactive map of the lake
- Location: Finnmark county, Norway and Murmansk Oblast, Russia
- Coordinates: 69.27159°N 29.26756°E
- Basin countries: Norway and Russia
- Surface area: 33.87 km^{2} (13.08 sq mi) with 28.99 km^{2} (11.19 sq mi) in Norway
- Shore length^{1}: 77.9 kilometres (48.4 mi)
- Surface elevation: 51 metres (167 ft)
- References: NVE
- ^{1} Shore length is not a well-defined measure.

Vouvatusjärvi (Kven), Vaggatem (Norwegian), Vagatamjávri (Northern Sami), Vââggtemjäuʹrr (Skolt Sami), or Ваггатем (Russian) is a lake on the border between Norway and Russia. The Norwegian part lies in Sør-Varanger Municipality in Finnmark county, while the Russian part lies in Murmansk Oblast.

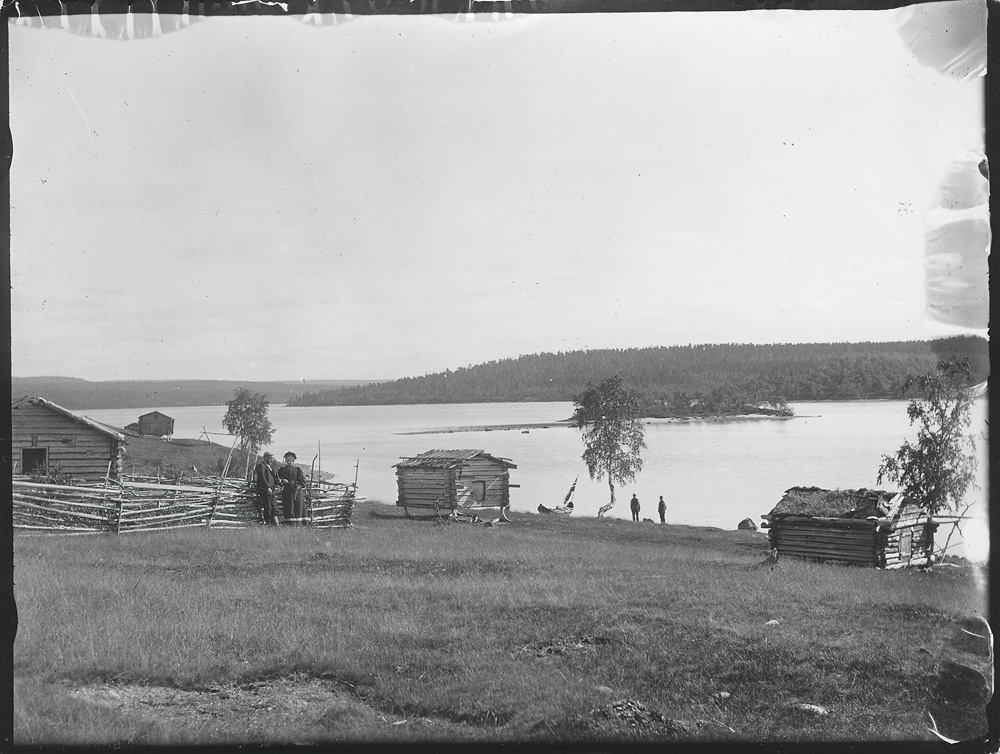
Wessel, Ellisif Rannveig Two men in front of a ski shed. Skolt settlement. Caption from book; Vaggatem, Skolt settlement on Nakholmen. July 1897. Johansen, Austerm and Røde, 2007

,

== See also ==
- List of lakes in Norway
