= Tiina Sanila-Aikio =

Sami musician and politician

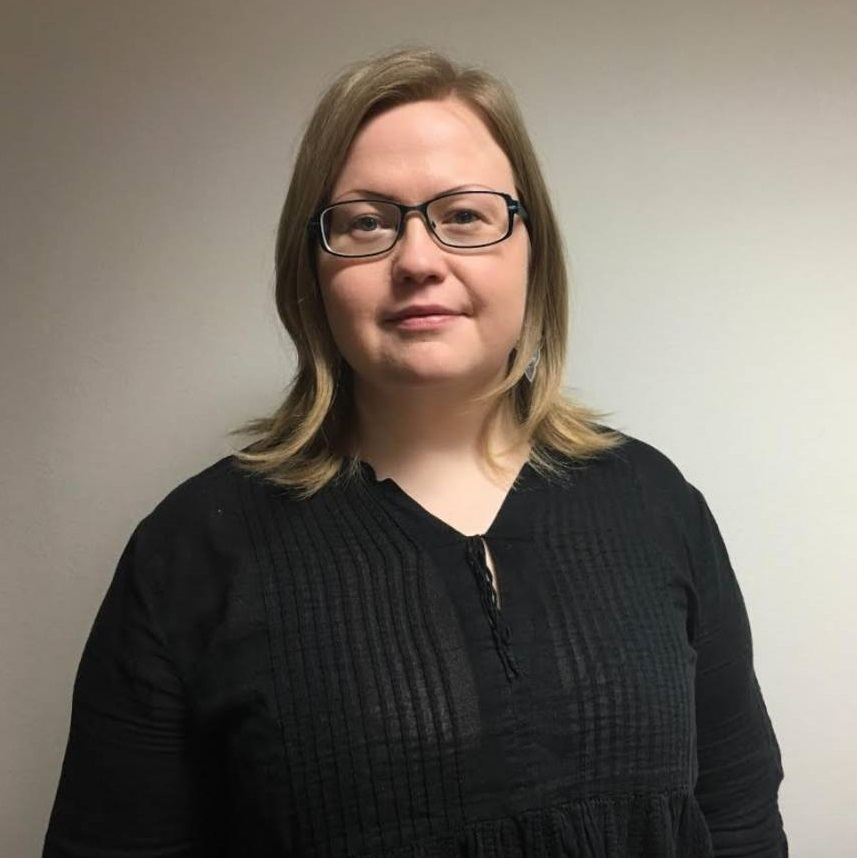
- Sanila-Aikio in 2017

3rd President of the Sami Parliament of Finland
- In office 28 March 2015 – 28 February 2020
- Preceded by: Klemetti Näkkäläjärvi
- Succeeded by: Tuomas Aslak Juuso

Personal details
- Born: Tiina Juulia Sanila; 25 March 1983 (age 43) Sevettijärvi, Finland
- Spouse: Leo Aikio
- Children: Elli-Dåʹmnn Aikio

Tiina Juulia Sanila-Aikio or Skolt Sami: Paavvâl Taannâl Tiina(born 25 March 1983 in Sevettijärvi, Inari, Finland) is a Skolt reindeer herder, musician, teacher, and a former vice-president and president of the Finnish Sámi Parliament.

== Early life ==
Tiina Juulia Sanila was born to Taannâl and Toini Sanila on 25 March 1983. Her father was a Skolt reindeer herder. Her mother is a Finn, originally from Ilomantsi, who moved to the area in the 1980s and who has worked as a teacher, the principal of Sevettijärvi school, and run the family's reindeer farm. Sanila attended the same school her mother worked at until high school, when she moved to Rovaniemi. Once she graduated from high school there, she started studying law at the University of Lapland.

== Musical career ==
Sanila published the world's first full-length rock CD ever in Skolt Saami in 2005 with her band of the same name. The name of the CD is called Sääʹmjânnam rocks! and it was produced by Tuupa Records Oy in Finland. On 7 June 2006 Tiina Sanila released a new single entitled “Uuh!”, which broke into the Finnish charts in 3rd place during the 26th week of 2006. This was the first time a Skolt Saami had ever broken into the charts. Sanila's next full-length CD Kåʹllkueʹll še måttmešt tålkk was released on 26 May 2007 at the Ijahis Idja festival in Inari.

== Awards ==
In December 2006, Tiina Sanila received the Cultural Award from the Province of Lapland in Finland for her work.

== Personal life ==
In August 2008, Sanila wed Leo Aikio, an Inari Saami reindeer herder. Their daughter Elli-Dåʹmnn was born in 2009.

== Discography ==
=== LPs ===
- 2005 – Sääʹmjânnam rocks!
- 2007 – Kåʹllkueʹll še måttmešt tålkk

=== Singles ===
- 2006 – ”Uuh!”
