= Iijärvi (Inari) =

Lake in the country of Finland

Lake Iijärvi
- Location within Lapland
- Coordinates: 69°28′N 27°53′E
- Lake type: Natural
- Primary inflows: Vaijoki
- Primary outflows: Näätämö River / Neidenelva
- Catchment area: Näätämö River
- Basin countries: Finland
- Surface area: 36.881 km^{2} (14.240 sq mi)
- Average depth: 8.2 m (27 ft)
- Max. depth: 36.47 m (119.7 ft)
- Water volume: 0.303 km^{3} (0.073 cu mi)
- Shore length^{1}: 103.09 km (64.06 mi)
- Surface elevation: 193.3 m (634 ft)
- ^{1} Shore length is not a well-defined measure.

Iijärvi (Northern Sami: Idjajávri, Inari Sami: Ijjävri, Skolt Sami: Iijäuʹrr) is a medium-sized lake in Inari, Finland. It is located in Kaldoaivi Wilderness Area. Näätämö River (Finnish: Näätämöjoki, Norwegian: Neidenelva) flows from it to Neiden Fjord in Norway. Quite near is a similar lake Pautujärvi, although it belongs to a different main catchment area, catchment of Paatsjoki.

== See also ==
- List of lakes in Finland
