= Yle Ođđasat =

Finnish television program

Yle Ođđasat ('Yle News') is Sámi-language news service in Finland that focuses on the Sámi people and their interests. It publishes news in all three Sámi languages recognised in Finland: Northern Sámi, Inari Sámi and Skolt Sámi.

A news broadcast is published on weekdays on TV, radio and the internet. The broadcasting started in 2013 and an episode is five minutes long. The broadcasting is headquartered in the town of Inari. The program has around 200 000 viewers every week.
