= Keväjärvi =

Village in Inari, Finland

Coordinates: 68°42′30″N 027°46′40″E

Keväjärvi (Inari Sami: Kiäváájävri, Skolt Sami: Keväjäuʹrr) is a village in the municipality of Inari, Finland, 13 kilometres (8 mi) northeast of Ivalo and south of Lake Inari along the regional road 969 leading to Nellim, which used to lead all the way to Pechenga, when it was part of Finland. The village is located on a pine-covered ridge surrounded by lakes that flow into Nanguvuono. At the end of 2005, 185 people lived in Keväjärvi.
