= Sevettijärvi =

Village in Inari, Finland

Sevettijärvi (Finnish) Čeʹvetjäuʹrr (Skolt Sami)
- Location in Finland
- Coordinates: 69°30′20″N 28°35′28″E
- Country: Finland
- Region: Lapland
- Municipality: Inari

Population
  - Total: 350

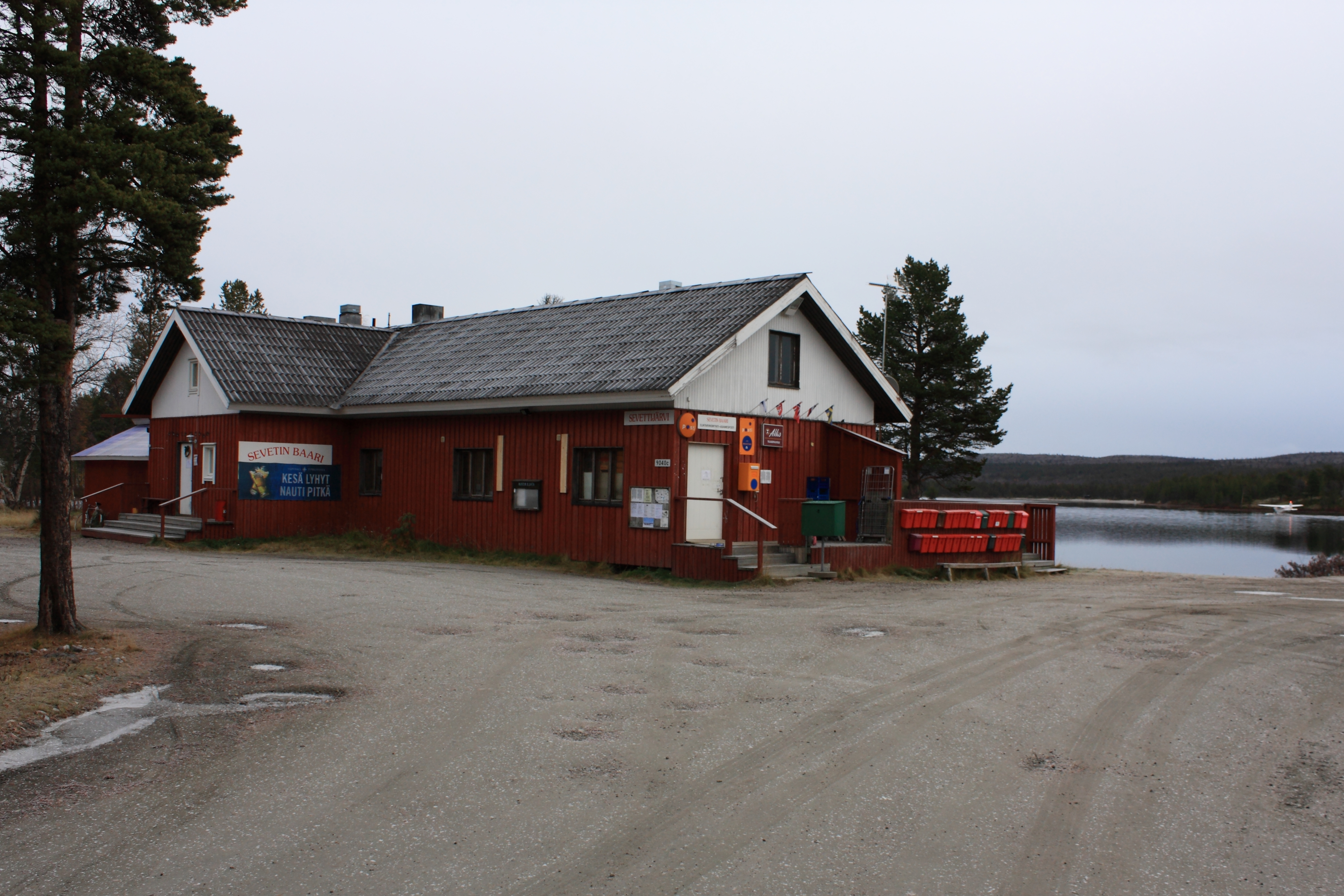
Sevetin Baari restaurant, which acts also as a post office and a bus terminal. A hydroplane is taking off in the background of this image.

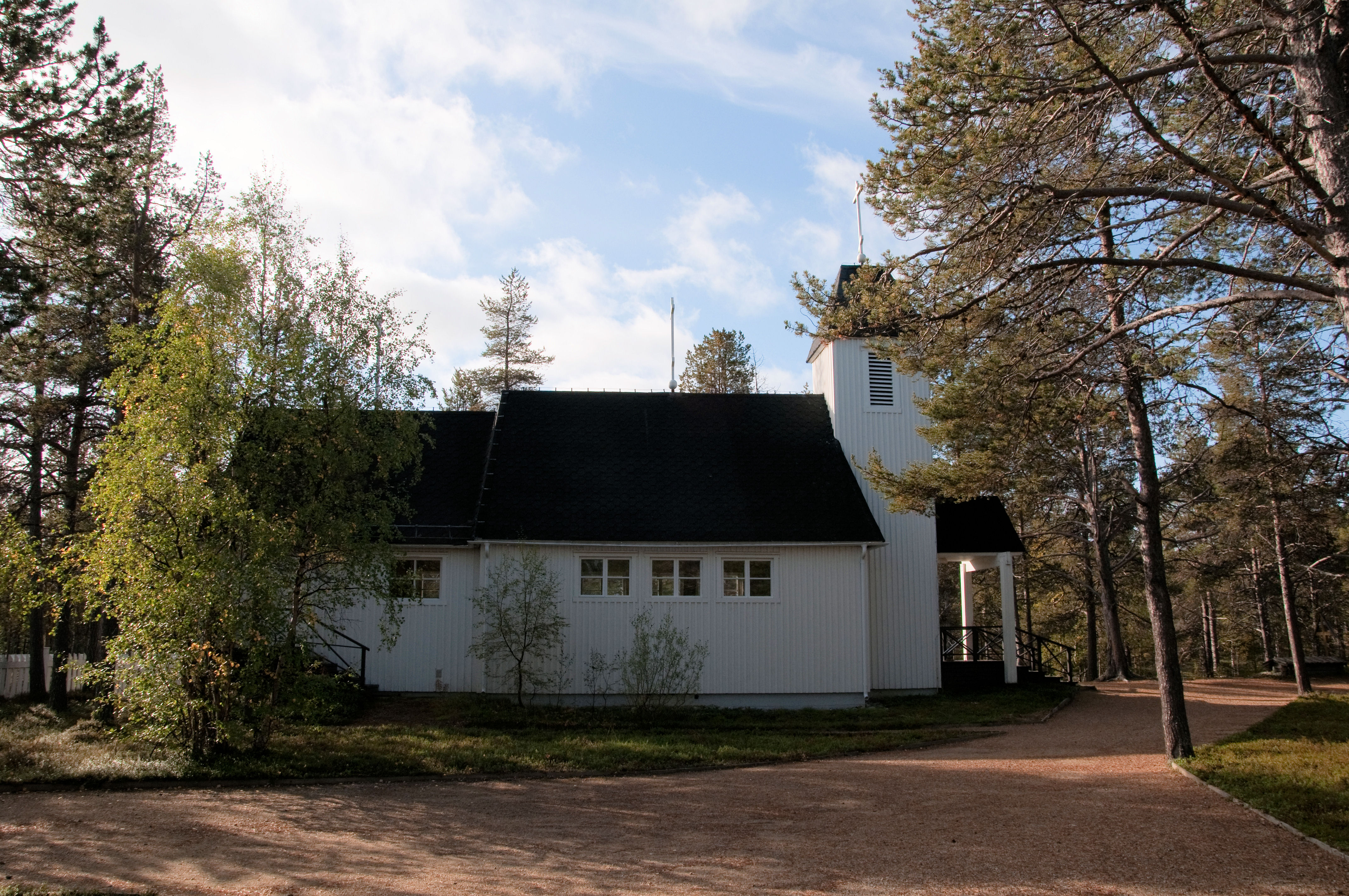
The Church of St. Tryphon of Pechenga in Sevettijärvi

Sevettijärvi (Skolt Sami: Čeʹvetjäuʹrr; Inari Sami: Čevetjävri; Northern Sami: Čeavetjávri) is a village in the municipality of Inari, Finland approximately 120 kilometres (75 mi) north of downtown Inari. Neiden in Norway is approximately 35 kilometres (22 mi) away. The village's green, yet stark terrain opens up as Neiden approaches.

The village is built on what used to be the sea floor during the Ice Age. The rocky shores of the lakes between Sevettijärvi and Neiden draw the attention of passers-by. These shores are referred to as the “devil’s fields” by locals.

Sevettijärvi and its surrounding areas are one of the main areas where the Skolts live. The majority of Sevettijärvi's 350 residents, approximately 90%, are Skolt, although there are a few Finns who have moved north living in the village. A few Inari and Northern Sámi and some foreigners (French, Dutch) also live in the area.

== History ==
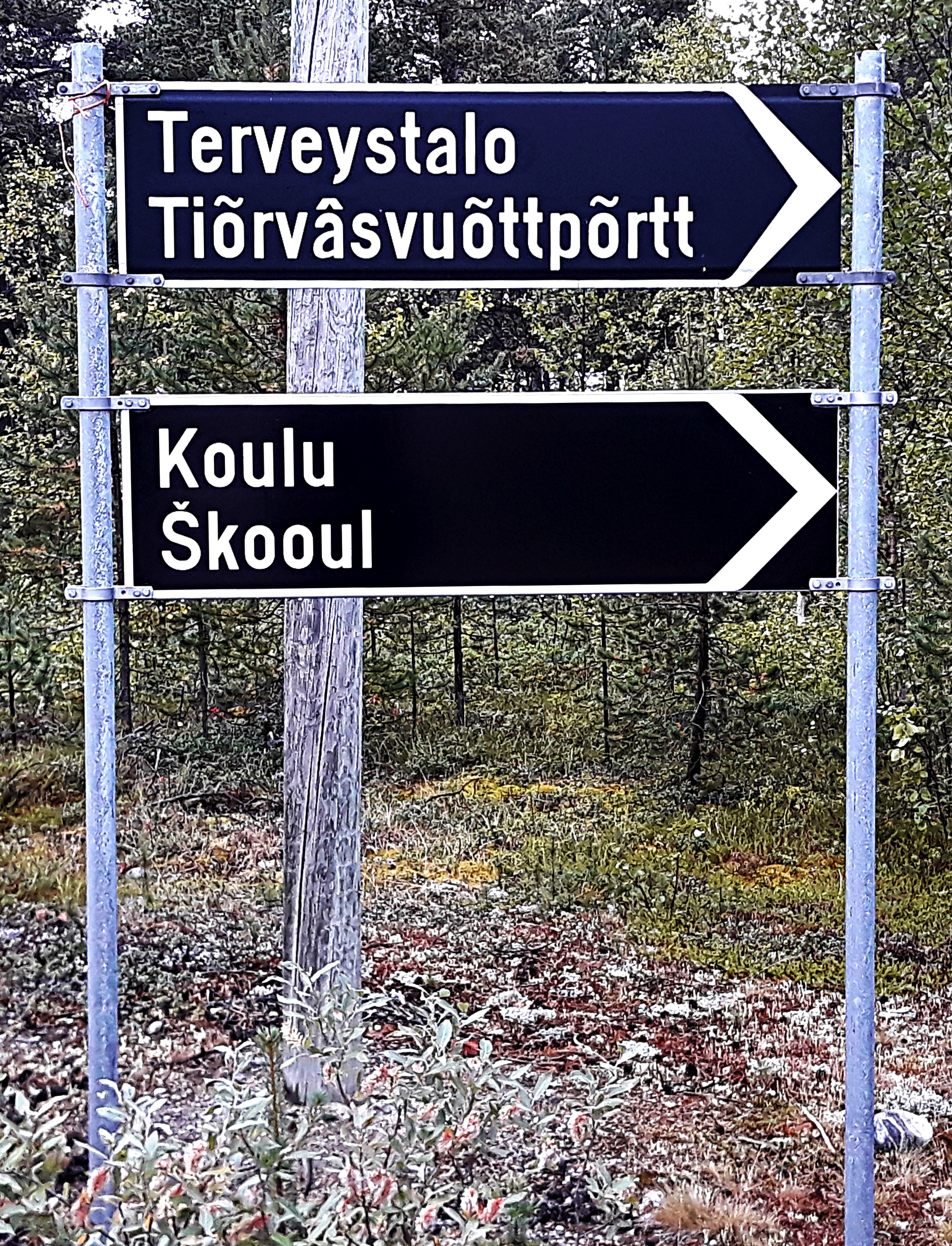
Bilingual road sign in Finnish (above) and Skolt Saami (below) for the school and the health center

Sevettijärvi was founded when a total of 51 Skolt families were evacuated there from Petsamo after the wars in 1949. Before that, a few Sámi families had been living in the area, e.g., the Aikios, Kittis, Sarris, Holmbergs, Högmans and Kaarrettis.

At the same time, a school, a health centre and a chapel were built. A merchant from Inari built a shop in the center of the village.

The first road passable by car to Sevettijärvi was built at the end of the 1960s. Prior to that, people used Bombardier snowmobiles, reindeer and skis to get around in winter and walked, biked or went by boat in the summertime.

== Sites ==
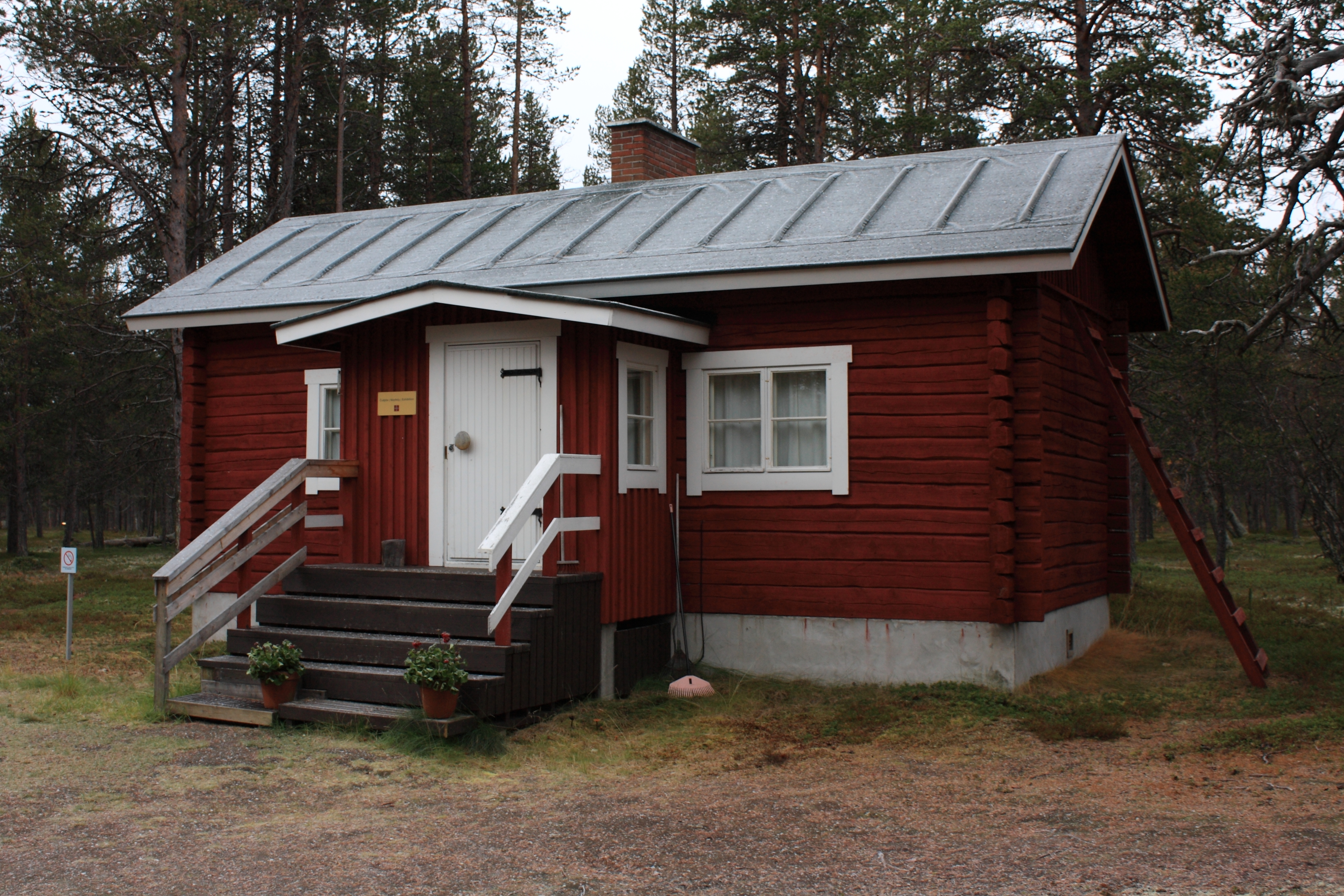
The Skolt Sámi Heritage House, which is an old Skolt cottage moved from Kirakkajärvi to Sevettijärvi that is now used as a museum.

The village has an old Skolt cottage, which was moved to Sevettijärvi from Kirakkajärvi and currently serves as a museum dedicated to the traditions of the Skolts. In addition, it has an Orthodox church that previously served as the parish's chapel.

The fjeld Jänispää rises out of the ground approximately 10 kilometres (6 mi) north of Sevettijärvi. A suspension bridge hangs over the Näätämö River at Lake Opukas, an approximately 15 kilometres (9 mi) hike from Sevettijärvi.

== Notable people ==
- Veikko Feodoroff, member of the Sami Parliament (Finland)
- Tiina Sanila-Aikio (born 1983), Skolt musician and politician

== See also ==
- Sevetti moraine
