= Neiden, Norway =

Village in Sør-Varanger, Norway

Neiden (Norwegian) Njávdán (Northern Sami) Njiävđám (Inari Sami) Njauddâm (Skolt Sami) Näätämö (Finnish)
- Village
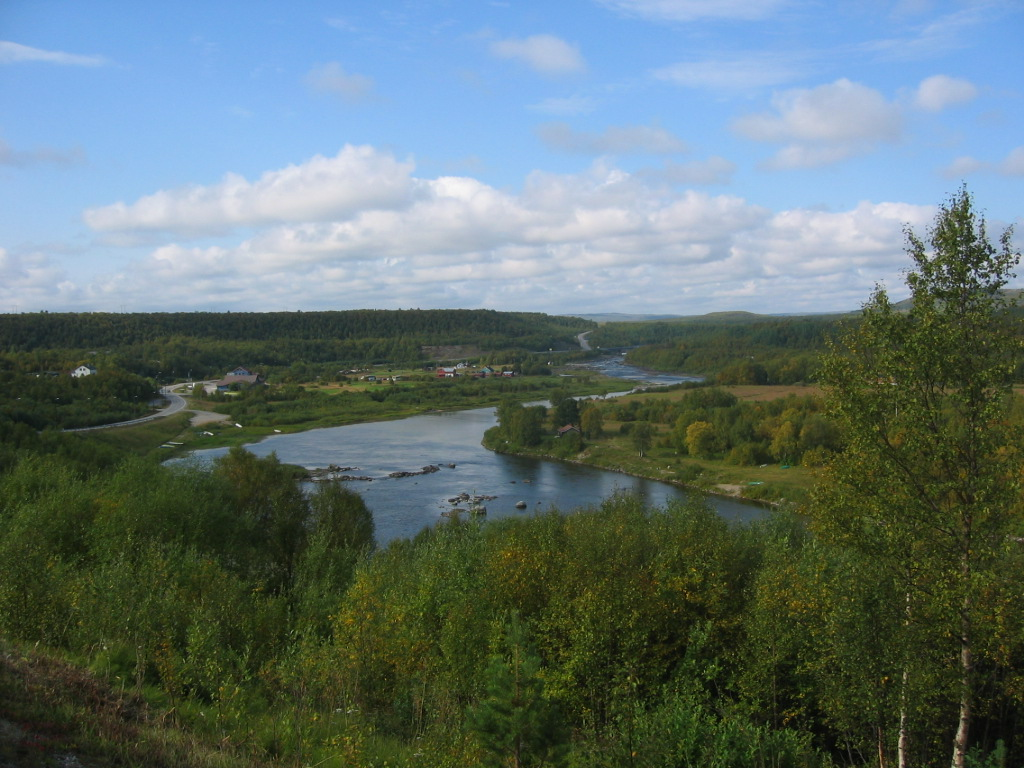
- The left side of the river shows Skoltebyen and other parts of "inner Neiden", and the road towards Kirkenes. The road splits at the eastern bridgehead; one road goes to Finland (center of picture), and the other road crosses the bridge, and goes (behind a treeline) on up to "lower Neiden", and towards Nesseby Municipality.
- Interactive map of Neiden (Norwegian)
- Location within Norway Location within Finland
- Coordinates: 69°41′45″N 29°22′39″E
- Country: Norway
- Region: Northern Norway
- County: Finnmark
- District: Øst-Finnmark
- Municipality: Sør-Varanger Municipality
- Elevation: 41 m (135 ft)
- Time zone: UTC+01:00 (CET)
  - Summer (DST): UTC+02:00 (CEST)
- Post Code: 9930 Neiden

Neiden (also: Njávdem (Skolt Sami)) is a hamlet (or grend) in Sør-Varanger, Norway.

Skoltebyen (Sää'msijdd; Kolttakylä) and ['inner Neiden' or] Indre Neiden is on the east-side of the river Neidenelva, according to the Norwegian Mapping Authority; Neiden and ['lower Neiden' or] Nedre Neiden is marked on the west-side.

The European route E6 highway runs through Neiden. There is a bus stop at [a roadhouse,] Neidenkroa; there is another bus stop on the other side of the river - Neiden Hotell, near a former hotel at Skoltebyen.

Neiden (also: Njauddâm (Skolt Sami), Njávdán (Northern Sami), Njiävđám (Inari Sami), and Näätämö (Finnish) or Näätämö (Norja), previously also Näytämö).

Neighboring settlements: There is a settlement on the Finnish side, Näätämö (Finland) (map), one kilometer from the Finland-Norway border. It has shops.

Culture: Traditional row boats made of wood, called "Neiden boat"s (Neidenbåt), were not made for many years until one was finished in 2024. Those boats were used for fishing on the Neiden River.

== History ==
Neiden became the main settlement of the westernmost Njauddâm sijdd (Northern Sami: siida, i.e. the fundamental unit of the old Sami society, indicating both the area and the family group(s) exploiting it) of the Skolts and has remained relatively unchanged, leaving numerous traces of earlier use of the area intact.

Neiden was governmentally divided officially in 1852. The reason for that separation was the demarcation treaty between the Kingdom of Sweden-Norway and the Grand Duchy of Finland, which prohibited nomadic reindeer herding and moving of fishermen over the border. That caused much harm to reindeer husbandry for a long time.

=== World War Two ===
In October, 1944, German forces withdrew through the area after having failed to capture Murmansk in Operation Silver Fox. On the 26th and 27th around two hundred Soviet and German soldiers were killed around the village.

== People ==
Most inhabitants of Neiden are Sami, Kven, and Norwegians.

=== Skolt Sami ===
The Skolts form a minority group among the Sami and are distinct from other groups in a number of ways. The Russian culture has had a strong influence on the Skolts, who adopted Christianity in its Eastern Orthodox form in the 16th century. The Skolt Sami language is highly endangered. Almost all speakers live in Finland. The Ä'vv Skolt Sami Museum, situated in Neiden, officially opened in June 2016. A Skolt Sami tradition maintained until today is the so-called Käpälä-fishing of salmon with a cast net.

== Protected area (in Skoltebyen) ==
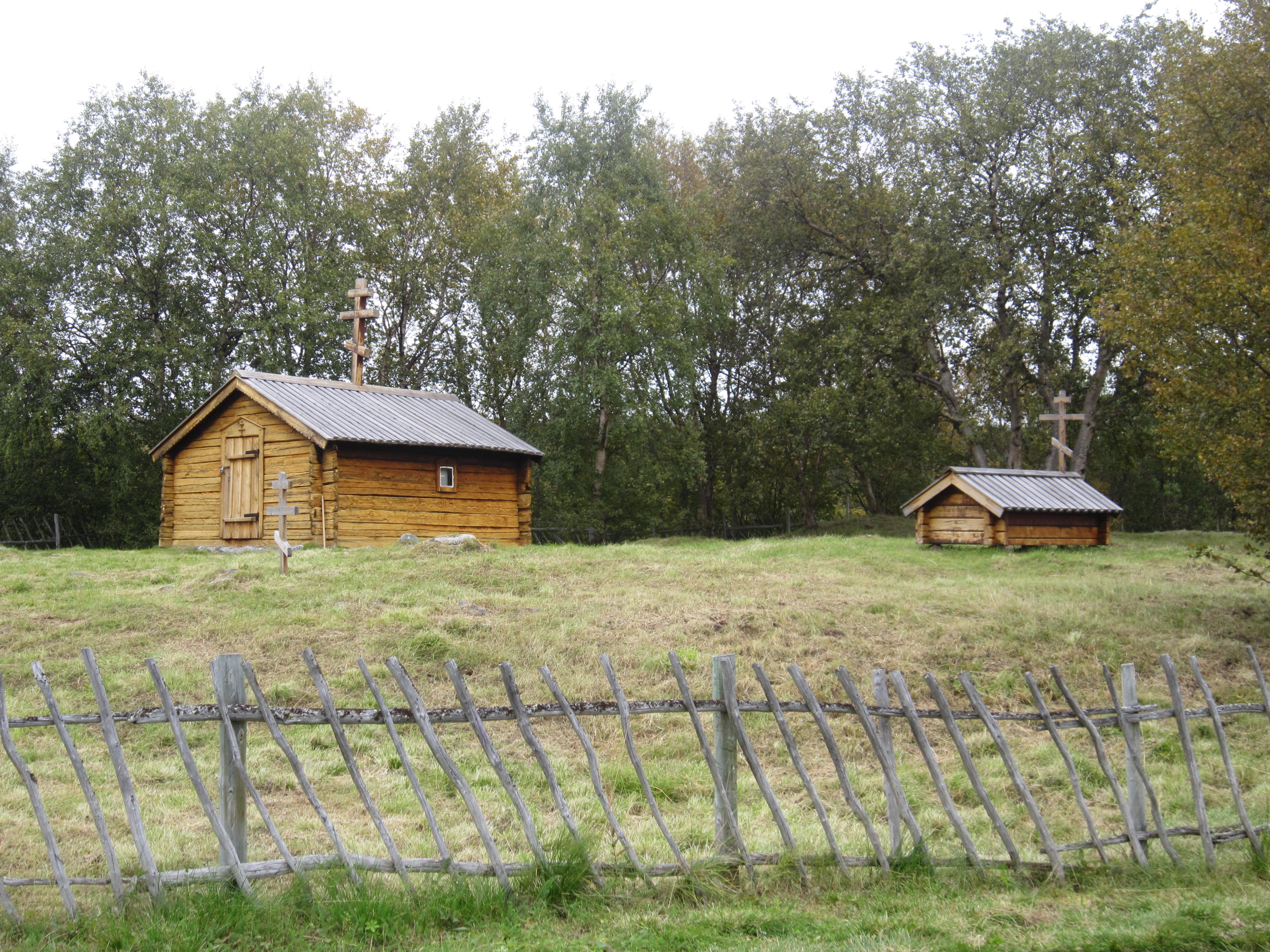
The Skolt Sámi Orthodox Chapel in Neiden

The protected area in Skoltebyen includes a number of different monuments, some of which are old enough (i.e. more than 100 years) to be automatically protected under the Cultural Heritage Act. These include a Russian Orthodox graveyard, the ruins of a smoke sauna, sixteen sites of traditional turf huts known as gammer and a tiny (13 square metres or 140 square feet) Russian Orthodox chapel, St. Georg's Chapel, built 1565 by Tryphon of Pechenga. In addition, many of the natural features of the area have been and are being used in religious ceremonies, such as baptism.

The formal protection (scheduling) of the settlement was carried out in order to safeguard its historical and religious importance as well as the integrity of the landscape. This is the most important cultural heritage site for the Skolts and their surviving culture in Norway. The protection order was issued to prevent the area from being developed in a way that would reduce its significance and cultural value, while at the same time encouraging use that will communicate, maintain and develop the Skolt culture. The protection order does not affect the commercial salmon fishing in the Neiden River nor other commercial activities in the area.

== Religion ==
The oldest church in Neiden (and in Finnmark) is St. Georg's Russian Orthodox chapel (built 1565), mentioned above. There is also the Lutheran Neiden Chapel, built in 1902 in the classical style of a Norwegian stave church. It was built as part of a deliberate policy of Norwegianization of Eastern Finnmark in the face of fear of Russian encroachment.

== Other information ==
The village area is in the Sápmi area along the Finland–Norway border with about 250 inhabitants. Neiden, situated along the Neiden River, actually consists of two villages 12 kilometers apart, separated by the border of Norway and Finland. One village is in Sør-Varanger Municipality in Finnmark county, Norway, and the other village is in Inari Municipality in Lapland, Finland. Neiden is the official name in Norway and Näätämö in Finland.

The name of the settlement, has been used for at least one commercial product: a bed frame with the same name of the settlement has been sold on IKEA .

== See also ==
- Nazi concentration camps in Norway
