= Skolts =

Sámi ethnic group

Säʹmmla Nuõrttsääʹm
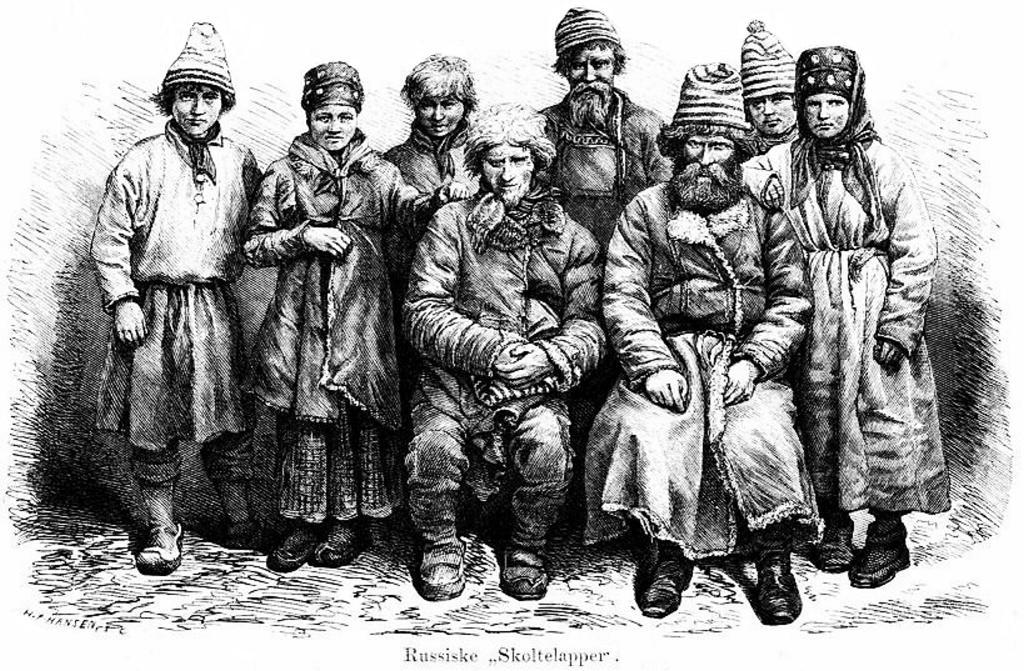
- Drawing of Russian Skolt Sami from 1871

Total population
- c. 1,250

Regions with significant populations
- Finland: 500–700
- Russia: Murmansk Oblast: 250–400
- Norway: 150

Languages
- Skolt Sámi, Finnish, Russian and Norwegian

Religion
- Eastern Orthodox majority Lutheran minority

Related ethnic groups
- Other Sámi

The Skolt Sámi or Skolts are a Sámi ethnic group. They currently live in and around the villages of Sevettijärvi, Keväjärvi, Nellim in the municipality of Inari, at several places in the Murmansk Oblast and in the village of Neiden in Sør-Varanger Municipality. The Skolts are considered to be the indigenous people of the borderland area between present-day Finland, Russia and Norway, i.e. on the Kola Peninsula and the adjacent Fenno-Scandinavian mainland. They belong to the eastern group of Sámi on account of their language and traditions, and are traditionally Orthodox rather than Lutheran Christians like most Sámi and Finns.

In 2024, Venke Törmänen, the leader of an NGO called Norrõs Skoltesamene, appeared in Ságat, a Sámi newspaper, saying "Eastern Sámi" should not be used to refer to the Skolt Sámi.

== History ==
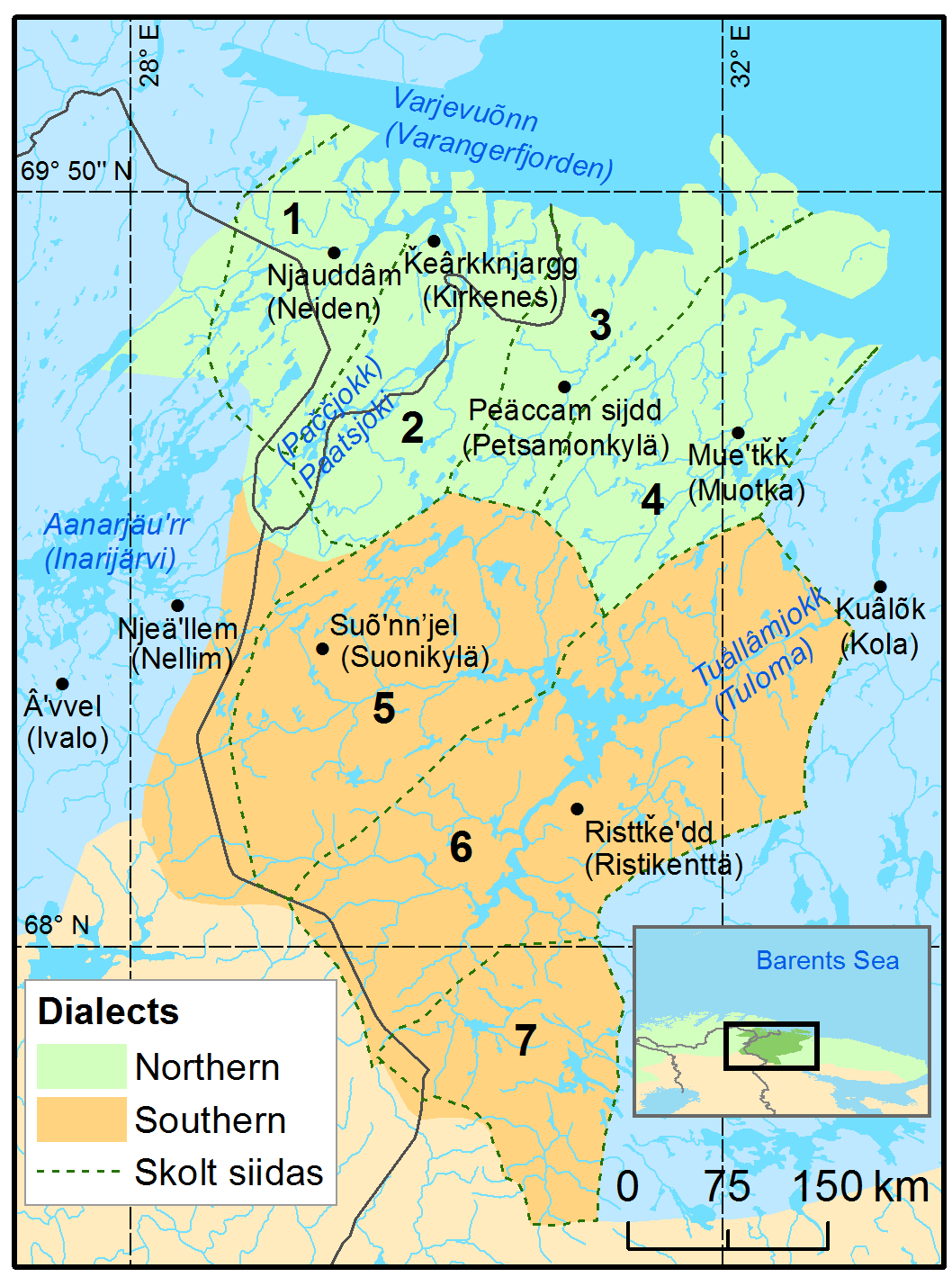
Traditional territories of Skolt Sami

As a result of the Treaty of Tartu (1920), the Skolt homeland was split in two: the western part, Petsamo, became part of Finland and the eastern part became part of the Soviet Union. The border became a threat to the identity of the Skolts as it grew difficult for them to live as they traditionally had with reindeer husbandry, hunting and fishing as the source of their livelihood. Many Finnish immigrants moved back to their traditional Skolt homeland. In 1926, one-quarter of Petsamo's population were Skolts, and in 1930 the proportion dropped to one-sixth.

After the Winter War (1939), Finland lost its portion of the Rybachiy Peninsula to the Soviet Union and after the Continuation War (1941–1944), it lost Petsamo, too. As a result, the Skolts living in Suonikylä and Paatsjoki were evacuated to Finland, with the Suonikylä Skolts settling in Sevettijärvi, the Paatsjoki Skolts in Keväjärvi and along the Rautujoki River of Sevettijärvi, and the Petsamo Skolts in the villages of Mustola, and Sarmijärvi in Nellim.

== Demographics ==
Current estimates put the number of ethnic Skolt Sámi at around 1250, of whom approximately 400 can speak Skolt Sámi. Most of them live in Finland today.

In Finland, Russia and Norway they number about 700, 400 and possibly more than 150.

== Religion ==
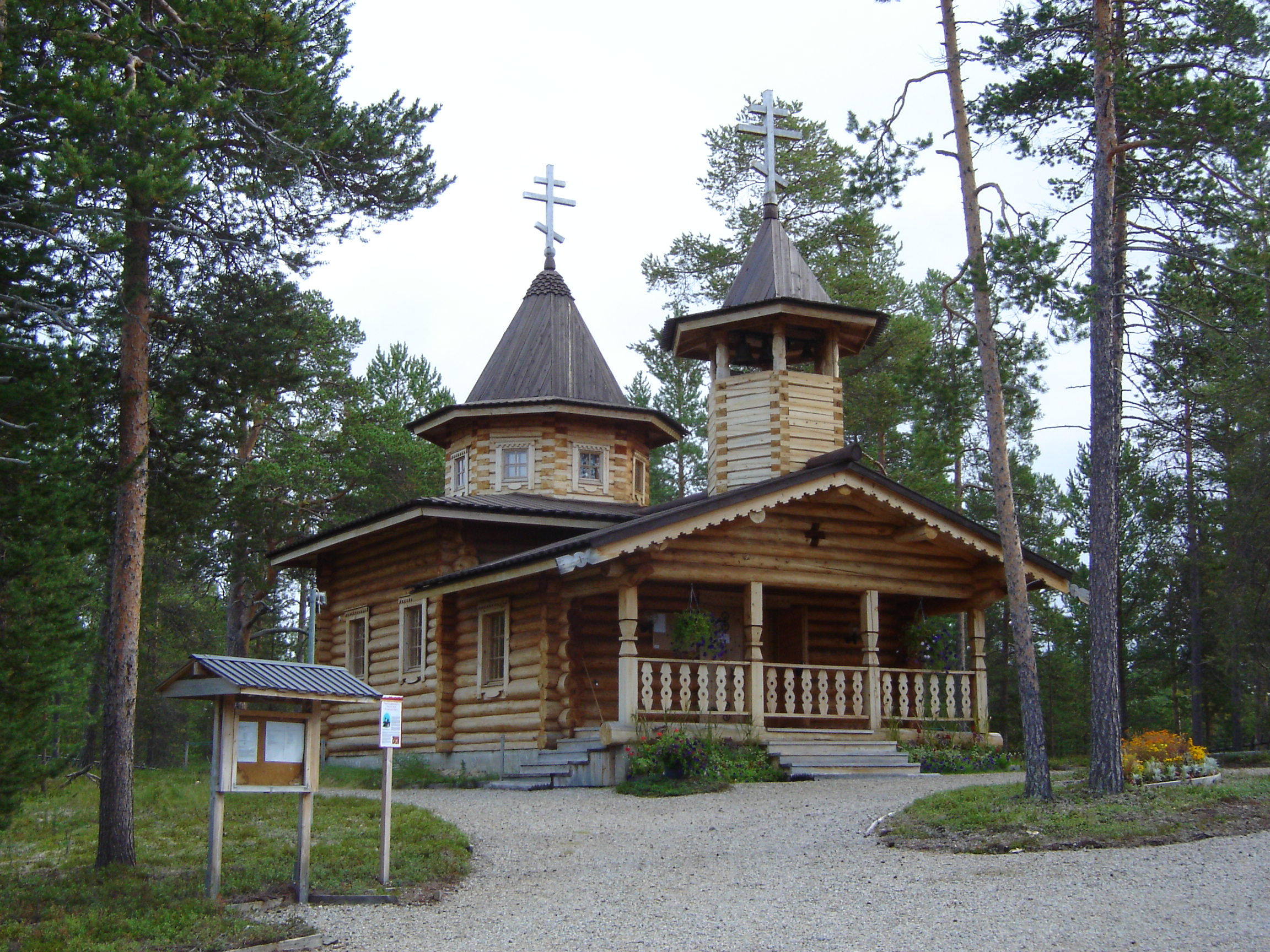
The wooden Skolt Sámi Orthodox Church in Nellim

Saint Tryphon of Pechenga converted the Skolts to Christianity in the 16th century and even today, the majority of Skolts are members of the Eastern Orthodox Church.

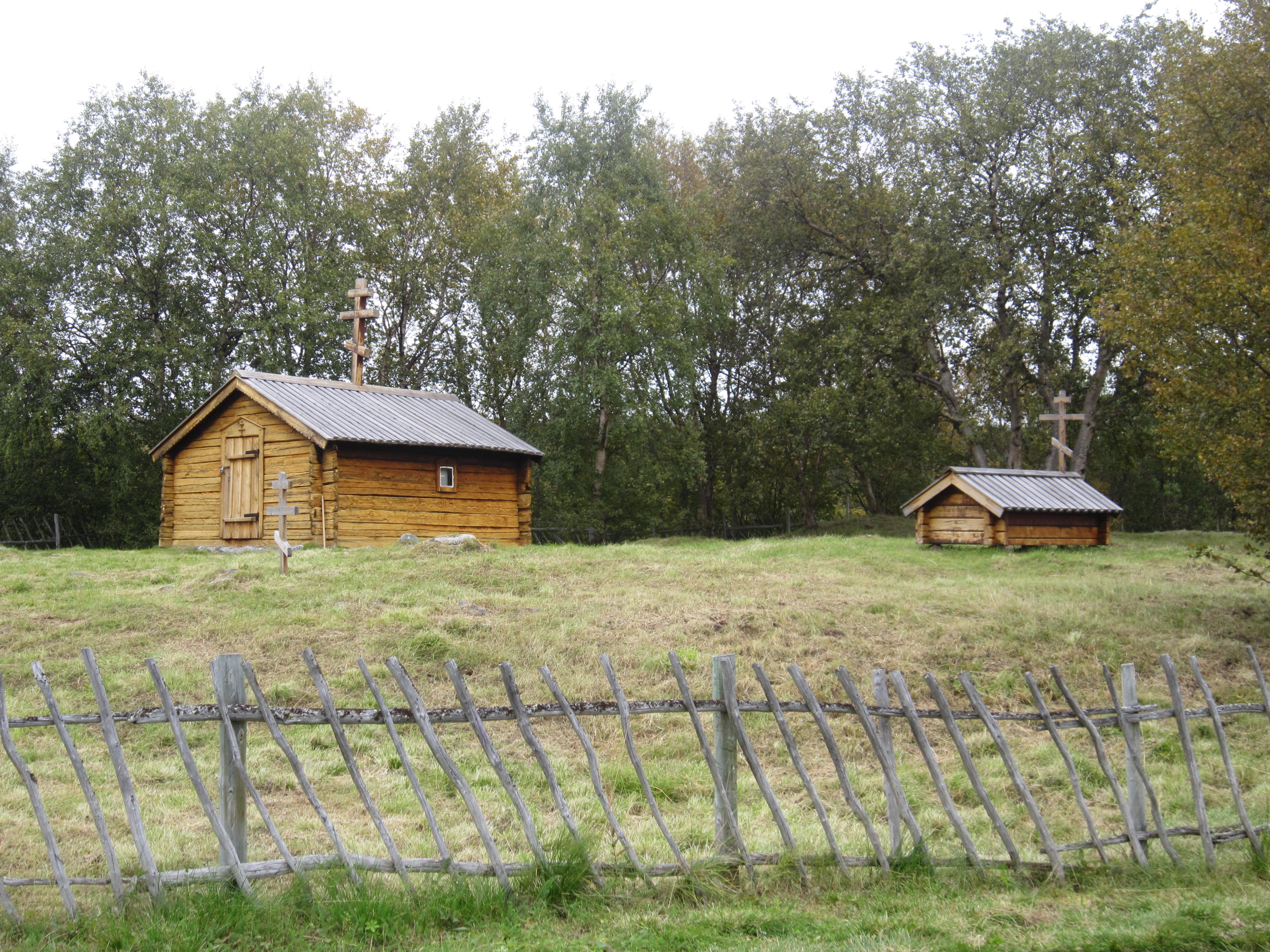
The Skolt Sámi Orthodox Chapel in Neiden

== See also ==
- Jeʹvida
- Tim Ingold
