= Nellim =

Nellim (Finnish) Njellim (Inari Sami) Njeäʹllem (Skolt Sami)
- Village
- Interactive map of Nellim (Finnish); Njellim (Inari Sami); Njeäʹllem (Skolt Sami)
- Location in Finland
- Coordinates: 68°50′46″N 28°18′58″E
- Country: Finland
- Region: Lapland
- Municipality: Inari

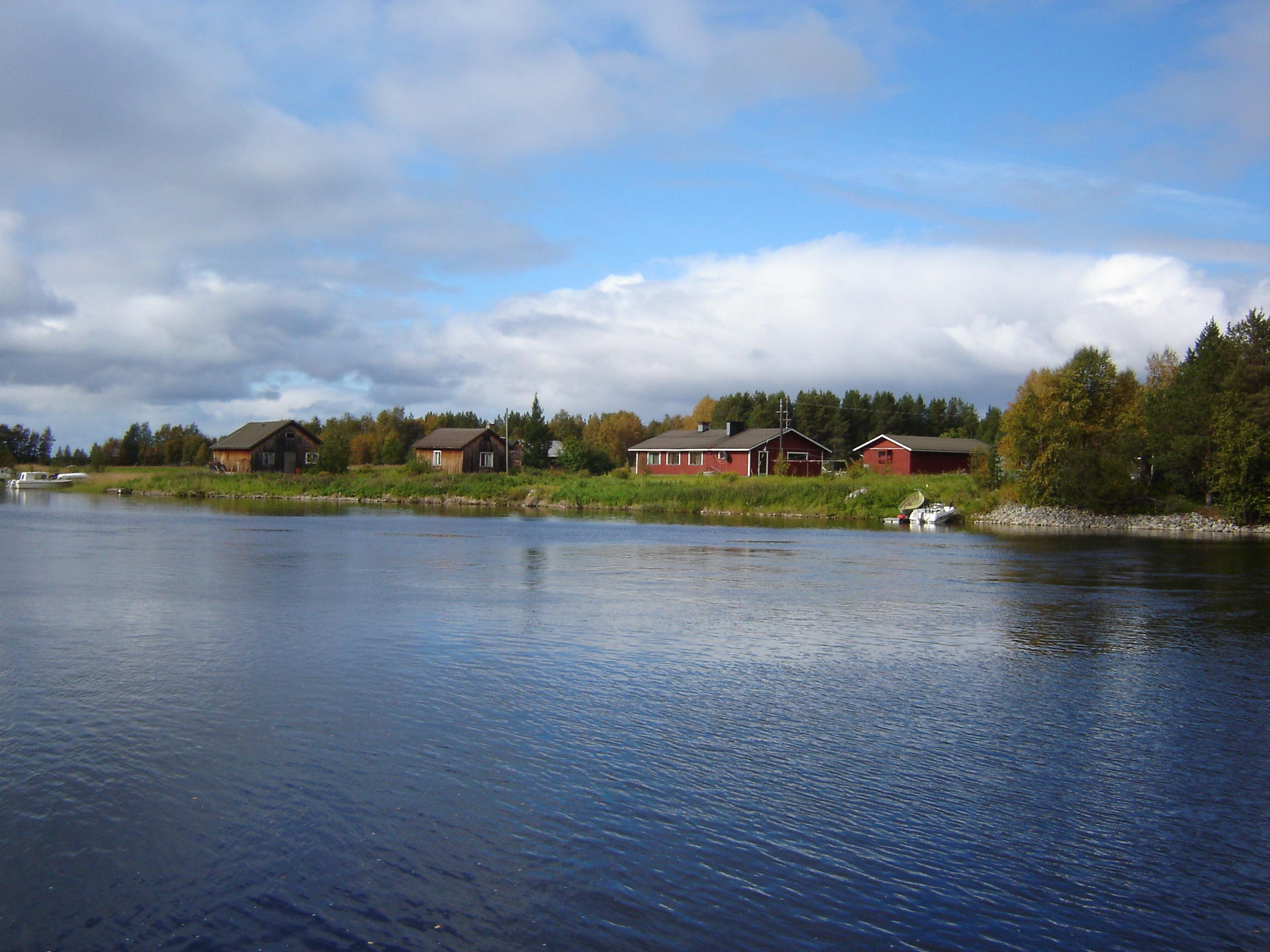
Nellim village center

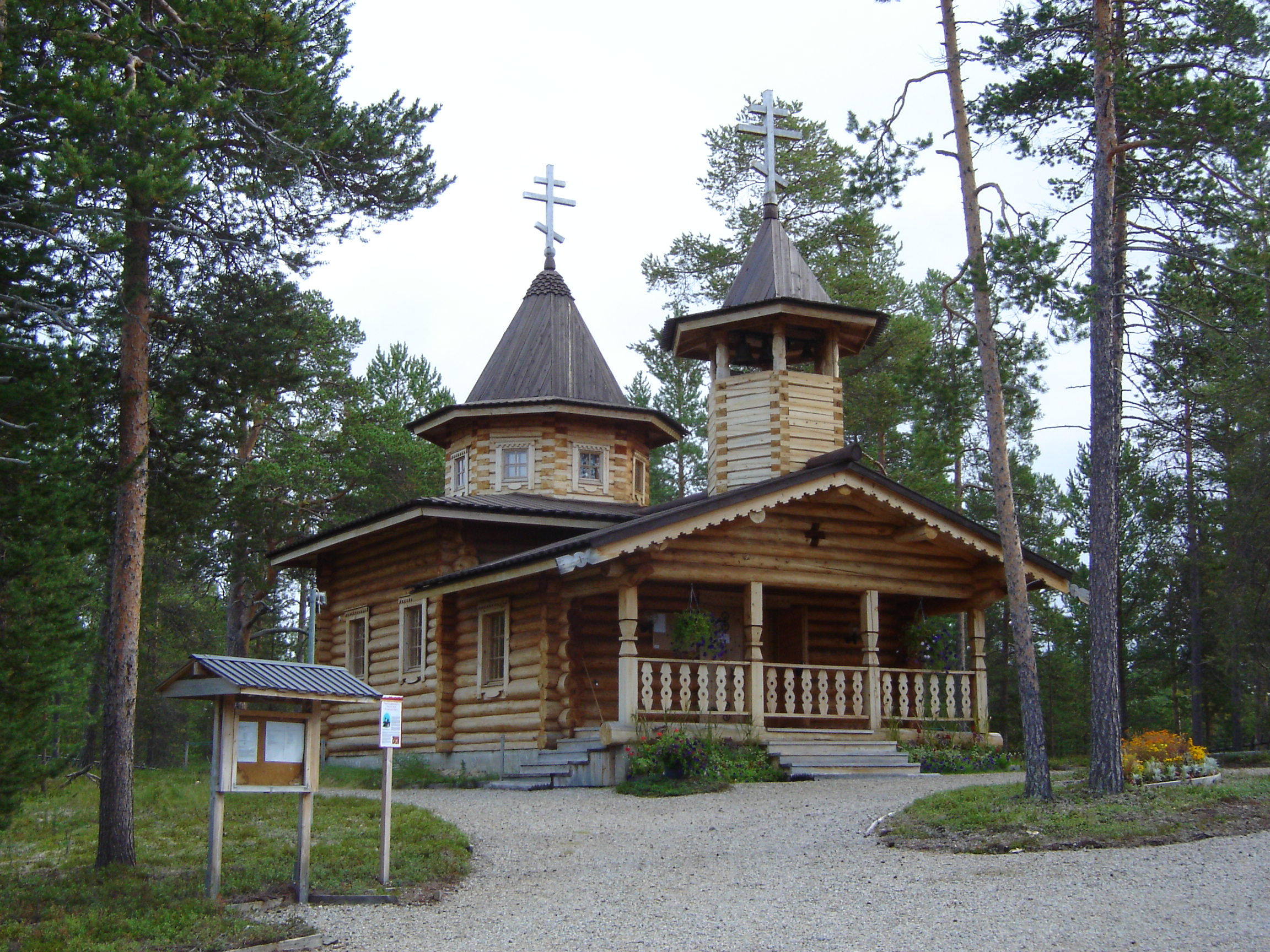
The wooden Skolt Sámi Orthodox Church in Nellim

Nellim (Finnish: Nellim or Nellimö; Inari Sami: Njellim; Skolt Sami: Njeäʹllem) is a village on the shore of Lake Inari in Inari, Finland that has three distinctly different cultures: Finns, the Inari Sámi and the Skolt Sámi. Nellim is approximately 42 kilometres (26 mi) northeast of Ivalo and approximately 9 kilometres (6 mi) away from the Russian border. The village has a hotel with a bar (open for winter season), a cafeteria (open in the summer), a marina, an Orthodox wilderness church and a Wilderness hotel. Other landmarks in the area include an old log flume, the Travellers' Cross at Tsarmijärvi, and remnants of the Rautaportti "Iron Gate" fortifications that were constructed in the second world war. The people of Nellim claim that it is the best location in Finland to view the Northern Lights.

== Livelihood ==
The main sources of livelihood in Nellim are reindeer husbandry, natural economy and tourism.
