= Näätämö (river) =

River in Finland and Norway

Näätämöjoki (Finnish); Neidenelva (Norwegian); Njávdámjohka (Northern Sami)
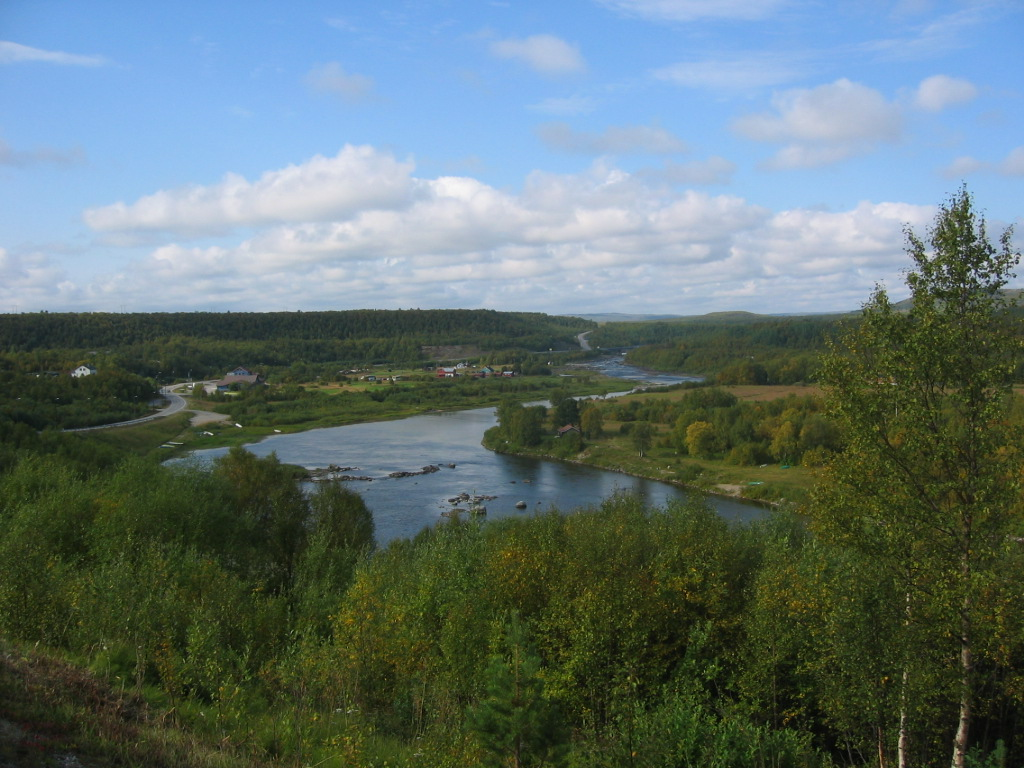
- View of the village of Neiden
- Interactive map of the river

Location
- Country: Norway, Finland

Physical characteristics
- Source
  - location: Lake Iijärvi, Inari, Finland
  - elevation: 193 m (633 ft)
- Mouth
  - location: Neidenfjorden (Arctic Sea), Sør-Varanger, Norway
  - coordinates: 69°42′06″N 029°32′28″E
  - elevation: 0 m (0 ft)
- Length: 100 km (62 mi)

The Näätämöjoki (Finnish), Neidenelva (Norwegian), or Njávdámjohka (Northern Sami) is a river in Finland's Lapland, north of Lake Inari. It flows from Lake Iijärvi in Inari Municipality through Norway's Sør-Varanger Municipality and empties into the Neidenfjorden, an arm off the main Varangerfjorden.

The portion of the river within Finland, the Näätämöjoki, is approximately 50-kilometre (31 mi) long and drops down approximately 130 metres (430 ft) from the elevation of Lake Iijärvi (193 metres or 633 feet above sea level). At several points, the river widens into lakes, of which the largest are Lakes Kaarttilompolo, Vuodasluobal, and Opukas.

Based on annual catch, the Neidenelva is Norway's third most productive river for salmon fishing. Atlantic salmon, lake trout, sea trout, graylings and pike are all indigenous species.

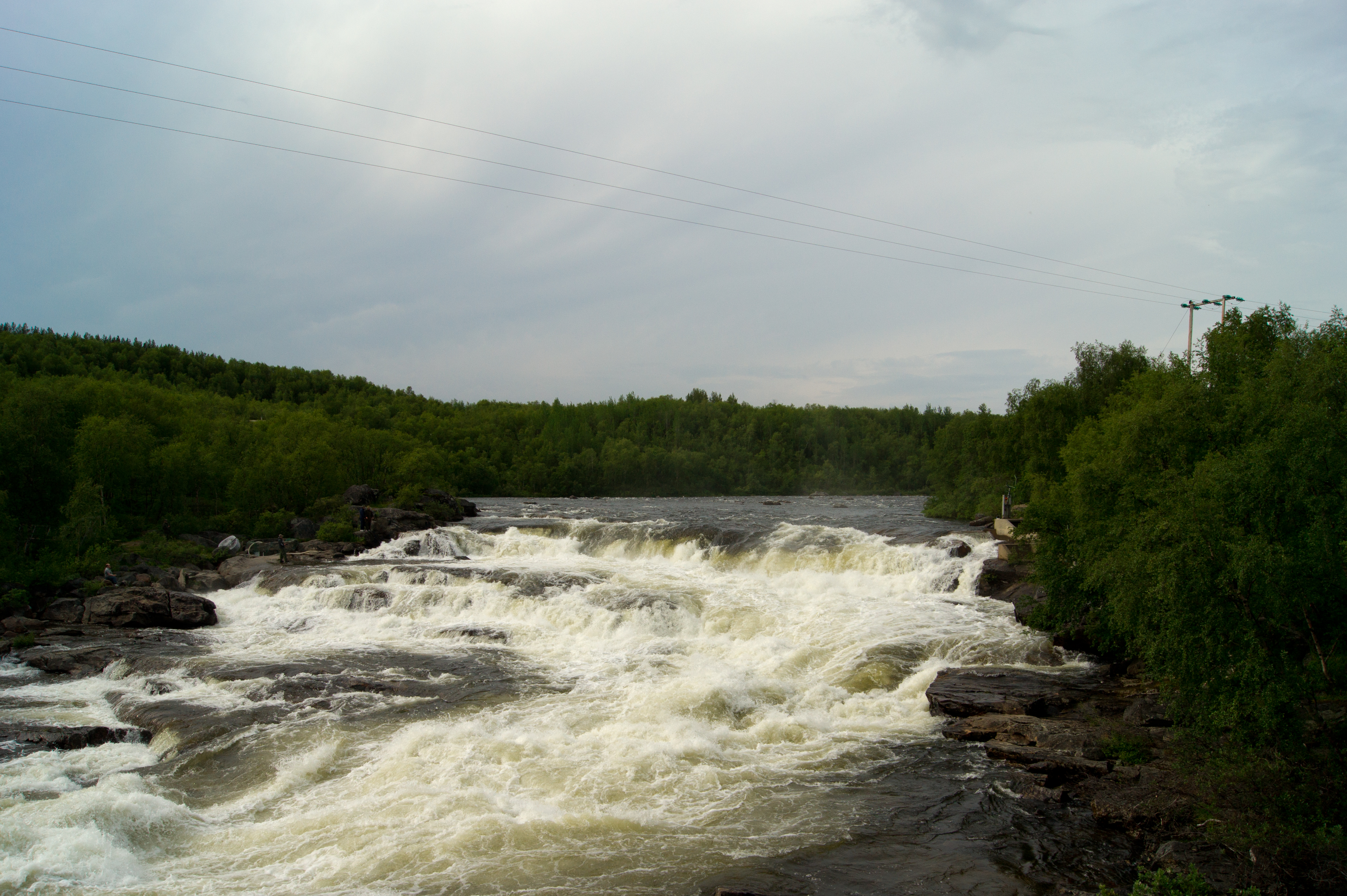
Waterfall on the Näätämö in Norway
