= Skolt Sámi =

Uralic language

- nuõrttsääʹmǩiõll
- Pronunciation: [nuɘrʰtːɕa̟ːmʰʲc͡çiɘlː]
- Native to: Finland, Russia, Norway
- Ethnicity: Skolts
- Native speakers: c. 330 (2002-2023)
- Language family: Uralic: Sámi; Eastern; Mainland; Skolt Sámi
- Dialects: Northern: Neiden; Paatsjoki; Southern: Njuõʹttjäuʹrr; Suõʹnnʼjel
- Writing system: Latin

Language codes
- ISO 639-2: sms
- ISO 639-3: sms
- Glottolog: skol1241
- ELP: Skolt Saami
- Glottopedia: Skolt_Saami
- Skolt Sámi language area (red) within Sápmi (grey)

- Skolt Sámi is classified as Severely Endangered by the UNESCO Atlas of the World's Languages in Danger (2010)

Skolt Sámi (sääʹmǩiõll, pronounced [ɕa̟ːmʰʲc͡çiɘlː], lit. 'the Sámi language'; or nuõrttsääʹmǩiõll, pronounced [nuɘrʰtːɕa̟ːmʰʲc͡çiɘlː], lit. 'the Eastern Sámi language') is a Sámi language that is spoken by the Skolts, with approximately 300 speakers in Finland, mainly in Sevettijärvi and approximately 20–30 speakers of the Njuõʹttjäuʹrr (Notozero) dialect in an area surrounding Lake Notozero in Russia. In Norway, there are fewer than 15 that can speak Skolt Sámi (as of 2023); furthermore, the language is largely spoken in the Neiden area. It is written using a modified Roman orthography which was made official in 1973.

The term Skolt was coined by representatives of the majority culture and has negative connotation which can be compared to the term Lapp. Nevertheless, it is used in cultural and linguistic studies. In 2024, Venke Törmänen, the leader of an NGO called Norrõs Skoltesamene, wrote in Ságat, a Sámi newspaper, saying that the term "Eastern Sámi" ("østsame" in Norwegian) should not be used to refer to the Skolt Sámi.

Sámi dialects and settlements in Russia: Skolt (Russian Notozersky)

== History ==
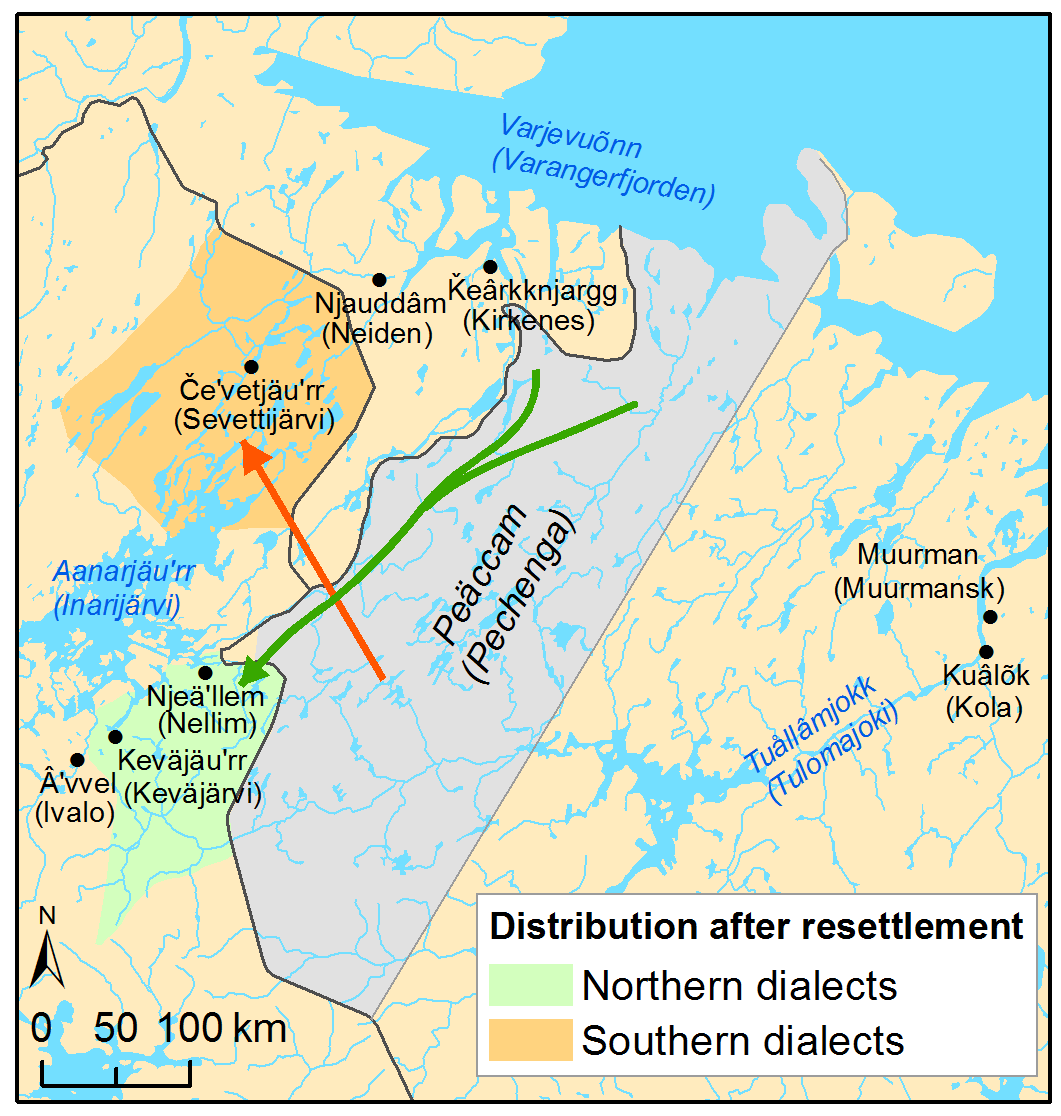
Resettlement of the Skolt Sami from Petsamo

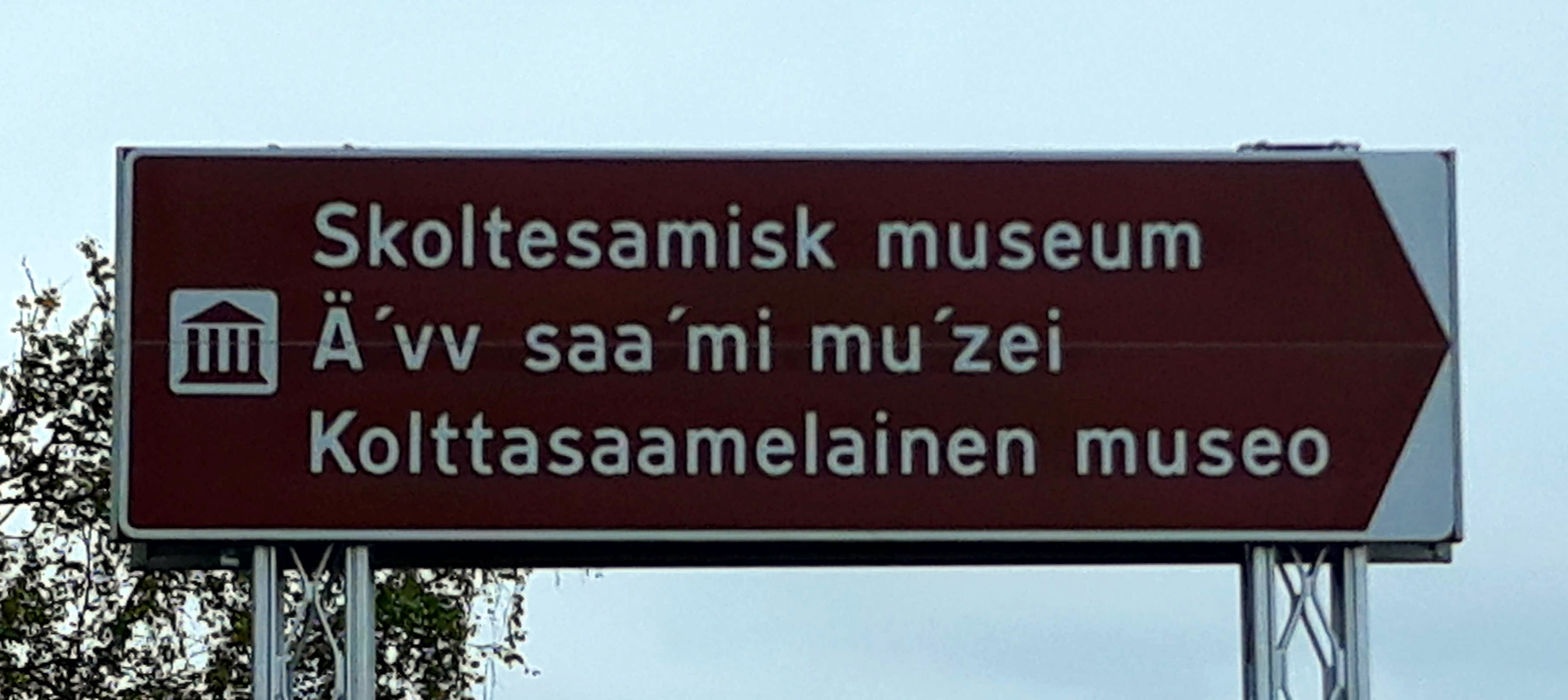
Road sign for the Äʹvv Skolt Sámi Museum in Neiden, Norway. Starting at the top, the lines are in Norwegian, Skolt Sámi, and Finnish.

On Finnish territory Skolt Sámi was spoken in four villages before the Second World War. In Petsamo, Skolt Sámi was spoken in Suonikylä and the village of Petsamo. This area was ceded to Russia in the Second World War, and the Skolts were evacuated to the villages of Nellim, Näätämö and Sevettijärvi in the Inari municipality.

On the Russian (then Soviet) side the dialect was spoken in the now defunct Sámi settlements of Motovsky, Songelsky, Notozero (hence its Russian name – the Notozersky dialect). Some speakers still may live in the villages of Tuloma and Lovozero. Some speakers of "creole" dialects, such as "Gorra" exist in other areas of Russia, with limited surviving vocabulary, living in various communities within Karelia; due to significant influence and use of Russian these creole speakers are not considered speakers of Skolt Sami.

In Norwegian territory, Skolt Sámi was spoken in the Sør-Varanger area with a cultural centre in the village of Neiden. The language is not spoken as mother tongue anymore in Norway.

== Status ==
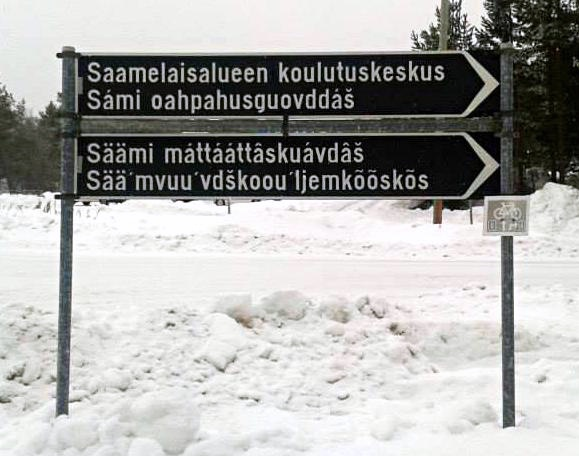
A quadrilingual street sign in Inari in (from top to bottom) Finnish, Northern Saami, Inari Saami, and Skolt Saami. Inari is the only municipality in Finland with four official languages.

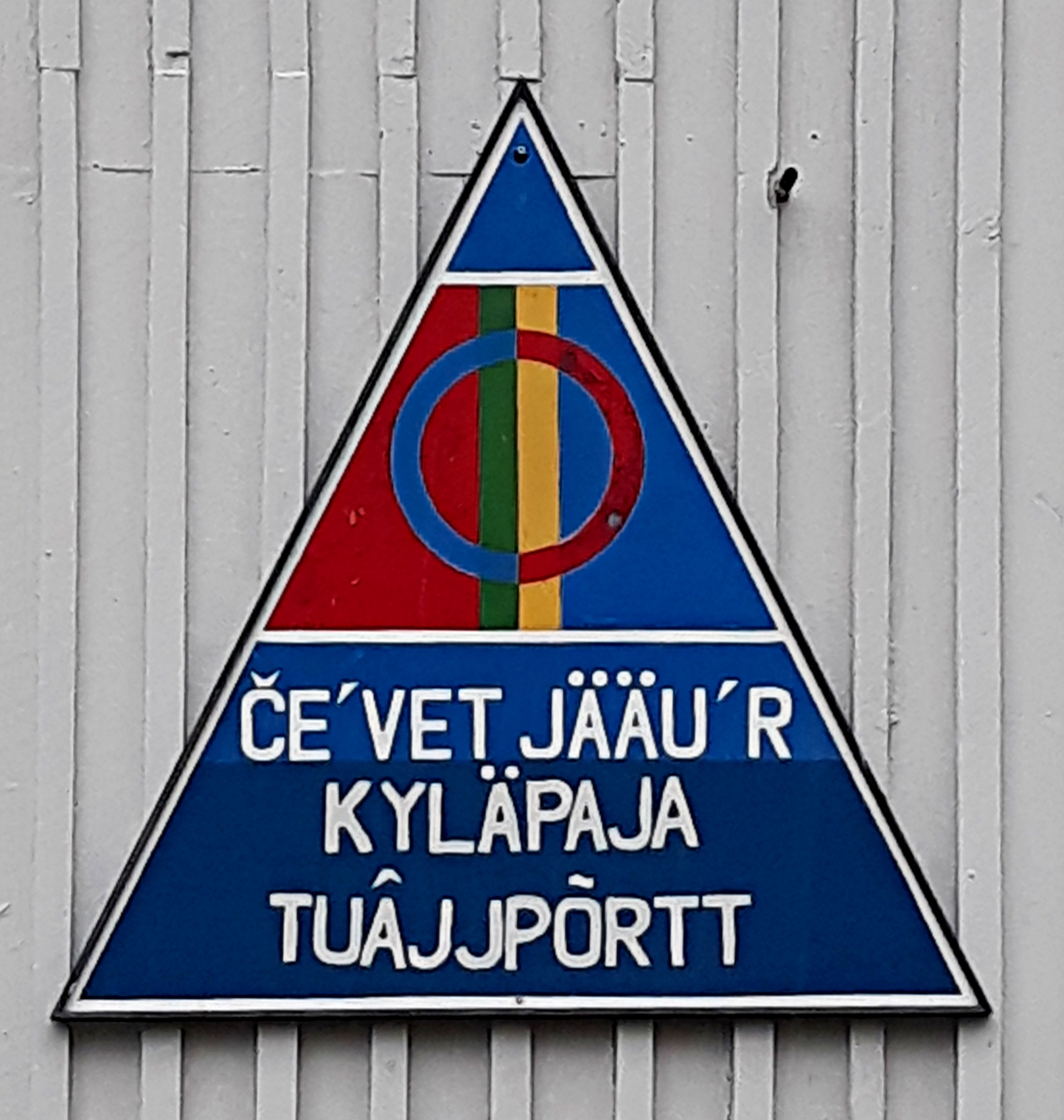
The village workshop in Sevettijärvi

=== Finland ===
In Finland, Skolt Sámi is spoken by approximately 300 or 400 people. According to Finland's Sámi Language Act (1086/2003), Skolt Sámi is one of the three Sámi languages that the Sámi can use when conducting official business in Lapland. It is an official language in the municipality of Inari, and elementary schools there offer courses in the language, both for native speakers and for students learning it as a foreign language. Only a small number of youths learn the language and continue to use it actively. Skolt Sámi is thus a seriously endangered language, even more seriously than Inari Sámi, which has a nearly equal number of speakers and is even spoken in the same municipality. In addition, there are a lot of Skolts living outside of this area, particularly in the capital region.

== Use ==
=== Media ===
From 1978 to 1986, the Skolts had a quarterly called Sääʹmođđâz published in their own language. Since 2013, a new magazine called Tuõddri peeʹrel has been published once a year.

The Finnish news program Yle Ođđasat featured a Skolt Sámi speaking newsreader for the first time on August 26, 2016. Otherwise Yle Ođđasat presents individual news stories in Skolt Sámi every now and then. In addition, there have been various TV programs in Skolt Sámi on YLE such as the children's TV series Binnabánnaš.

=== Religion ===
The first book published in Skolt Sámi was an Eastern Orthodox prayer book (Risttoummi moʹlidvaǩeʹrjj, Prayerbook for the Orthodox) in 1983. Translation of the Gospel of John was published (Evvan evaŋǧeʹlium) in 1988 and Liturgy of Saint John Chrysostom (Pââʹss Eʹččen Evvan Krysostomoozz Liturgia, Liturgy of our Holy Father John Chrysostom) was published in 2002 Skolt Sámi is used together with Finnish in worship of the Lappi Orthodox Parish (Lappi ortodookslaž sieʹbrrkåʹdd) at churches of Ivalo, Sevettijärvi and Nellim.

=== Music ===
Like Inari Sámi, Skolt Sámi has recently borne witness to a new phenomenon, namely it is being used in rock songs sung by Tiina Sanila-Aikio, who has published two full-length CDs in Skolt Sámi to date.

=== Education ===
In 1993, language nest programs for children younger than seven were created. For quite some time these programs received intermittent funding, resulting in some children being taught Skolt Sámi, while others were not. In spite of all the issues these programs faced, they were crucial in creating the youngest generations of Skolt Sámi speakers. In recent years, these programs have been reinstated.

In addition, 2005 was the first time that it was possible to use Skolt Sámi in a Finnish matriculation exam, albeit as a foreign language. In 2012, Ville-Riiko Fofonoff (Skolt Sami: Läärvan-Oʹlssi-Peâtt-Rijggu-Vääʹsǩ-Rijggu-Ville-Reeiǥaž) was the first person to use Skolt Sámi for the mother tongue portion of the exam; for this, he won the Skolt of the Year Award the same year.

== Writing system ==
In 1973, an official, standardized orthography for Skolt Sámi was introduced based on the Suõʹnnʼjel dialect. Since then, it has been widely accepted with a few small modifications. Other examples of Skolt Sami written in Cyrillic script exist in an unofficial capacity. Currently no standardized Cyrillic script exists for Skolt Sami. The Skolt Sámi orthography uses the ISO basic Latin alphabet with the addition of a few special characters:

| Letter | Phoneme(s) | Letter | Phoneme(s) | Letter | Phoneme(s) |
|---|---|---|---|---|---|
| A a | /ɑ/ | Ǧ ǧ | /ɟ͡ʝ/ | Õ õ | /ɘ/ |
| Â â | /ɐ/ | Ǥ ǥ | /ɣ/ | P p | /p/ |
| B b | /b/ | H h | /x/ | R r | /r/ |
| C c | /t͡s/ | I i | /i/, /j/ | S s | /s/ |
| Č č | /t͡ʃ/ | J j | /ʝ/ | Š š | /ʃ/ |
| Ʒ ʒ | /d͡z/ | K k | /k/ | T t | /t/ |
| Ǯ ǯ | /d͡ʒ/ | Ǩ ǩ | /c͡ç/ | U u | /u/, /w/ |
| D d | /d/ | L l | /l/ | V v | /v/ |
| Đ đ | /ð/ | M m | /m/ | Z z | /z/ |
| E e | /e/, /ɛ/ | N n | /n/ | Ž ž | /ʒ/ |
| F f | /f/ | Ŋ ŋ | /ŋ/ | Å å | /ɔ/ |
| G g | /ɡ/ | O o | /o/ | Ä ä | /a/ |

Notes:

- The letters Q/q, W/w, X/x, Y/y and Ö/ö are also used, although only in foreign words or loans. As in Finnish and Swedish Ü/ü is alphabetized as y, not u.
- No difference is made in the standard orthography between /e/ and /ɛ/. In dictionaries, grammars and other reference works, the letter ⟨ẹ⟩ is used to indicate /ɛ/.
- The diagraphs ⟨lj⟩ and ⟨nj⟩ indicate the consonants /ʎ/ and /ɲ/ respectively.

Additional marks are used in writing Skolt Sámi words:

- A prime symbol ʹ (U+02B9 MODIFIER LETTER PRIME) is added after the vowel of a syllable to indicate suprasegmental palatalization. Occasionally a standalone acute accent ´ or ˊ (U+00B4 ACUTE ACCENT or U+02CA MODIFIER LETTER ACUTE ACCENT) is used, but this is not correct.
- An apostrophe ʼ (U+02BC MODIFIER LETTER APOSTROPHE) is used in the combinations ⟨lʼj⟩ and ⟨nʼj⟩ to indicate that these are two separate sounds, not a single sound. It is also placed between identical consonants to indicate that they belong to separate prosodic feet, and should not be combined into a geminate. It distinguishes e.g. lueʹštted "to set free" from its causative lueʹštʼted "to cause to set free".
- A hyphen – is used in compound words when there are two identical consonants at the juncture between the parts of the compound, e.g. ǩiõtt-tel "mobile phone".
- A vertical line ˈ (U+02C8 MODIFIER LETTER VERTICAL LINE), typewriter apostrophe or other similar mark indicates that a geminate consonant is long, and the preceding diphthong is short. It is placed between a pair of identical consonants which are always preceded by a diphthong. This mark is not used in normal Skolt Sámi writing, but it appears in dictionaries, grammars and other reference works.

== Phonology ==
Special features of this Sámi language include a highly complex vowel system and a suprasegmental contrast of palatalized vs. non-palatalized stress groups; palatalized stress groups are indicated by a "softener mark", represented by the ʹ character.

=== Vowels ===
The system of vowel phonemes is as follows:

| | front | central | back |
|---|---|---|---|
| close | i | | u |
| close-mid | e | ɘ | o |
| open-mid | (ɛ) | ɐ | ɔ |
| open | a | | ɑ |

Notes:

- The open-mid front unrounded vowel [ɛ] does not have phonemic status.
- The vowels /y/ and /ø/ occur in some loan words.

Skolt Sámi has vowel length, but it co-occurs with contrasts in length of the following consonant(s). For example, leʹtt 'vessel' vs. leeʹtt 'vessels'.

The vowels can combine to form eight phonemic opening diphthongs (with additional diphthongs being allophones of these eight):

| | front | front to central | back to front | back to central | back |
| close to close-mid | | iɘ | | uɘ | |
| close to open-mid | | iɐ | | uɐ | uɔ |
| close to open | | | ua | | |
| close-mid to open-mid | | eɐ | | | |
| close-mid to open | ea | | | | |

Like the monophthongs, all diphthongs can be short or long, but this is not indicated in spelling. Short diphthongs are distinguished from long ones by both length and stress placement: short diphthongs have a stressed second component, whereas long diphthongs have stress on the first component.

Diphthongs may also have two variants depending on whether they occur in a plain or palatalized environment. This has a clearer effect with diphthongs whose second element is back or central. Certain inflectional forms, including the addition of the palatalizing suprasegmental, also trigger a change in diphthong quality.

| plain | palatalized |
|---|---|
| iõ | iõʹ |
| iâ | ieʹ |
| eâ | eäʹ |
| eä | eäʹ |
| uõ | uõʹ |
| uå | ueʹ |
| uâ | ueʹ |
| uä | uäʹ |

=== Consonants ===
The inventory of consonant phonemes is the following:

| | | Labial | Dental / Alveolar | | Postalveolar | Palatal | Velar |
| | | Labial | plain | sibilant | sibilant | Palatal | Velar |
|---|---|---|---|---|---|---|---|
| Nasal | | m | n | | | ɲ | ŋ |
| Plosive / affricate | voiceless | p | t | t͡s | t͡ʃ | c͡ç | k |
| Plosive / affricate | voiced | b | d | d͡z | d͡ʒ | ɟ͡ʝ | ɡ |
| Fricative | voiceless | (f) | | s | ʃ | | x |
| Fricative | voiced | v | ð | z | ʒ | ʝ | ɣ |
| Trill | | | r | | | | |
| Approximant | central | w | | | | j | |
| Approximant | lateral | | l | | | ʎ | |

- Unvoiced stops and affricates are pronounced preaspirated after vowels and sonorant consonants.
- Older speakers realize the palatal affricates /c͡ç, ɟ͡ʝ/ as plosives [c, ɟ].
- In younger speakers, /t͡ʃ/ merges into /ʃ/, /ð/ into /z/, and /l/ into /w/.
- Younger speakers may also lenite /ɣ/ into [ɰ], and /ʝ/ into [j].
- The voiceless velar fricative /x/ has many allophones. It is realized as [h] in word-initial or stress group-initial environments, and as [ɦ] in intervocalic environments. Within palatalized stress groups, /x/ is realized as [ç].
- /f/ appears only in loanwords, but is nonetheless quite common.
- Voiced plosives /b/, /d/, and /g/ are not fully voiced, realized as [b̥], [d̥], and [g̥].
- Voiced fricatives /v/, /ð/, /z/, /ʒ/, /ʝ/, and /ɣ/ are only weakly voiced, and in unstressed syllables may be fully unvoiced.

Consonants may be phonemically short or long (geminate) both word-medially or word-finally; both are exceedingly common. Similarly to other Sámic languages, there exists a three-way contrast between weak, strong, and overlong consonants (In some reference works, these are referred to as weak, strong, and strong+, or transcribed as C, Cː, and CːC). Overlong consonants do not occur word-finally. Long and short consonants also contrast in consonant clusters, cf. kuõskkâd 'to touch' : kuõskam 'I touch'. A short period of voicelessness or h, known as preaspiration, before geminate consonants is observed, much as in Icelandic, but this is not marked orthographically, e.g. joʹǩǩe 'to the river' is pronounced [jo̟ʰcc͡çe].

=== Suprasegmentals ===
There is one phonemic suprasegmental, the palatalizing suprasegmental that affects the pronunciation of an entire syllable. In written language the palatalizing suprasegmental is indicated with a free-standing acute accent between a stressed vowel and the following consonant, as follows:

vääʹrr [va̘ːrʲːe̥] 'mountain, hill' (suprasegmental palatalization present)
väärr [vaːrːḁ] 'trip' (no suprasegmental palatalization)

The suprasegmental palatalization has three distinct phonetic effects:

- The stressed vowel is pronounced as slightly more fronted in palatalized syllables than in non-palatalized ones.
- When the palatalizing suprasegmental is present, the following consonant or consonant cluster is pronounced as weakly palatalized. Suprasegmental palatalization is independent of segmental palatals: inherently palatal consonants (i.e. consonants with palatal place of articulation) such as the palatal glide /j/, the palatal nasal /ɲ/ (spelled ⟨nj⟩) and the palatal lateral approximant /ʎ/ (spelled ⟨lj⟩) can occur both in non-palatalized and suprasegmentally palatalized syllables.
- If the word form is monosyllabic and ends in a consonant, a non-phonemic weakly voiced or unvoiced vowel is pronounced after the final consonant. This vowel is e-colored if suprasegmental palatalization is present, but a-colored if not.

=== Stress ===
Skolt Sámi has four different levels of stress for words:

- Primary stress
- Secondary stress
- Tertiary stress
- Zero stress

The first syllable of any word is always the primary stressed syllable in Skolt Sámi as Skolt is a fixed-stress language. In words with two or more syllables, the final syllable is quite lightly stressed (tertiary stress) and the remaining syllable, if any, are stressed more heavily than the final syllable, but less than the first syllable (secondary stress).

Using the abessive and the comitative singular in a word appears to disrupt this system, however, in words of more than one syllable. The suffix, as can be expected, has tertiary stress, but the penultimate syllable also has tertiary stress, even though it would be expected to have secondary stress.

Zero stress can be said to be a feature of conjunctions, postpositions, particles and monosyllabic pronouns.

== Morphophonology ==
As in other Sámi and Finnic languages, Skolt Sámi has a system of consonant gradation. In its origins, consonants occurring in the middle of words would change depending on the number and type of consonants occurring in the end of the syllable (e.g. C_{x}V in open syllables, C_{y}VC in syllables closed by one consonant, C_{z}VCC in syllables closed by two consonants). As the language continued to undergo various sound changes, some of the phonetic motivation for those changes has become obscure.

=== Qualitative gradation ===
In this subsystem, non-initial consonants change place of articulation, voicing or manner, and sometimes duration. There are only two variants: strong (i.e. long, voiceless, and/or plosive) and weak (i.e. short, voiced, fricated and/or lenited). In Skolt Sámi, vowel changes often accompany the qualitative gradation.

| Strong Grade | | | | Weak Grade | | | |
|---|---|---|---|---|---|---|---|
| tʃː | / eːtʃː / | eeʹčč | father | ɟʝː | / eːɟʝː / | eeʹjj | fathers |
| cː | / suecː / | sueʹǩǩ | birch | ɟʝː | / sueɟʝː / | sueʹjj | birches |
| kː | / jokː / | jokk | river | ɣː | / joːɣː / | jooǥǥ | rivers |
| tsː | / puɘtsːi / | puõcci | patient | dzː | / puɘdzːi / | puõʒʒi | patients |
| pː | / koːpːʲ / | kååʹpp | hole | v | / koːvːʲ / | kååʹv | hole (acc) |
| sː | / kusː / | kuss | cow | zː | / kuːzː / | kuuzz | cows |
| ʃ | / tobdːmɘʃ / | tobddmõš | feeling | ʒː | / tobdːmɘːʒː / | tobddmõõžž | feelings |
| tː | / ciɘtː / | ǩiõtt | hand | ð | / ciɘð / | ǩiõđ | hand (acc) |
| ðː | / ciðː / | ǩiđđ | spring | ð | / ciːð / | ǩiiđ | spring (acc) |

== Grammar ==
Skolt Sámi is a synthetic, highly inflected language that shares many grammatical features with the other Uralic languages. However, Skolt Sámi is not a typical agglutinative language like many of the other Uralic languages are, as it has developed considerably into the direction of a fusional language, much like Estonian. Therefore, cases and other grammatical features are also marked by modifications to the root and not just marked with suffixes. Many of the suffixes in Skolt Sámi are portmanteau morphemes that express several grammatical features at a time.

=== Umlaut ===
Umlaut is a pervasive phenomenon in Skolt Sámi, whereby the vowel in the second syllable affects the quality of the vowel in the first. The presence or absence of palatalisation can also be considered an umlaut effect, since it is also conditioned by the second-syllable vowel, although it affects the entire syllable rather than the vowel alone. Umlaut is complicated by the fact that many of the second-syllable vowels have disappeared in Skolt Sámi, leaving the umlaut effects as their only trace.

The following table lists the Skolt Sámi outcomes of the Proto-Samic first-syllable vowel, for each second-syllable vowel.

| Proto | *ā, *ō | *ē | *ë, *u | *i |
| Skolt | a | e | â, u | e |
|---|---|---|---|---|
| *ë | â | âʹ | õ | õʹ |
| *o | å | åʹ | o | oʹ |
| *i | e | eʹ | i | iʹ |
| *u | o | uʹ | u | uʹ |
| *ā | ä | äʹ | a | aʹ |
| *ea | eä | eäʹ, iẹʹ | iâ | ieʹ |
| *ie | eâ | ieʹ | iõ | iõʹ |
| *oa | uä | uäʹ, uẹʹ | uå | ueʹ |
| *uo | uâ | ueʹ | uõ | uõʹ |

Some notes:

- iẹʹ and uẹʹ appear before a quantity 2 consonant, eäʹ and uäʹ otherwise.

As can be seen, palatalisation is present before original second-syllable *ē and *i, and absent otherwise. Where they survive in Skolt Sámi, both appear as e, so only the umlaut effect can distinguish them. The original short vowels *ë, *u and *i have a general raising and backing effect on the preceding vowel, while the effect of original *ā and *ō is lowering. Original *ē is fronting (palatalising) without having an effect on height.

=== Nouns ===
==== Cases ====
Skolt Sámi has 9 cases in the singular (7 of which also have a plural form), although the genitive and accusative are often the same.

The following table shows the inflection of čuäcc ('rotten snag') with the single morphemes marking noun stem, number, and case separated by hyphens for better readability. The last morpheme marks for case, i marks the plural, and a is due to epenthesis and does not have a meaning of its own.

| | Singular | Plural |
|---|---|---|
| Nominative | čuäcc [t͡ʃuatt͡s] | čuäʒʒ [t͡ʃuadd͡z] |
| Genitive | čuäʒʒ [t͡ʃuadd͡z] | čuäʒʒ-a-i [t͡ʃuadd͡zɑj] |
| Accusative | čuäʒʒ [t͡ʃuadd͡z] | čuäʒʒ-a-i-d [t͡ʃuadd͡zɑjd] |
| Illative | čuåc'c-u [t͡ʃuɔʰtt͡su] | čuäʒʒ-a-i-d [t͡ʃuadd͡zɑjd] |
| Locative | čuäʒʒ-a-st [t͡ʃuadd͡zɑst] | čuäʒʒ-a-i-n [t͡ʃuadd͡zɑjn] |
| Comitative | čuäʒʒ-a-in [t͡ʃuadd͡zɑjn] | čuäʒʒ-a-i-vuiʹm [t͡ʃuadd͡zɑjvʲu̟i̟m] |
| Abessive | čuäʒʒ-tää [t͡ʃuadd͡ztaː] | čuäʒʒ-a-i-tää [t͡ʃuadd͡zɑjtaː] |
| Essive | čuäcc-a-n [t͡ʃuaʰtt͡sɑn] | – |
| Partitive | čuäcc-a-d [t͡ʃuaʰtt͡sɑd] | – |

===== Nominative =====
Like the other Uralic languages, the nominative singular is unmarked and indicates the subject or a predicate. The nominative plural is also unmarked and always looks the same as the genitive singular.

===== Genitive =====
The genitive singular is unmarked and looks the same as the nominative plural. The genitive plural is marked by an -i. The genitive is used:

- to indicate possession (Tuʹst lij muu ǩeʹrjj.' 'You have my book.' where muu is gen.)
- to indicate number, if said the number is between 2 and 6. (Sieʹzzest lij kuõʹhtt põõrt. 'My father's sister (my aunt) has two houses.', where põõrt is gen.)
- with prepositions (rääi + [GEN]: 'by something', 'beyond something')
- with most postpositions. (Sij mõʹnne ääkkäd årra. 'They went to your grandmother's (house).', 'They went to visit your grandmother.', where ääkkäd is gen)

The genitive has been replacing the partitive for some time and is nowadays more commonly used in its place.

===== Accusative =====
The accusative is the direct object case and it is unmarked in the singular. In the plural, its marker is -d, which is preceded by the plural marker -i, making it look the same as the plural illative. The accusative is also used to mark some adjuncts, e.g. obb tääʹlv ('the entire winter').

===== Locative =====
The locative marker in the singular is -st and -n in the plural. This case is used to indicate:

- where something is: Kuäʹđest lij ǩeʹrjj ('"There is a book in the kota")
- where it is coming from: Niõđ puõʹtte domoi Čeʹvetjääuʹrest ("The girls came home from Sevettijärvi")
- who has possession of something: Suʹst lij čâustõk "'He/she has a lasso"

In addition, it is used with certain verbs:

- to ask someone something: kõõččâd [+loc]

===== Illative =====
The illative marker actually has three different markers in the singular to represent the same case: -a, -e and -u. The plural illative marker is -d, which is preceded by the plural marker -i, making it look the same as the plural accusative. This case is used to indicate:

- where something is going
- who is receiving something
- the indirect object

===== Comitative =====
The comitative is used to state "with whom" or "with what means" something is done. The case marker is -in in the singular and -vuiʹm in the plural.

- Vuõʹlǧǧem paaʹrnivuiʹm ceerkvest. "I left church with the children."
- Vuõʹlǧǧem vueʹbbinan ceerkvest. "I left church with my sister."
- Njääʹlm sekstet leeiʹnin. "The mouth is wiped with a piece of cloth."

To form the comitative singular, use the genitive singular form of the word as the root and -i'. To form the comitative plural, use the plural genitive root and -vuiʹm.

===== Abessive =====
The abessive case is used to state that someone is "without" something. The abessive marker is -tää in both the singular and the plural. It always has a tertiary stress.

- Vuõʹlǧǧem paaʹrnitää ceerkvest. "I left church without the children."
- Sij mõʹnne niõđtää põʹrtte. "They went in the house without the girl."
- Sij mõʹnne niõđitää põʹrtte. "They went in the house without the girls".

===== Essive =====
The dual form of the essive is still used with pronouns, but not with nouns and does not appear at all in the plural.

===== Partitive =====
The partitive is only used in the singular and can be replaced by the genitive in most cases. The partitive marker is -d.

1. It appears after numbers larger than six:

- kääuʹc čâustõkkâd: 'eight lassos'

This can be replaced with kääʹuc čâustõõǥǥ.

2. It is also used with certain postpositions:

- kueʹtted vuâstta: 'against a kota'

This can be replaced with kuäʹđ vuâstta.

3. It can be used with the comparative to express that which is being compared:

- kåʹlled pueʹrab: 'better than gold'

This would nowadays more than likely be replaced by pueʹrab ko kåʹll.

==== Pronouns ====
===== Personal pronouns =====
The personal pronouns have three numbers: singular, plural and dual. The following table contains personal pronouns in the nominative and genitive/accusative cases.

| | singular | dual | plural |
| | nominative | | |
|---|---|---|---|
| 1st person | mon | muäna | mij |
| 2nd person | ton | tuäna | tij |
| 3rd person | son | suäna | sij |
| | genitive | | |
| 1st person | muu | muännai | mij |
| 2nd person | tuu | tuännai | tij |
| 3rd person | suu | suännai | sij |

The next table demonstrates the declension of a personal pronoun he/she (no gender distinction) in various cases:

| | Singular | Dual | Plural |
|---|---|---|---|
| Nominative | son | suäna | sij |
| Genitive | suu | suännai | sij |
| Accusative | suu | suännaid | siʹjjid |
| Illative | suʹnne | suännaid | siʹjjid |
| Locative | suʹst | suännast | siiʹst |
| Comitative | suin | suännain | siʹjjivuiʹm |
| Abessive | suutää | suännaitää | siʹjjitää |
| Essive | suuʹnen | suännan | – |
| Partitive | suuʹđed | – | – |

==== Possessive markers ====
Next to number and case, Skolt Sámi nouns also inflect for possession. However, usage of possessive affixes seems to decrease among speakers. The following table shows possessive inflection of the word muõrr ('tree').

| | | | Possessor | | | | | |
| | | | 1st person | | 2nd person | | 3rd person | |
| | | | Singular | Plural | Singular | Plural | Singular | Plural |
|---|---|---|---|---|---|---|---|---|
| Possessed | Singular | Nominative | muõrram | muõrrâm | muõrrad | muõrrâd | muõrrâs | muõrrâz |
| Possessed | Singular | Accusative/ Genitive | muõrran | muõrrân | muõrad | muõrâd | muõrâs | muõrâz |
| Possessed | Singular | Illative | muõrˈrsan | muõrˈrseen | muõrˈrsad | muõrˈrseed | muõrˈrses | muõrˈrseez |
| Possessed | Singular | Locative | muõrstan | muõrsteen | muõrstad | muõrsteed | muõrstes | muõrsteez |
| Possessed | Singular | Comitative | muõrinan | muõrineen | muõrinad | muõrineed | muõrines | muõrineez |
| Possessed | Singular | Abessive | muõrrantää | muõrrântää | muõradtää | muõrâdtää | muõrâstää | muõrâztää |
| Possessed | Singular | Essive | muõrˈrnan | muõrˈrneen | muõrˈrnad | muõrˈrneed | muõrˈrnes | muõrˈrneez |
| Possessed | Plural | Nominative | muõrran | muõrrân | muõrad | muõrâd | muõrâs | muõrâz |
| Possessed | Plural | Accusative/ Genitive/ Illative | muõrrään | muõreen | muõrääd | muõreed | muõrees | muõreez |
| Possessed | Plural | Locative | muõrinan | muõrineen | muõrinad | muõrineed | muõrines | muõrineez |
| Possessed | Plural | Comitative | muõräänvuiʹm | muõreenvuiʹm | muõräädvuiʹm | muõreedvuiʹm | muõreesvuiʹm | muõreezvuiʹm |
| Possessed | Plural | Abessive | muõrääntää | muõreentää | muõräädtää | muõreedtää | muõreestää | muõreeztää |

=== Verbs ===
Skolt Sámi verbs inflect (inflection of verbs is also referred to as conjugation) for person, mood, number, and tense. A full inflection table of all person-marked forms of the verb kuullâd ('to hear') is given below.

| | Non-past | Past | Potential | Conditional | Imperative |
|---|---|---|---|---|---|
| 1st Person Singular | kuulam | kuʹllem | kuulžem | kuulčem | - |
| 2nd P. Sg. | kuulak | kuʹlliǩ | kuulžiǩ | kuulčiǩ | kuul |
| 3rd P. Sg. | kooll | kuuli | kuulâž | kuulči | koolas |
| 1st Person Plural | kuullâp | kuulim | kuulžep | kuulčim | kuullâp |
| 2nd P. Pl. | kuullveʹted | kuulid | kuulžid | kuulčid | kuullâd |
| 3rd P. Pl. | koʹlle | kuʹlle | kuulže | kuulče | kollaz |
| 4th Person | kuulât | kuʹlleš | kuulžet | kuulčeš | - |

It can be seen that inflection involves changes to the verb stem as well as inflectional suffixes. Changes to the stem are based on verbs being categorized into several inflectional classes. The different inflectional suffixes are based on the categories listed below.

==== Person ====
Skolt Sámi verbs conjugate for four grammatical persons:

- first person
- second person
- third person
- fourth person, also called the indefinite person

==== Mood ====
Skolt Sámi has 5 grammatical moods:

- indicative
- imperative (Pueʹtted sõrgg domoi! 'Come home soon!')
- conditional
- potential
- optative

==== Number ====
Skolt Sámi verbs conjugate for two grammatical numbers:

- singular
- plural

Unlike other Sámi varieties further west, but in common with Kildin Saami, Skolt Sámi verbs do not inflect for dual number. Instead, verbs occurring with the dual personal pronouns appear in the corresponding plural form.

==== Tense ====
Skolt Sámi has 2 simple tenses:

- past (Puõʹttem škoouʹle jåhtta. 'I came to school yesterday.')
- non-past (Evvan puätt mu årra täʹbbe. 'John is coming to my house today.')

and 2 compound tenses:

- perfect
- pluperfect

==== Non-finite verb forms ====
The verb forms given above are person-marked, also referred to as finite. In addition to the finite forms, Skolt Sámi verbs have twelve participial and converb forms, as well as the infinitive, which are non-finite. These forms are given in the table below for the verb kuullâd ('to hear').

| | Verb form |
|---|---|
| Infinitive | kuullâd |
| Action Participle | kuullâm |
| Present Participle | kuulli |
| Past Participle | kuullâm |
| Passive Participle | kullum |
| Progressive Participle | kuullmen |
| Temporal Participle | kuuleen |
| Instrumental Participle | kulleeʹl |
| Abessive Participle | kuulkani |
| Negative converb | kuul, kullu (indicative and imperative mood, form depending on which person) kuulže (potential mood) kuulče (conditional mood) |

==== Auxiliary verbs ====
Skolt Sámi has two auxiliary verbs, one of which is leeʹd (glossed as 'to be'), the other one is the negative auxiliary verb (see the following paragraph).

Inflection of leeʹd is given below.

| | Non-past | Past | Potential | Conditional | Imperative |
|---|---|---|---|---|---|
| 1st Person Singular | leäm | leʹjjem | leʹžžem | leʹččem | – |
| 2nd P. Sg. | leäk | leʹjjiǩ | leʹžžiǩ | leʹččiǩ | leäk'ku |
| 3rd P. Sg. | lij | leäi | leeʹžž | leʹčči | leäǥǥas |
| 1st Person Plural | leäʹp | leeiʹm | leʹžžep | leʹččim | leäkkap |
| 2nd P. Pl. | leäʹped | leeiʹd | leʹžžveʹted | leʹččid | leäkku |
| 3rd P. Pl. | lie, liâ (idiolectal variation) | leʹjje | leʹžže | leʹčče | leäkkaz |
| 4th Person | leät | leʹjješ | leʹžžet | leʹččeš | – |

Lee'd is used, for example, to assign tense to lexical verbs in the conditional or potential mood which are not marked for tense themselves:

- Jiõm âʹte mon ni kõõjjče, jos mon teâđčem, leʹččem veär raajjâm ouddâl.

(negation (1st P. Sg.) – then – 1st P. Sg. – even – ask (negated conditional) – if – 1st P. Sg. – know (1st P. Sg. conditional) – be (1st P. Sg. conditional) – soup – make (past participle, no tense marking) – before)

'I wouldn't even ask if I knew, if I had made soup before!'

===== Negative verb =====
Skolt Sámi, like Finnic and the other Sámi languages, has a negative verb. In Skolt Sámi, the negative verb conjugates according to mood (indicative, imperative and optative), person (1st, 2nd, 3rd and 4th) and number (singular and plural).

| Person | | Indicative | Imperative | Optative |
|---|---|---|---|---|
| 1 | Singular | jiõm | – | – |
| 1 | Plural | jeäʹp | – | jeälˈlap |
| 2 | Singular | jiõk | jeäʹl | |
| 2 | Plural | jeäʹped | jieʹlled | |
| 3 | Singular | ij | – | jeälas |
| 3 | Plural | jie ~ jiâ | – | jeällas |
| 4 | | jeät | – | |

Note that ij + leeʹd is usually written as iʹlla, iʹlleäkku, iʹllää or iʹllä jie + leeʹd is usually written as jeäʹla or jeäʹlä.

Unlike the Sámi languages further west, Skolt Sámi no longer has separate forms for the dual and plural of the negative verb and uses the plural forms for both instead.

=== Word order ===
==== Declarative clauses ====
The most frequent word order in simple, declarative sentences in Skolt Sámi is subject–verb–object (SVO). However, as cases are used to mark relations between different noun phrases, and verb forms mark person and number of the subject, Skolt Sámi word order allows for some variation.

An example of an SOV sentence would be:

- Neezzan suâjjkååutid kuårru. (woman (Pl., Nominative) – protection (Sg., Nominative) + skirt (Pl., Accusative) – sew (3rd P. Pl., Past)) 'The women sewed protective skirts.'

Intransitive sentences follow the order subject-verb (SV):

- Jääuʹr kâʹlmme. (lake (Pl., Nominative) – freeze (3rd P. Pl., Present)) 'The lakes freeze.'

An exception to the SOV word order can be found in sentences with an auxiliary verb. While in other languages, an OV word order has been found to correlate with the auxiliary verb coming after the lexical verb, the Skolt Sámi auxiliary verb leeʹd ('to be') precedes the lexical verb. This has been related to the verb-second (V2) phenomenon which binds the finite verb to at most the second position of the respective clause. However, in Skolt Sámi, this effect seems to be restricted to clauses with an auxiliary verb.

An example of a sentence with the auxiliary in V2 position:

- Kuuskõõzz leʹjje ääld poorrâm. (northern light (Pl., Nominative) – be (3rd P. Pl., Past) – female reindeer (Sg., Accusative) – eat (Past Participle)) 'The northern lights had eaten the female reindeer.'

==== Interrogative clauses ====
===== Polar questions =====
In Skolt Sámi, polar questions, also referred to as yes–no questions, are marked in two different ways. Morphologically, an interrogative particle, -a, is added as an affix to the first word of the clause. Syntactically, the element which is in the scope of the question is moved to the beginning of the clause. If this element is the verb, subject and verb are inversed in comparison to the declarative SOV word order.

- Vueʹlǧǧveʹted–a tuäna muu ooudâst eččan ääuʹd ool? (leave (2nd P. Pl., Present, Interrogative) – 2nd P. Dual Nominative – 1st P. Sg. Genitive – behalf – father (Sg. Genitive 1st P. Pl.) – grave (Sg. Genitive) – onto) 'Will the two of you go, on my behalf, to our father's grave?'

If an auxiliary verb is used, this is the one which is moved to the initial sentence position and also takes the interrogative affix.

- Leäk–a ääʹvääm tõn uus? (be (2nd P. Sg., Present, Interrogative) – open (Past Participle) – that (Sg. Accusative) – door (Sg. Accusative)) 'Have you opened that door?'
- Leäk–a ton Jefremoff? (be (2nd P. Sg., Interrogative) – 2nd P. Sg. Nominative – Jefremoff) 'Are you Mr. Jefremoff?'

A negated polar question, using the negative auxiliary verb, shows the same structure:

- Ij–a kõskklumâs villjad puättam? (Negation 3rd P. Sg., Interrogative – middle – brother (Sg. Nominative, 2nd P. Sg.) – come (Past Participle)) 'Didn't your middle brother come?'

An example of the interrogative particle being added to something other than the verb, would be the following:

- Võl–a lie mainnâz? (still (Interrogative) – be (3rd P. Sg., Present) – story (Pl., Nominative)) 'Are there still stories to tell?'

===== Information questions =====
Information questions in Skolt Sámi are formed with a question word in clause-initial position. There also is a gap in the sentence indicating the missing piece of information. This kind of structure is similar to Wh-movement in languages such as English. There are mainly three question words corresponding to the English 'what', 'who', and 'which' (out of two). They inflect for number and case, except for the latter which only has singular forms. It is noteworthy that the illative form of mii ('what') corresponds to the English 'why'. The full inflectional paradigm of all three question words can be found below.

| | | What | Who | Which |
|---|---|---|---|---|
| Singular | Nominative | mii | ǩii | kuäbbaž |
| Singular | Accusative | mâiʹd | ǩeän | kuäbba |
| Singular | Genitive | mõõn | ǩeän | kuäbba |
| Singular | Illative | mõõzz ('why') | ǩeäzz | kuäbbže |
| Singular | Locative | mâʹst | ǩeäʹst | kuäbbast |
| Singular | Comitative | mõin | ǩeäin | kuäbbain |
| Singular | Abessive | mõntää | ǩeäntää | kuäbbatää |
| Singular | Essive | mââʹden | ǩeäʹđen | kuäbbžen |
| Singular | Partitive | mââʹđed | ǩeäʹđed | kuäbbžed |
| Plural | Nominative | mõõk | ǩeäk | - |
| Plural | Accusative | mâid | ǩeäid | - |
| Plural | Genitive | mââi | ǩeäi | - |
| Plural | Illative | mâid | ǩeäid | - |
| Plural | Locative | mâin | ǩeäin | - |
| Plural | Comitative | mââivuiʹm | ǩeäivuiʹm | - |
| Plural | Abessive | mââitää | ǩeäitää | - |

Some examples of information questions using one of the three question words:

- Mâiʹd reäǥǥak? (what (Sg., Accusative) – cry (2nd P. Sg., Present)) 'What are you crying about?'
- Mõõzz pueʹttiǩ? (what (Sg., Illative) – come (2nd P. Sg., Past)) 'Why did you come?'
- Ǩii tuʹst leäi risttjeäʹnn? (who (Sg., Nominative) – 2nd P. Sg., Locative – be (3rd P. Sg., Past) – godmother (Sg., Nominative) 'Who was your godmother?'
- Kuäbbaž alttad heibbad? (which (Sg., Nominative) – begin (3rd P. Sg., Present) – wrestle (Infinitive)) 'Which one of you will begin to wrestle?'

In addition to the above-mentioned, there are other question words which are not inflected, such as the following:

- koʹst 'where', 'from where'
- koozz 'to where'
- kuäʹss 'when'
- mäʹhtt 'how'
- måkam 'what kind'

An example sentence would be the following:

- Koozz vuõʹlǧǧiǩ? (to where – leave (2nd P. Sg., Past)) 'Where did you go?'

==== Imperative clauses ====
The Skolt Sámi imperative generally takes a clause-initial position. Out of the five imperative forms (see above), those of the second person are most commonly used.

- Puäʹđ mij årra kuâssa! (come (2nd P. Sg., Imperative) – 1st P. Pl., Genitive – way – on a visit) 'Come and visit us at our place!'

Imperatives in the first person form, which only exist as plurals, are typically used for hortative constructions, that is for encouraging the listener (not) to do something. These imperatives include both the speaker and the listener.

- Äʹlǧǧep heibbad! (start (1st P. Pl., Imperative) – wrestle (Infinitive)) 'Let's start to wrestle!'

Finally, imperatives in the third person are used in jussive constructions, the mood used for orders and commands.

- Kuärŋŋaz sij tieʹrm ool! (climb (3rd P. Pl., Imperative) – 3rd P. Pl., Nominative – hill (Sg., Genitive) – onto) 'Let them climb to the top of the hill!'v329–330

== Lexicon ==
=== Kinship terms ===
Kinship terms in Skolt Sámi mostly descend from proto-Uralic or proto-Samic. However, as in many other Uralic languages, the word for "son" is a borrowing (päʹrnn, from Germanic barna).

Nuclear family
| | mother | father | daughter | son | sister | brother |
|---|---|---|---|---|---|---|
| Skolt Sámi | jeäʹn'n | eʹčč | nijdd | âʹlǧǧ | vuäʹbˈb | villj |
| Northern Sámi | eadni | áhčči | nieida | bárdni | oabbá | viellja |
| Finnish | äiti (emä) | isä | tytär | poika | sisko | veli |
| Komi | мам (mam) | ай (aj) | ныв (nɨv) | детина (djetina) | соч (soč) | вок (vok) |

For extended family members, Skolt Sámi distinguishes not only the relationship to ego, but also their gender, age and their own relationship to one's nuclear family.

Extended family
| Grandmother | | | äkk |
| Grandfather | | | äʹjj |
| Aunt | maternal | older than mother | kuäʹsǩǩ |
| Aunt | maternal | younger than mother | mueʹđđ |
| Aunt | paternal | | sieʹss |
| Aunt | uncle's wife | | eʹmm |
| Uncle | maternal | | jeänn |
| Uncle | paternal | older than father | jiẹʹǩǩ |
| Uncle | paternal | younger than father | čiẹʹcc |
| Niece or Nephew | older sister's child | | kuäʹsǩ'ǩev |
| Niece or Nephew | younger sister's child | | mueʹđ'đev |
| Niece or Nephew | older brother's child | | jiẹʹǩ'ǩev |
| Niece or Nephew | younger brother's child | | čiẹʹc'cev |
| Cousin | female | | vuäʹrnnbiẹʹll |
| Cousin | male | | viʹlljbiẹʹll |

=== Reindeer husbandry words ===
Traditionally, the Sámi are reindeer herders, and as such, Sámi languages have developed a wide vocabulary with terms to describe both the animal and actions related to its husbandry. These terms describe not only gender and age but also their color, their position in the herd, and others. Below are only some of the underived words, and many other possibilities exist in compounds, especially with -puäʒʒ and -čuäʹrvv as head words: paaspuäʒʒ "an angry reindeer", njäʹbllpuäʒʒ, "a quiet reindeer", koomčuäʹrvv "a reindeer with curved antlers", etc.

General types of reindeer
| reindeer | untamed | unmarked | wild reindeer | reindeer stag | male | young male | female | young female | rutting | castrated | recently castrated |
|---|---|---|---|---|---|---|---|---|---|---|---|
| puäʒʒ | udam | kåʹdd | tääjjai | sââʹrves | jeäʹrǧǧ | jeärǥaž | äldd | njerr | kåålvak | spaaiʹliǩ | kääʹcǩiǩ |

Reindeer by age and sex
| | Calf younger than 3 months | Calf before its first winter | First-winter calf | Two-year old | Three-year old | Four-year old | Five-year old | Six-year old or older |
|---|---|---|---|---|---|---|---|---|
| Male | čiõppârjvueʹss | vueʹss | čiõrmiǩ | ååʹreǩ | vueiʹres | kååddas | kooiskõs | - |
| Female | čiõppârjvueʹss | vueʹss | čiõrmiǩ | vuõnjâl | vuõnjâlvaajj | kååddasäldd | kådsnjerräldd | vueʹsstiiudâš |

Types of reindeer by color
| white | black | quite light | light gray with a black back |
|---|---|---|---|
| juʹvjj | saʹmjaʹd | čuõivâk | kulggâd |

=== Numerals ===
Skolt Sámi numerals 1-7 descend from Proto-Uralic, whereas the numeral 10 descends from Proto-Finno-Ugric. All numerals are declined like other nouns in the language.

1-10 (Nominative)
| Cardinal | | Ordinal | |
|---|---|---|---|
| 1 | õhtt | 1st | vuõss(mõs) |
| 2 | kueʹhtt | 2nd | nuʹbb |
| 3 | koumm | 3rd | kuälmad |
| 4 | nellj | 4th | neelljad |
| 5 | vitt | 5th | viiđad |
| 6 | kutt | 6th | kuuđad |
| 7 | čiččâm | 7th | čiiččad |
| 8 | kääuʹc | 8th | kääucad |
| 9 | ååuʹc ~ åʹhcc | 9th | ååucad |
| 10 | lååi | 10th | lååǥǥad |

== Bibliography ==
- Feist, Timothy (2010). A Grammar of Skolt Saami (PhD thesis). Manchester, England: University of Manchester.
- Feist, Timothy (2015). A Grammar of Skolt Saami. Helsinki, Finland: Suomalais-Ugrilainen Seura.
- Korhonen, Mikko; Mosnikoff, Jouni; Sammallahti, Pekka, eds. (1973). Koltansaamen opas. Castrenianumin toimitteita. Vol. 4. Helsinki, Finland: Castrenianum. ISBN 978-951-45-0189-0.
- Mosnikoff, Jouni; Sammallahti, Pekka (1988). Uʹcc sääm-lääʹdd sääʹnnǩeârjaž = Pieni koltansaame-suomi sanakirja. Ohcejohka, Finland: Jorgaleaddji oy. ISBN 978-951-8939-02-6.
- Mosnikoff, Jouni; Sammallahti, Pekka (1991). Suomi-koltansaame sanakirja = Lääʹdd-sääʹm sääʹnnǩeʹrjj. Ohcejohka, Finland: Girjegiisá oy.
- Moshnikoff, Satu (1987). Muu vuõssmõs sääʹmǩeʹrjj. Ruäʹvnjargg, Finland: Painatuskeskus Oy.
- Sámi Language Act [Unofficial translation] (PDF) (1086). Helsinki, Finland: Suomen eduskunta. 2003. Archived from the original (PDF) on 29 September 2007.
- Sergejeva, Jelena (2002). "The Eastern Sámi Languages and Language Preservation". Samiska i ett nytt årtusende [Sámi in a New Millennium]. Copenhagen, Denmark: Nordiska ministerrådet. p. 103.
