= Karelia =

Area of northern Europe

Coordinates: 63°N 32°E

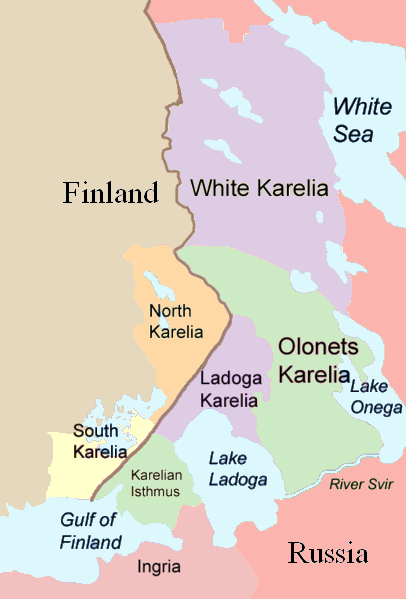
The parts of Karelia, as divided today

Flags of Karelia
The flag of North Karelia (left), the Karelian nationalist flag (center), and the flag of the Republic of Karelia (right)
Coats of arms of Karelia
The two coats of arms of Karelia: the Finno-Karelian design (left, with crown) and the Russian design (right, with bear)

Karelia (/kəˈriːliə, kəˈriːljə/; Karelian and Finnish: Karjala [ˈkɑrjɑlɑ]; Livvi: Karjal; Russian: Каре́лия, romanized: Kareliya [kɐˈrʲelʲɪjə], historically Коре́ла, Korela [kɐˈrʲelʲə]; Swedish: Karelen [kɑˈreːlen]) is a cultural region and area in Northern Europe of historical significance for Russia (including the Soviet era), Finland, and Sweden. It is divided between northwestern Russia (the federal subjects of the Republic of Karelia and Leningrad Oblast) and Finland (the regions of South Karelia, North Karelia, and the eastern portion of Kymenlaakso).

== Use of name ==
Various regions may be called Karelia. Finnish Karelia is a historical province of Finland and is now divided between Finland and Russia, often called just Karjala in Finnish. The eastern part of this chiefly Lutheran area was ceded to Russia after the Winter War of 1939–40.

The Republic of Karelia is a Russian federal subject, including East Karelia, with a chiefly Russian Orthodox population.

Within present-day Finland, Karjala refers to the regions of South and North Karelia, although parts of historical Karelia also lie within the region of Kymenlaakso (east of the River Kymi), North Savo (Kaavi, Rautavaara and Säyneinen), and South Savo (Mäntyharju).

== Geography ==
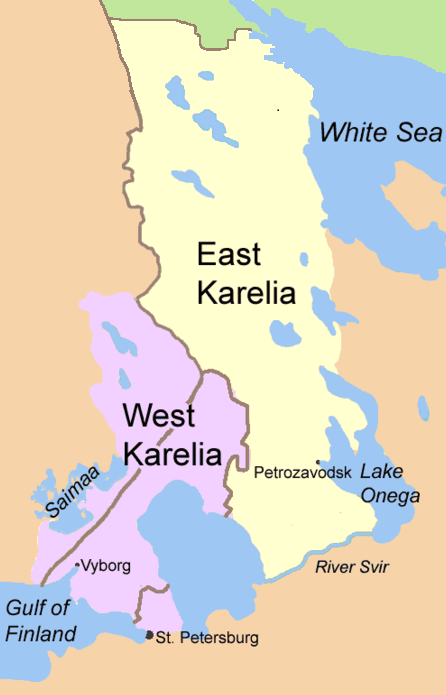
East Karelia and West Karelia with 1939 and 1940–1947 borders. They are also known as Russian Karelia and Finnish Karelia, respectively.

Karelia stretches from the White Sea coast to the Gulf of Finland. It contains the two largest lakes in Europe, Lake Ladoga and Lake Onega. The Karelian Isthmus is located between the Gulf of Finland and Lake Ladoga. The highest point of Karelia, the 576-metre-high (1,890 ft) Nuorunen, is located on the Russian side of the Maanselkä hill region.

The border between Karelia and Ingria, the land of the closely related Ingrian people, had originally been the Neva River itself but later on it was moved northward into the Karelian isthmus to follow the Sestra River (Russian: Сестра), today in the Saint Petersburg metropolitan area, but in 1812–1940 the Russo-Finnish border.

On the other side of Lake Ladoga, the River Svir is usually thought of as the traditional southern border of Karelian territory while Lake Onega and the White Sea mark the Eastern border. The River Kymi marks the historic western border of Karelian territory as it served as the boundary between the Häme Finns and the Karelians during the Middle Ages. The River Kymi is also said to have formed a boundary between the eastern and western cultural spheres by the beginning of the Bronze Age at the latest. In the North lived the nomadic Samis, but there were no natural borders except for large wooded areas (taiga) and the tundra.

In historical texts, Karelia is sometimes divided into East Karelia and West Karelia, which are also called Russian Karelia and Finnish Karelia respectively. The area to the north of Lake Ladoga which belonged to Finland before World War II is called Ladoga Karelia, and the parishes on the old pre-war border are sometimes called Border Karelia. White Karelia (sometimes the Finnish or Karelian term "Viena Karelia", or in some English-language sources, "White Sea Karelia", is used) is the northern part of East Karelia and Olonets Karelia is the southern part.

Tver Karelia denotes the villages in the Tver Oblast that are inhabited by Tver Karelians.

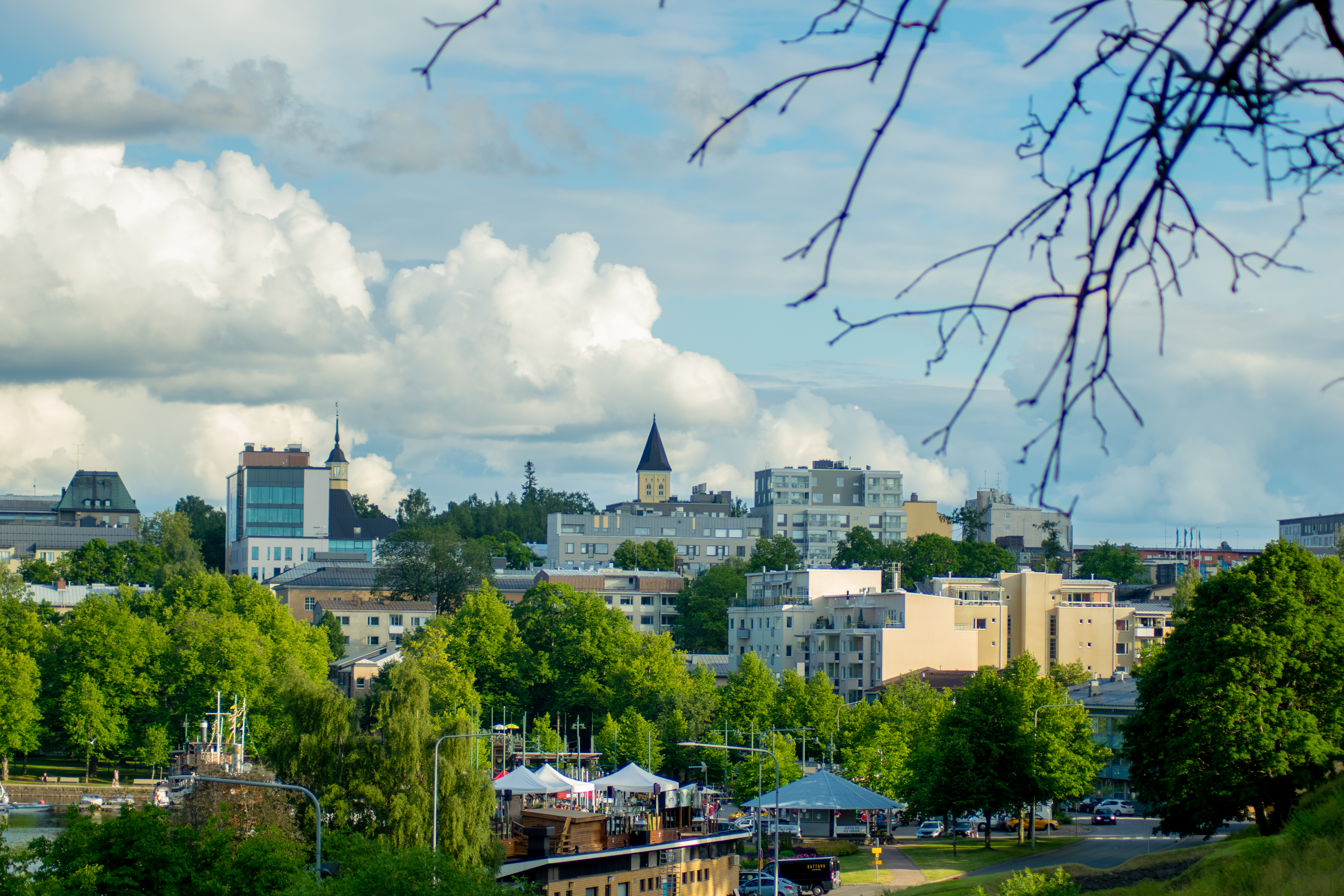
View of Lappeenranta, South Karelia.

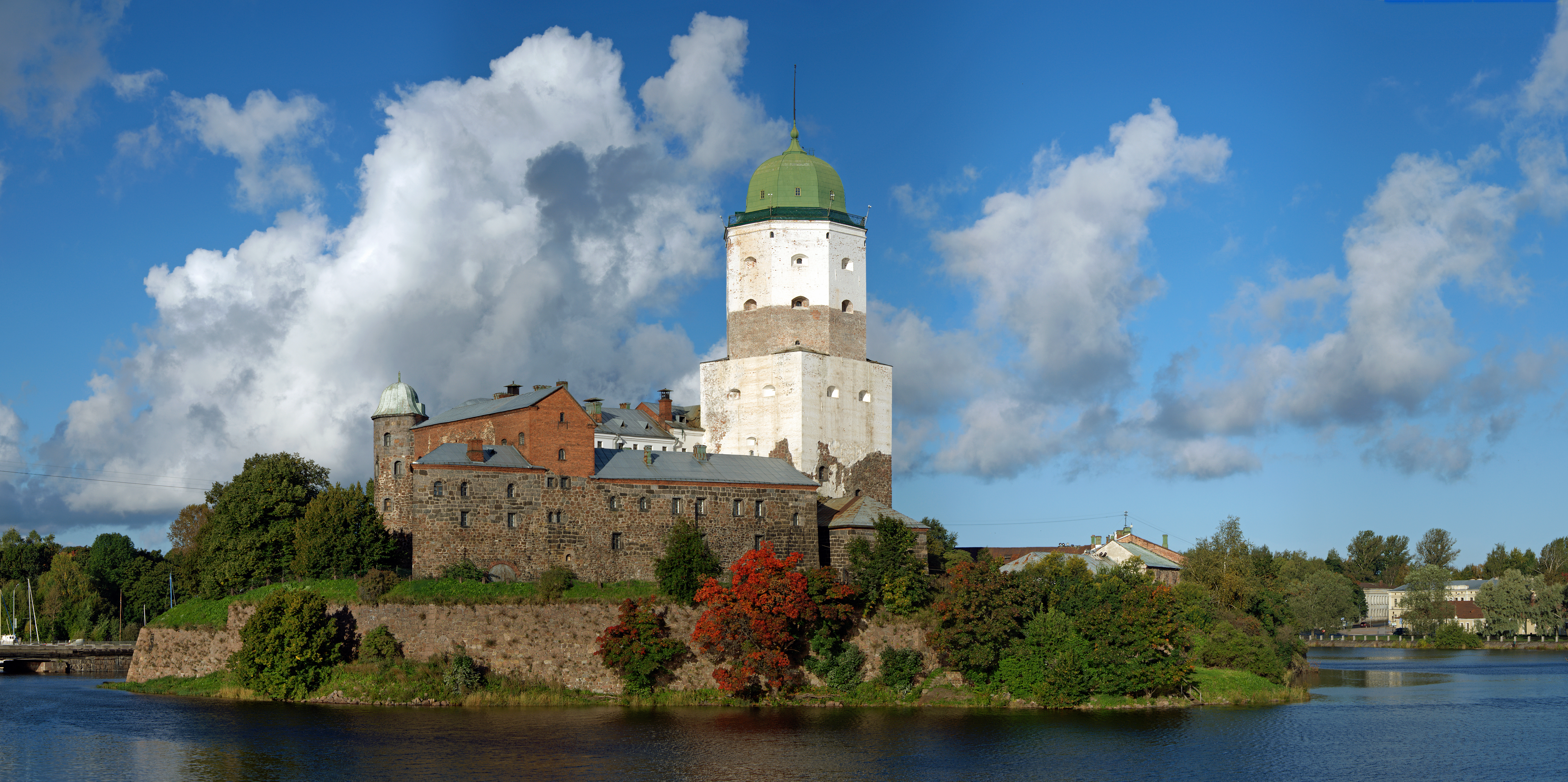
Viipuri Castle on the Gulf of Finland in the city of Vyborg. Viipuri was called the capital of Karelia when it was a part of Finland.

=== Inhabited localities ===
- Republic of Karelia
  - Petrozavodsk (Петрозаводск, Petroskoi, from late 1941 to 1944 known to Finns as Äänislinna/Onegaborg)
  - Belomorsk (Беломорск, Sorokka)
  - Medvežyegorsk (Медвежьегорск, Karhumäki)
  - Kalevala (Калевала, Uhtua)
  - Kem (Кемь, Vienan Kemi, compare with Kemi)
  - Kostomukša (Костомукша, Kostamus)
  - Kondopoga (Кондопога, Kontupohja)
  - Sortavala (Сортавала, Sortavala, Sordavala)
  - Suojarvi (Суоярви, Suojärvi)
  - Segeža (Сегежа, Sekehe)
  - Pitkjaranta (Питкяранта, Pitkäranta)
  - Olonec (Олонец, Aunus)
- Karelian Isthmus
  - Vyborg (Выборг, Viipuri, Viborg)
  - Priozersk (Приозерск, Käkisalmi, Kexholm)
  - Primorsk (Примо́рск, Koivisto, Björkö)
  - Svetogorsk (Светого́рск, Enso)
- South Karelia
  - Imatra
  - Joutseno
  - Lappeenranta (Villmanstrand)
- North Karelia
  - Joensuu
  - Ilomantsi (Ilomants)
  - Kitee
  - Kesälahti
  - Kontiolahti
  - Lieksa
  - Liperi
  - Nurmes
  - Outokumpu

== History ==
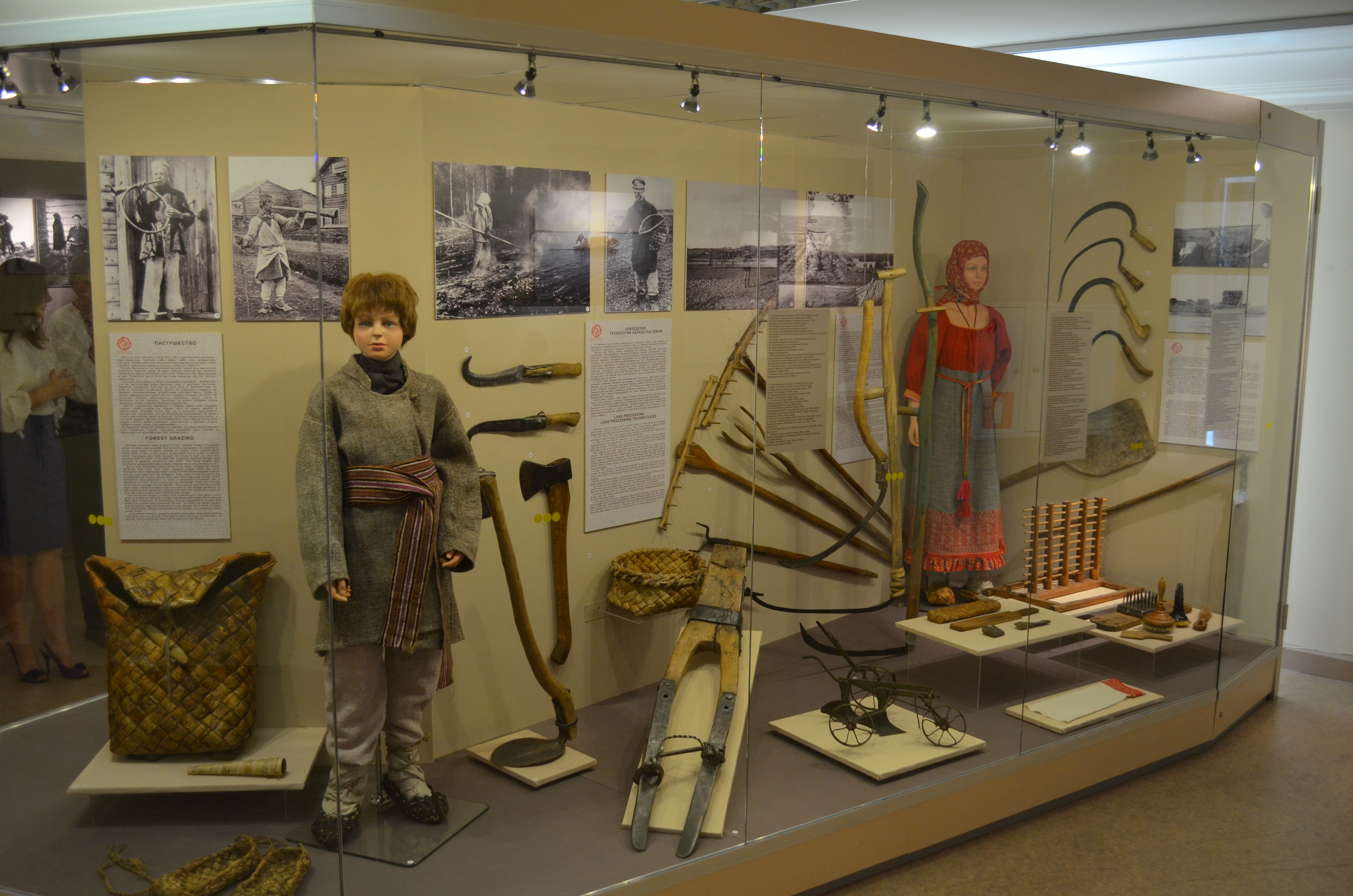
National Museum of the Republic of Karelia

During the Early Middle Ages, settlers from western Finland mixed with the local population to form the Karelian ethnic group. Possible migration from elsewhere may also have contributed to the Karelian ethnic composition.

Archeological evidence indicates that Karelian inhabitation was highest along the western shore of Lake Ladoga and the Karelian Isthmus, with multiple cemeteries and other archeological discoveries dating from AD 600 to AD 800. In South Karelia, the number of archeological discoveries from this time period is lower, though permanent inhabitation was nonetheless present. Lappee, South Karelia has been continuously inhabited for approximately 2,000 years. In North Karelia, only one archeological discovery from this time period has been found, dating to the eighth century. The considerably higher number of archeological discoveries in these regions from AD 800 to AD 1050 indicates that the Karelian population grew and expanded rapidly during this time.

Karelia was bitterly fought over by Sweden and the Novgorod Republic for a period starting in the 13th-century Swedish-Novgorodian Wars. The Treaty of Nöteborg (Finnish: Pähkinäsaaren rauha) in 1323 divided Karelia between the two. Sweden received the southern portion of the Karelian Isthmus and most of South Karelia. The province of Swedish Karelia would include this territory, plus the region east of the Kymi river, with Viborg (Finnish: Viipuri) becoming the capital of the province. Novgorod received the northern portion of the Karelian Isthmus. North Karelia, Ladoga Karelia, and the northern portion of South Karelia fell under Novgorodian control. Käkisalmi served as the main population center of this region.

In the Treaty of Stolbovo of 1617, large parts of Russian Karelia were ceded to Sweden. Conflicts between the new Swedish rulers and the indigenous population of these areas led to an exodus: thousands of Karelians, including the ancestors of the Tver Karelians, emigrated to Russia.

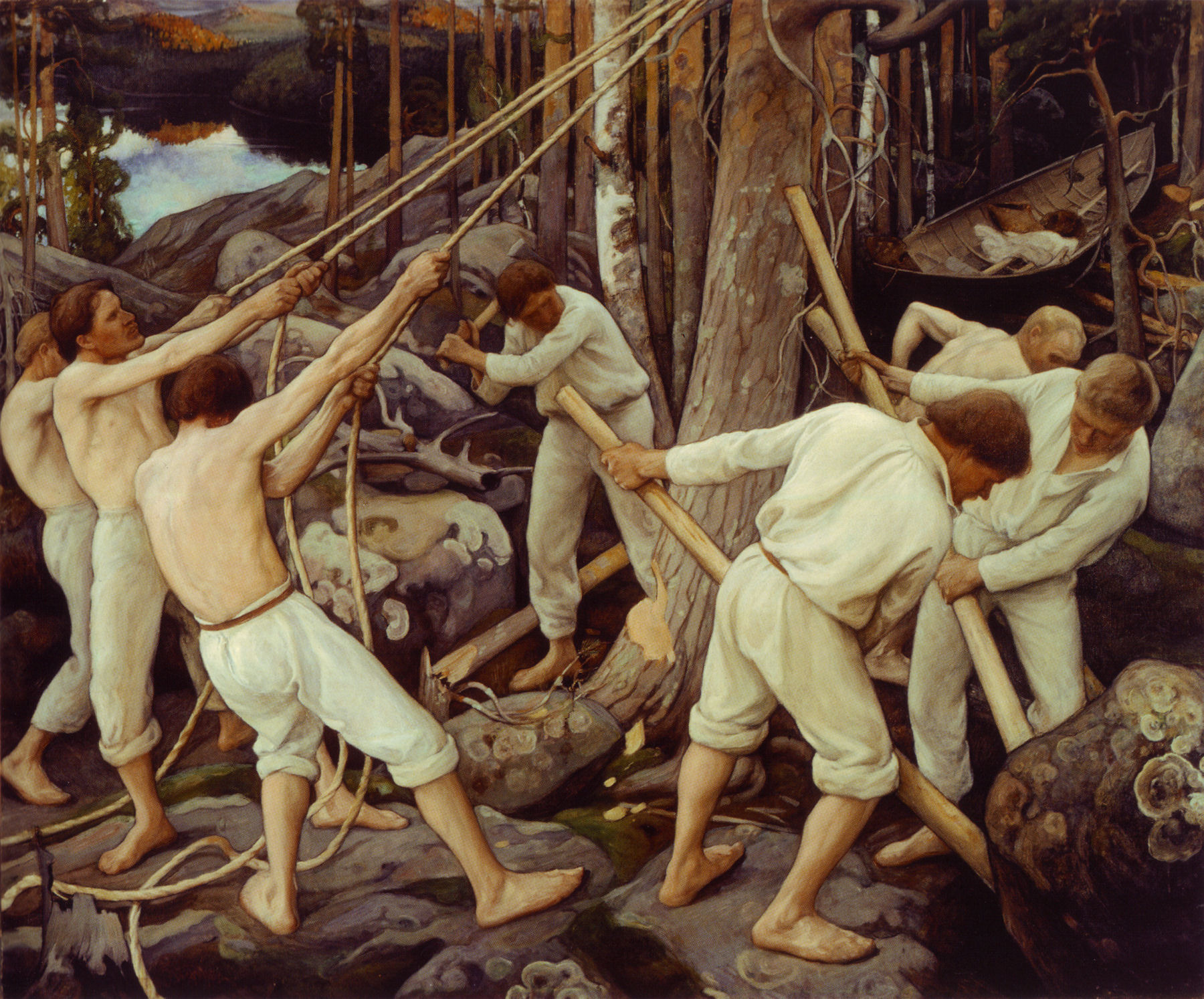
Pioneers in Karelia, 1900, by Pekka Halonen

The Treaty of Nystad (Finnish: Uudenkaupungin rauha) in 1721 between Imperial Russia and Sweden ceded a portion of Karelia to Russia. The Treaty of Åbo in 1743 between Sweden and Russia then ceded South Karelia to Russia. After Finland had been occupied by Russia in the Finnish War, the ceded provinces (Old Finland) were incorporated into the Grand Duchy of Finland in 1812. In 1917, Finland declared independence, and the border was confirmed by the Treaty of Tartu in 1920.

Finnish partisans were involved in attempts to overthrow the Bolsheviks in Russian Karelia (East Karelia) in 1918–1921, as in the failed Aunus expedition. They also wanted to incorporate the rest of Karelia into Finland and cooperated with the short-lived Republic of Uhtua. These mainly private expeditions ended after the signing of the Treaty of Tartu. After the end of the Russian Civil War and the establishment of the Soviet Union in 1922, the Russian part of Karelia became the Karelian autonomous republic of the Soviet Union (ASSR) in 1923.

Historical Finnish Karelia (territory in modern-day Finland shown in dark blue, territory in modern-day Russia shown in lighter blue)

At the beginning of the Second World War in 1939, the Soviet Union attacked Finland, thus starting the Winter War. The war ended with the signing of the Moscow Peace Treaty in March 1940, which handed a large portion of Finnish Karelia to the Soviet Union, and over 400,000 people had to be relocated within Finland. During the Continuation War of 1941–1944, Finland took back territory ceded in 1940, and also invaded and occupied much of East Karelia. Finland was forced out of these regions in 1944. After the war, Soviet expansion caused considerable bitterness in Finland, which lost its fourth biggest city, Viipuri, its industrial heartland along the river Vuoksi, the eastern portion of the Saimaa canal that connected central Finland to the Gulf of Finland, and access to the fishing waters of Lake Ladoga (Finnish: Laatokka). One eighth of its citizens became refugees with no chance of return. The whole population from the areas ceded to the Soviet Union was evacuated and resettled in other parts of Finland. The present inhabitants of the former Finnish parts of Russia, including the city of Vyborg/Viipuri and the Karelian Isthmus, are post-war immigrants or their descendants.

The former Karelian ASSR was incorporated into a new Karelo-Finnish SSR from 1941 to 1956, but then it became an ASSR again. Karelia was the only Soviet republic that was "demoted" from an SSR to an ASSR within the Russian SFSR. In 1991, with the collapse of the Soviet Union, the ASSR became the Republic of Karelia.

The portion of Viipuri Province that remained within Finland following the Second World War was renamed Kymi Province, and kept this name from 1945 to 1997. The eastern part of this province is now the region of South Karelia, while the western portion is part of Kymenlaakso.

== Politics ==
Karelia is politically divided between Finland and Russia. The Republic of Karelia is a federal subject of Russia formed in 1991 from the Karelian ASSR. The Karelian Isthmus belongs to the Leningrad Oblast. The Finnish side consists of parts of the regions (maakunta) of South Karelia, North Karelia and Kymenlaakso.

There are some small groups of Finns campaigning for closer ties between Finland and Karelia: for instance, in the Karjalan Liitto (Karelian League) and ProKarelia.

== Demographics ==
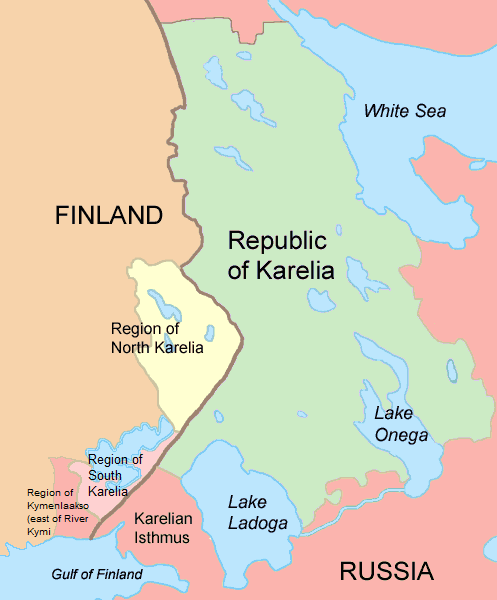
Map showing the Republic of Karelia and the Finnish regions

On the Finnish side, the area is Finnish-speaking. The South Karelian dialects of the Finnish language (closely related to the Karelian language) are spoken in South Karelia. The eastern Savonian dialects are spoken in North Karelia, part of the group of dialects spoken in Eastern and Central Finland.

Ingrian Finnish dialects are spoken in Ingria, an area around St. Petersburg between the Estonian border and Lake Ladoga. Ingrian Finns settled in the region in the 17th century after the Swedish conquest of the area. The settlers spoke Karelian and Savonian dialects of Finnish. The older inhabitants of Ingria, the Ingrians, have their own language which is related to the Karelian language and the south-eastern dialects of Finnish.

Karelians evacuated from the part of Finnish Karelia ceded to Russia were resettled all over Finland. Today about one million people in Finland can trace their roots in the area ceded to the Soviet Union after World War II. In Finland, about 5,000 people speak the Karelian language.

== Culture ==
- Kalevala
- Karelian Bear Dog
- Karelian hot pot
- Karelian language
- Karelian pasties
- Karelo-Finnish Laika
- Music of Karelia

== Tourism ==
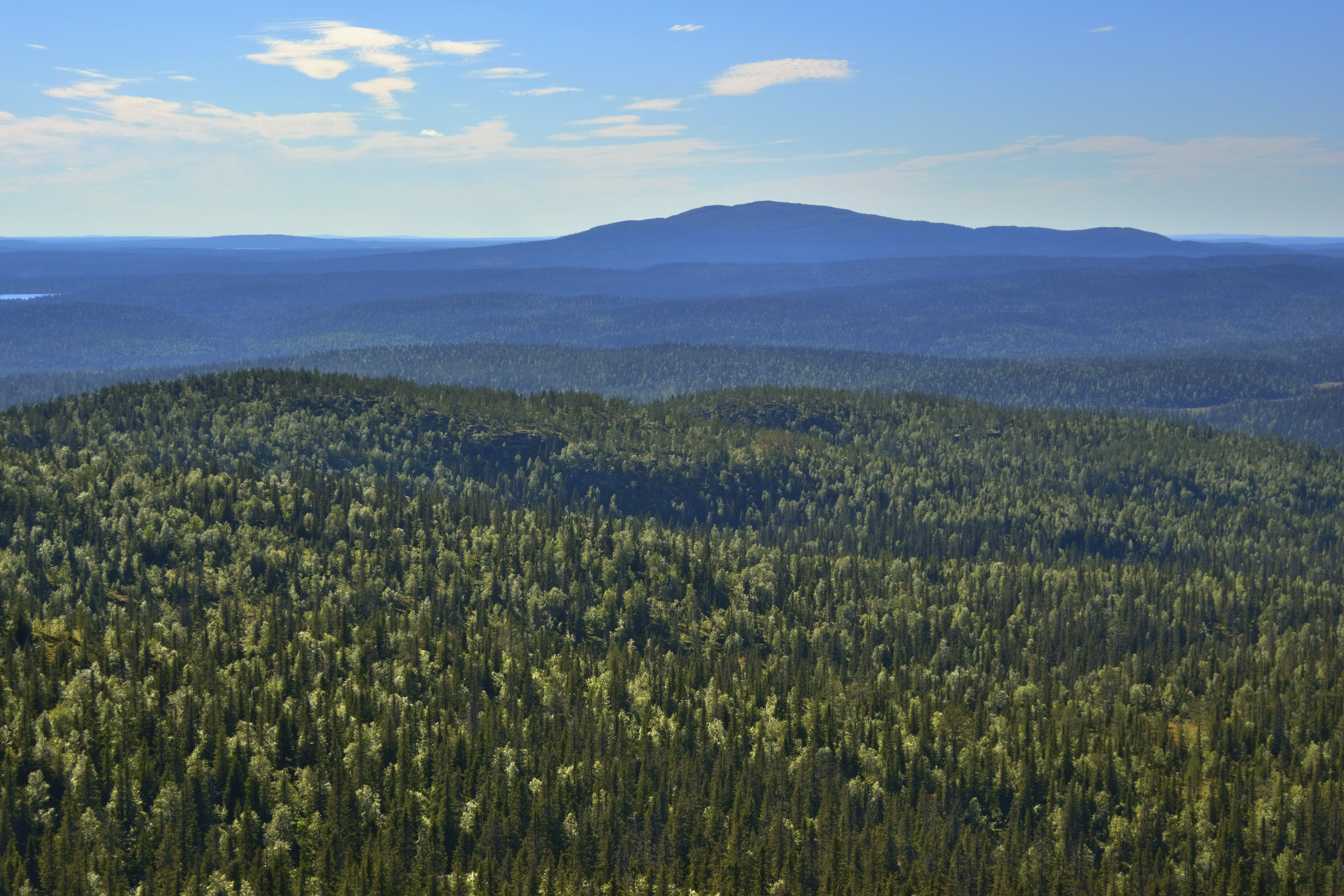
View of Nuorunen, the highest point of Karelia, in Paanajärvi National Park

Russian Karelia is a regular destination for international tourism due to its unique architectural, cultural and historical sites such as Kizhi and Valaam. The region is visited by tourists in both summer and winter when possible activities include riding in a sled behind a dog team and running from the banya to an ice hole and back. Summer hikers can visit the Kivach waterfall or the Demon's Chair plateau.

In South Karelia, Lappeenranta is a popular destination for Russian tourists, with 1.5 million visiting annually. Imatrankoski in Imatra has been a tourist attraction since the late 18th century, when the Empress of Russia Catherine the Great visited the site in 1772.

Koli National Park in North Karelia began receiving tourists when Karelianism became a major trend. Koli was a source of inspiration for numerous painters and composers such as Jean Sibelius, Juhani Aho and Eero Järnefelt, who in turn contributed to Karelianism through their work. Koli gained national park status in 1991.

== See also ==
- Asbestos-ceramic, a type of pottery made in Karelia and the vicinity
- History of Finland
- Karelianism, cultural movement in the Grand Duchy of Finland
- Karelia Suite, a collection of pieces by the composer Jean Sibelius
- Lauri Törni, born in Viipuri, a soldier during the Continuation War
- Karelian pony, horse breed native to Karelia
