= Cortinarius oulankaensis =

Scientific classification
- Kingdom: Fungi
- Division: Basidiomycota
- Class: Agaricomycetes
- Order: Agaricales
- Family: Cortinariaceae
- Genus: Cortinarius
- Species: C. oulankaensis

Binomial name
- Cortinarius oulankaensis Kytöv., Niskanen, Liimat. & H.Lindstr. (2013)

Species of mushroom-forming fungus

Cortinarius oulankaensis is an agaric fungus in the family Cortinariaceae, first described in 2013. The fungus features a grey-brown to dark brown cap measuring 4–10 centimetres across, pale grey-brown gills that darken with maturity, and a club-shaped stipe with whitish fibres that turn brown over time. It grows in late September in coniferous forests on lime-rich soils primarily in northern Europe, particularly in Finland's Oulanka National Park and near Steinkjer, Norway, though environmental DNA evidence suggests it may also occur in British Columbia, Canada.

== Taxonomy ==
Cortinarius oulankaënsis was formally described in 2013 after combined morphological and DNA (ITS + rpb2) analyses showed it to be distinct from related brown Cortinarius species. The species epithet honours its type locality in Oulanka National Park, Kuusamo, Finland. The holotype (Niskanen et al. 05‑169) was collected on 19 September 2005 in a spruce (Picea abies)‑dominated, base‑rich woodland; material is preserved at the herbarium of the University of Helsinki (H).

== Description ==
The cap (pileus) measures 4–10 cm across, beginning hemispherical before flattening into a broad dome often marked by a shallow central bump (umbo). Its surface is clothed in fine, whitish fibres (fibrillose) when young and appears grey‑brown with pale whitish fibrils at the margin; it becomes uniformly dark brown and then fades to yellowish brown as it dries (hygrophanous). The gills are medium‑spaced to rather distant, with a slight notch where they meet the stipe (emarginate); initially pale grey‑brown, they deepen to dark brown with maturity. The stipe is 5.5–10 cm tall and 0.9–1.3 cm thick at the apex (1.5–2.5 cm at the base), nearly cylindrical to club‑shaped, and initially covered in whitish fibres that soon turn brown. Remnants of the universal veil form a thin, greyish sheath low on the stipe. The flesh is pale grey‑brown above, turning chocolate brown at the base; it bears no distinctive odour.

Under the microscope, the spores measure 9.3–11.1 by 6.1–6.8 μm (on average 9.9–10.6 by 6.3–6.6 μm) and are narrowly ellipsoid to slightly almond‑shaped (amygdaloid). They are densely ornamented with coarse warts (verrucose) and stain reddish‑brown in Melzer's reagent (a dextrinoid reaction, indicating a particular spore‑wall chemistry). The gill tissue is made up of smooth to finely roughened hyphae, while the cap cuticle (pileipellis) consists of thin‑walled hyphae bearing zebra‑striped pigment encrustations. A layer of slightly larger cells (hypoderm) lies beneath, and clamp connections (bridge‑like hyphal structures) occur throughout.

== Habitat and distribution ==
This species fruits in late September in mesic to moist coniferous forests on calcareous (lime‑rich) soils, typically under spruce with occasional pine and birch. Although it can be locally abundant—especially in Oulanka National Park (Finland) and near Steinkjer (Norway)—it is rare overall and confined to the hemiboreal and boreal vegetation zones of northern Europe. An environmental DNA sequence matching C. oulankaënsis has also been recovered from ectomycorrhizal roots in British Columbia, Canada, suggesting a wider—but as yet poorly documented—distribution. In the 2019 Finnish red list, C. oulankaensis is considered a vulnerable species, unchanged from its 2010 classification.

== See also ==
- List of Cortinarius species
