= Saariselkä (urban area) =

Urban area in Lapland, Finland

Coordinates: 68°25′17″N 27°25′02″E

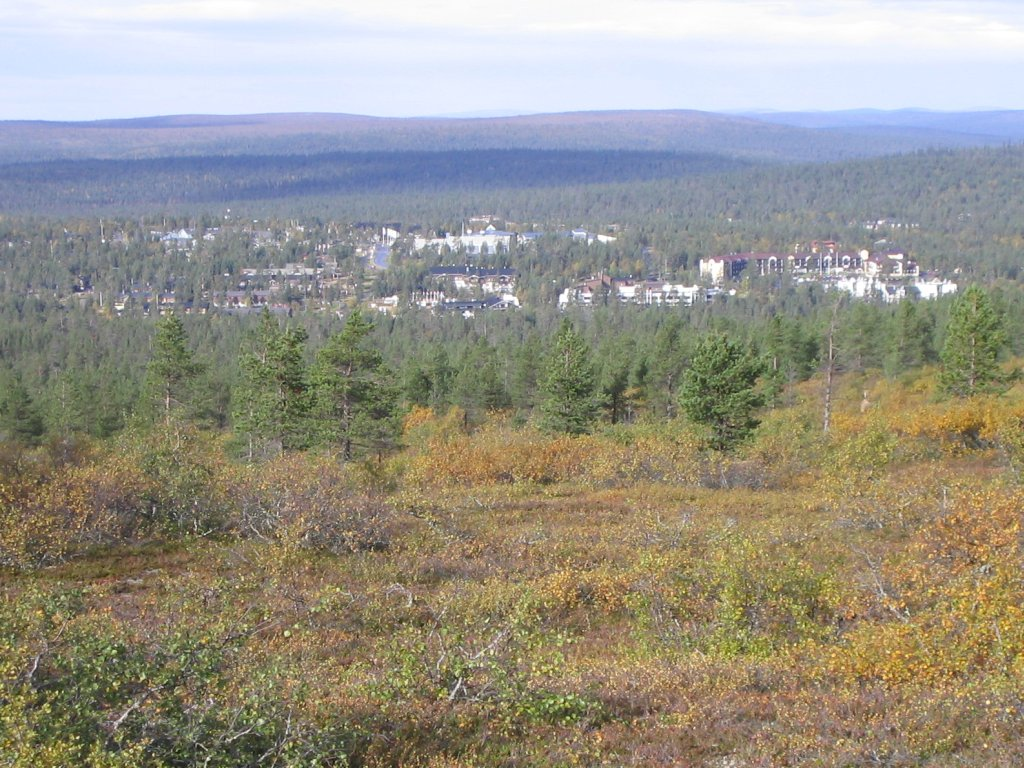
Saariselkä village

Saariselkä (Northern Sami: Suoločielgi, Inari Sami: Suáluičielgi) is an urban area in Inari municipality, Lapland, Finland. It is located near the western end of the Saariselkä mountain ridge, which it also is named after.

The development of Saariselkä began in the 1960s and the area was zoned by the municipality in the 1970s. The nearby Urho Kekkonen National Park was established in 1983.

As of 31 December 2023, the urban area had a population of 348, a surface area of 2.30 square kilometers (0.89 sq mi) and a population density of 151.3 inhabitants per square kilometer (392/sq mi). The population is increased by seasonal workers in the winter, who are not counted as residents of the urban area.

== Tourism ==
Saariselkä is known as a tourist destination, with ski tourism in the winter and wilderness and nature tourism in the summer and autumn. The area has several hotels, restaurants and shopping centers. Saariselkä attracts ski tourists from Sweden, Norway and native Finland. Saariselkä's slalom slopes are located in the mountains of Kaunispää and Iisakkipää, just east of the town. There are also around 200 kilometers of groomed cross country ski tracks.

== Chapel ==
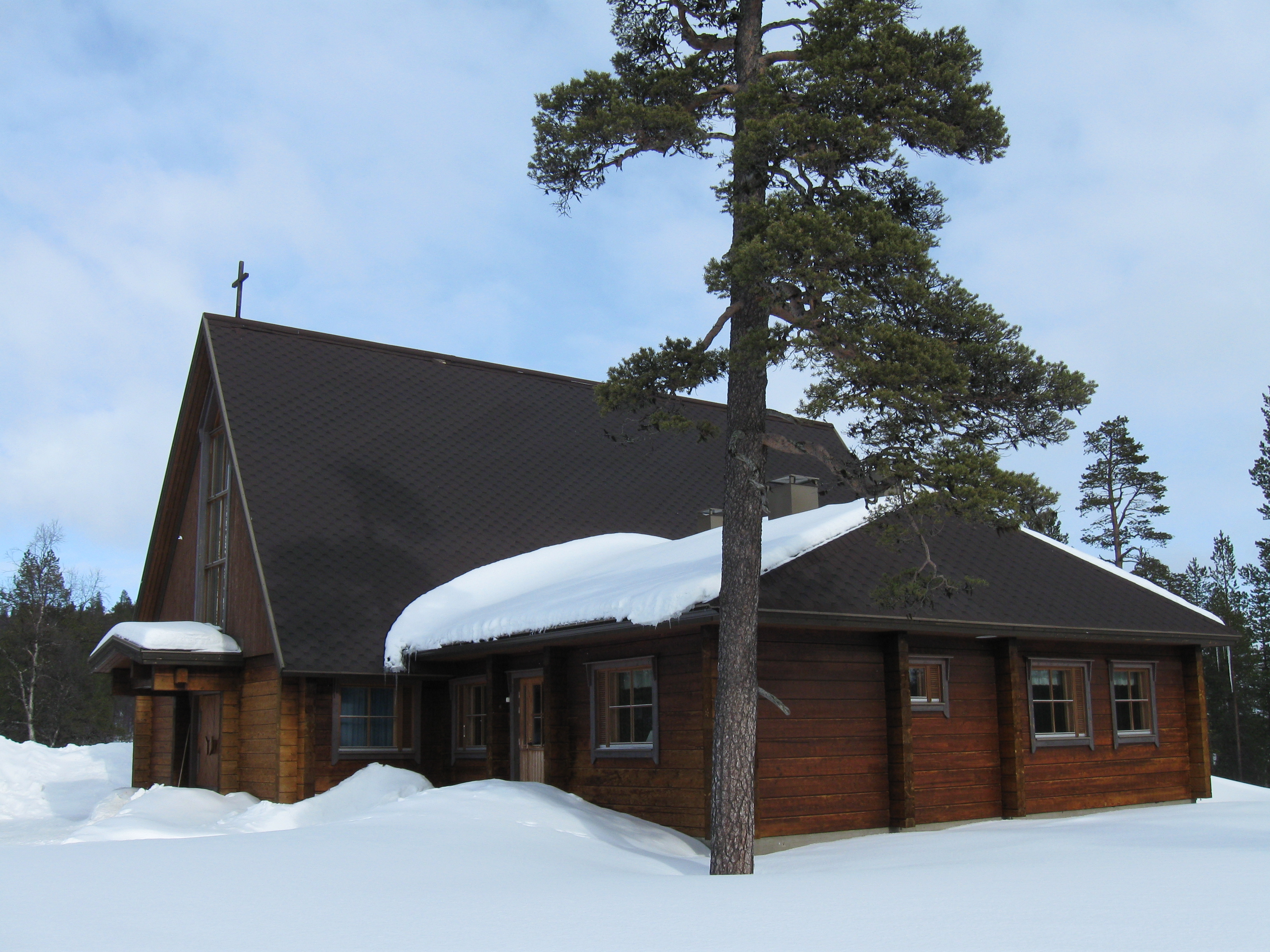
Saariselkä chapel

There is an ecumenical chapel in Saariselkä owned by the Evangelical Lutheran parish of Inari. The 350-square-meter (3,800 sq ft) chapel was designed by Erkki Jokiniemi and has room for 300 people. It was finished in 1996 and consecrated by Bishop of Oulu Olavi Rimpiläinen and Metropolitan Leo of Oulu.
