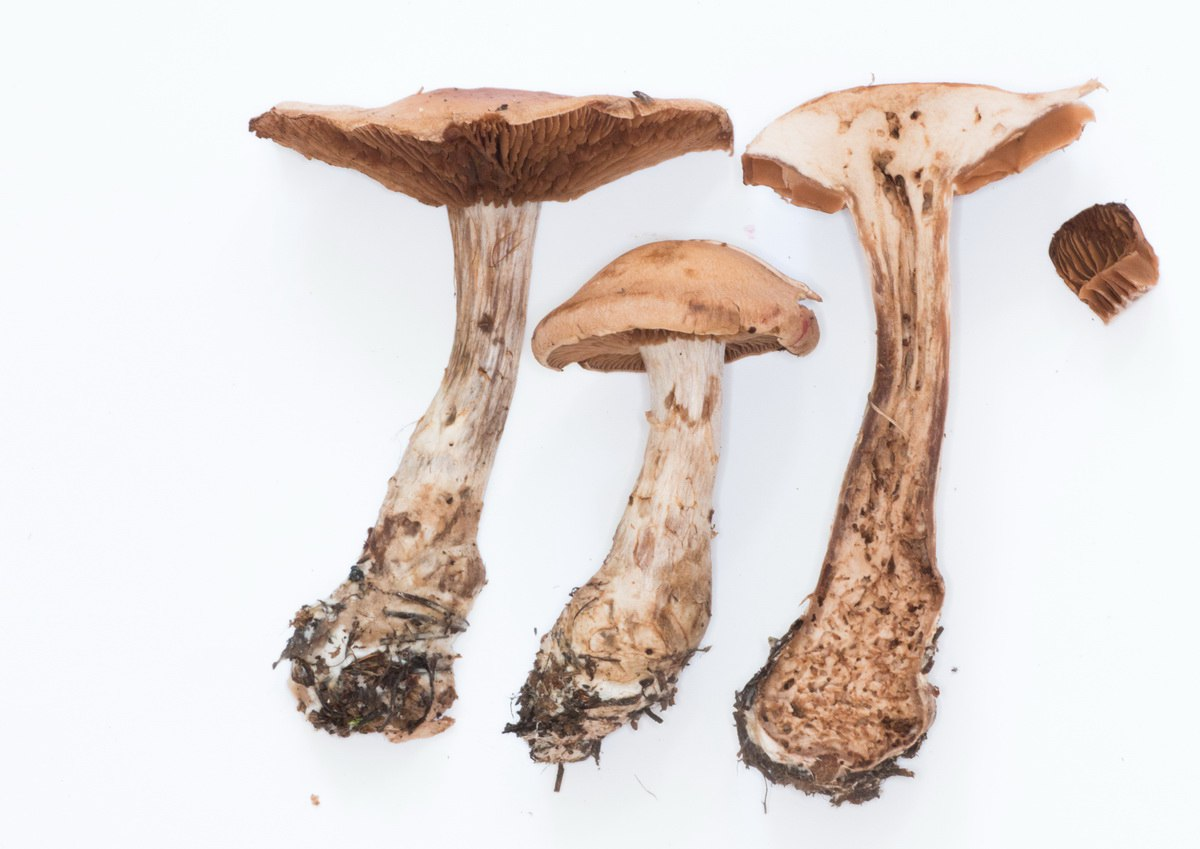

Scientific classification
- Kingdom: Fungi
- Division: Basidiomycota
- Class: Agaricomycetes
- Order: Agaricales
- Family: Cortinariaceae
- Genus: Cortinarius
- Species: C. fuscobovinus

Binomial name
- Cortinarius fuscobovinus Kytöv., Niskanen & Liimat. (2013)

= Cortinarius fuscobovinus =

Species of mushroom-forming fungus

Cortinarius fuscobovinus is an uncommon agaric fungus in the large family Cortinariaceae. that was formally described in 2013. It features a greyish-yellow-brown to dark brown cap measuring 5–10 centimetres in diameter, pale brown gills that mature to chocolate brown, and a whitish stipe that quickly turns brown with age. The species fruits from mid-August to mid-September in mature coniferous forests on lime-rich soils throughout northern Europe's boreal zone, primarily in well-preserved natural woodlands and protected reserves, where it is classified as near-threatened in Finland.

== Taxonomy ==
This species was described in 2013 following detailed study of morphology and DNA sequences (ITS + rpb2) by Ilkka Kytövuori and colleagues. The species epithet fuscobovinus alludes to its resemblance to Cortinarius bovinus combined with its uniformly brown specimens when dried and stored as specimina exsiccata (Latin) in herbaria. The holotype (Kytövuori 07‑877) was collected 27 August 2007 in Oulanka National Park, Kuusamo, Finland, from a spruce (Picea abies) forest on calcareous (lime‑rich) soil; it is deposited in the herbarium of the University of Helsinki.

== Description ==
The cap (pileus) of C. fuscobovinus measures 5–10 cm in diameter. When young it is hemispherical with the margin turned inward; as it matures it flattens to a low dome, occasionally bearing a small central bump (umbo). The surface is innately fibrillose (covered in fine fibres) and ranges from greyish‑yellow‑brown to dark brown, sometimes showing blackish patches; in drying, it becomes streaked with paler, yellowish‑brown zones (hygrophanous). Beneath, the gills are moderately spaced and notched where they meet the stipe (emarginate); they shift from pale brown to chocolate brown, with edges remaining slightly paler. The stipe stands 4–11 cm tall, initially clothed in whitish fibrils that soon brown, and may bear a faint girdle or sheath from the universal veil.

The flesh is uniformly brown, deepening to nearly black at the stipe base in older specimens, and emits only a faint radish‑like odour (raphanoid). Microscopically, the almond‑ to ovoid‑shaped spores measure 9.1–11.1 by 6.1–7.0 μm (average 9.4–10.8 by 6.3–6.7 μm) and are densely ornamented with fine warts (verrucose); they stain reddish‑brown in Melzer's reagent (a dextrinoid reaction), reflecting a specific chemical property of the spore wall. The gill tissue (trama) comprises smooth, pale olivaceous hyphae, while the gill edge bears moderately large, mostly globe‑shaped cells (marginal cells). The cap cuticle (pileipellis) is an epicutis of thin‑walled, mostly smooth hyphae, underlain by a distinct hypoderm layer; clamp connections (hook‑like bridges between hyphal cells) occur throughout the tissues.

== Habitat and distribution ==
Cortinarius fuscobovinus fruits from mid‑August to mid‑September in mature, mesic coniferous forests dominated by spruce (Picea abies) often with pine (Pinus sylvestris), on base‑rich, calcareous soils. It appears most frequently in well‑preserved natural woodlands—many records come from protected reserves—and is confined to the boreal vegetation zone of northern Europe, where it remains uncommon. In the 2019 Finnish red list, C. fuscobovinus is considered a near-threatened species, unchanged from its previous (2010) classification.

== See also ==
- List of Cortinarius species
