= Maanselkä =

Hills in Finland and Russia

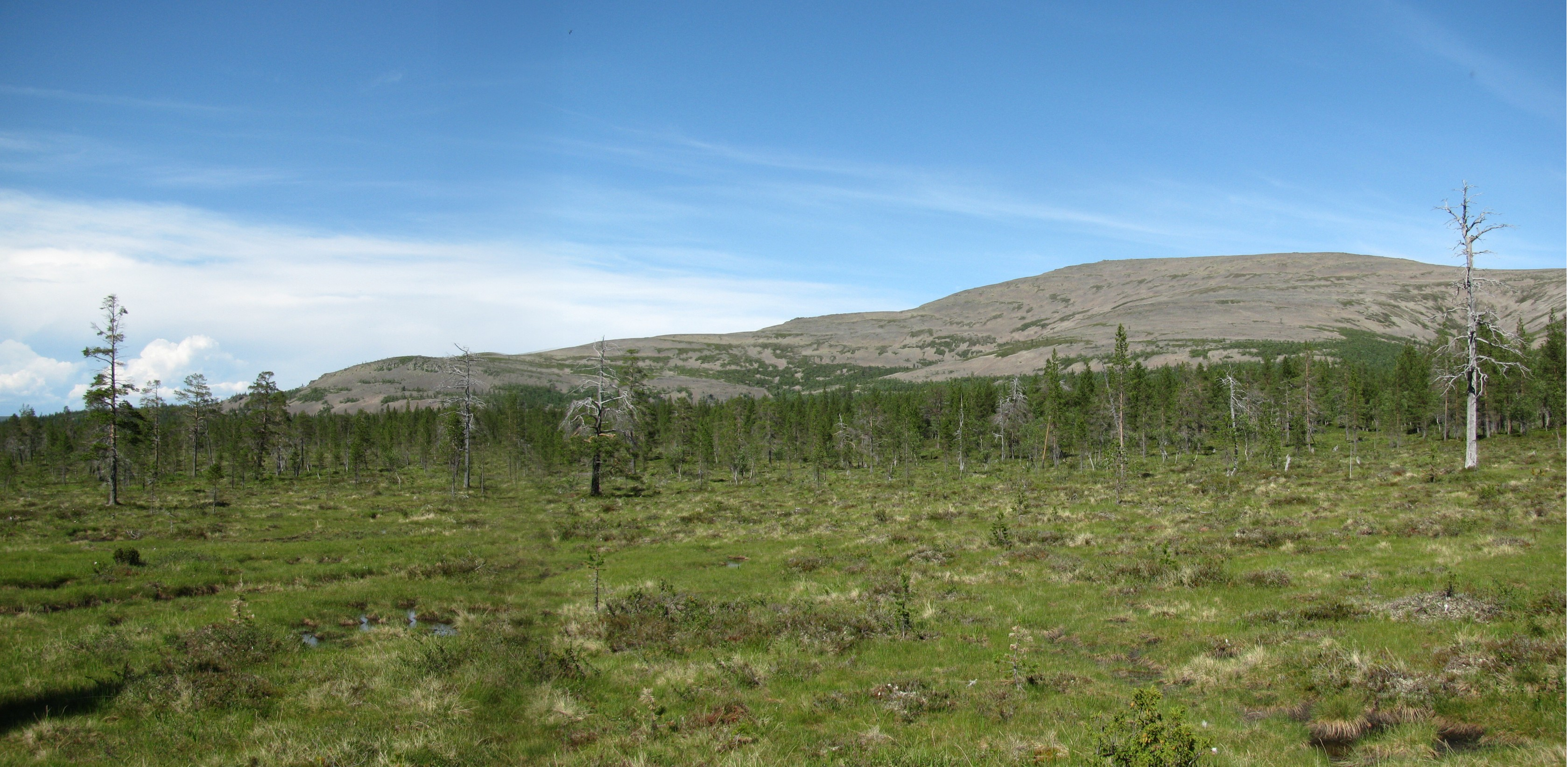
- Sokosti viewed from southwest

Highest point
- Peak: Sokosti fell
- Elevation: 718 m (2,356 ft)

Dimensions
- Length: 750 km (470 mi) NNW/SSE
- Width: 75 km (47 mi) WSW/ENE

Geography
- Location within European Russia Location within Finland
- Location: Lapland, North Ostrobothnia (Finland); Murmansk Oblast, Republic of Karelia (Russia)
- Range coordinates: 67°40′N 29°30′E
- Parent range: East European Plain

Climbing
- Easiest route: From Alakurtti or Kemijarvi

Maanselkä (Finnish: Maanselkä; Russian: Маанселькя, romanized: Maanselkya) is a hilly region in Finland and Russia that forms a watershed between the Baltic Sea and the Arctic Ocean. It is located at the northern end of the East European Plain, around the Arctic Circle.

The Urho Kekkonen National Park, Oulanka National Park and Paanajärvi National Park are protected areas partly located in the Maanselkä hills. The main economic activities of the area are skiing, forestry, reindeer herding, hunting, as well as fishing in the lakes and rivers.

== Geography ==
Maanselkä is an extensive chain of smooth hills forming a watershed that separates the rivers flowing into the Baltic Sea from those flowing into the Arctic Ocean. It is located in northeastern Finland, in the eastern parts of North Ostrobothnia and Lapland, by the Russian border. In Russia the southern part of the range is in Karelia and the northern in Murmansk Oblast. To the northwest the drainage divide extends further into northern Norway.

The hills are low and rounded. The highest point is Sokosti, a 718 meters (2,356 ft) high summit in Saariselkä, on the Finnish side. The highest point of Karelia, the 576 meters (1,890 ft) high Nuorunen, is located in the Russian side of the hill region. There are many lakes in the intermontane basins, as well as rivers with poorly drained valleys and swampy forests. The highest elevations are treeless and barren, with some mountain tundra vegetation.

Geologically Maanselkä is part of the central zone of the Baltic Shield. There are numerous traces of the erosional activity of ancient glaciers across the hills, such as lateral moraines and outwash plains.

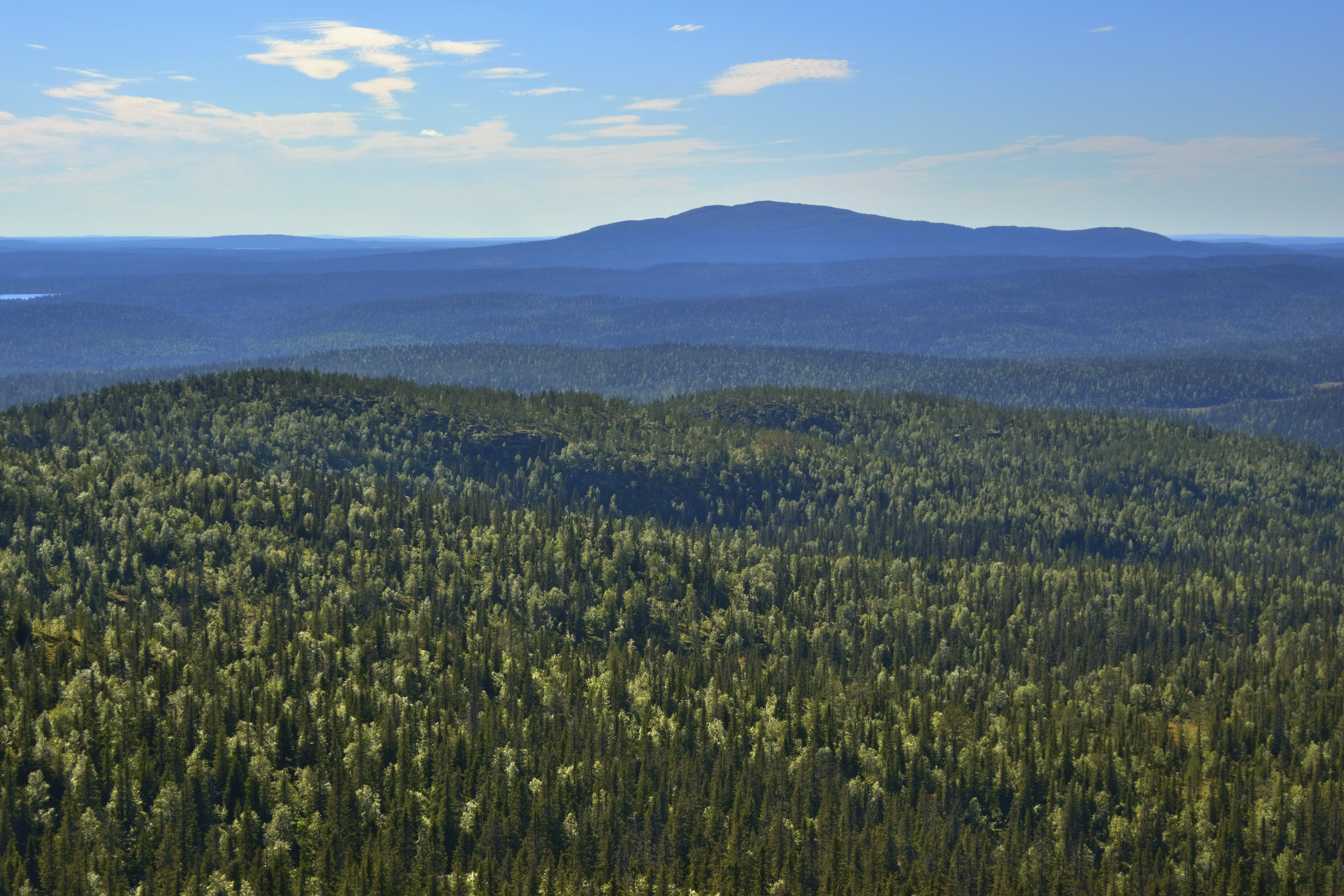
View of Nuorunen, the highest point of Karelia.

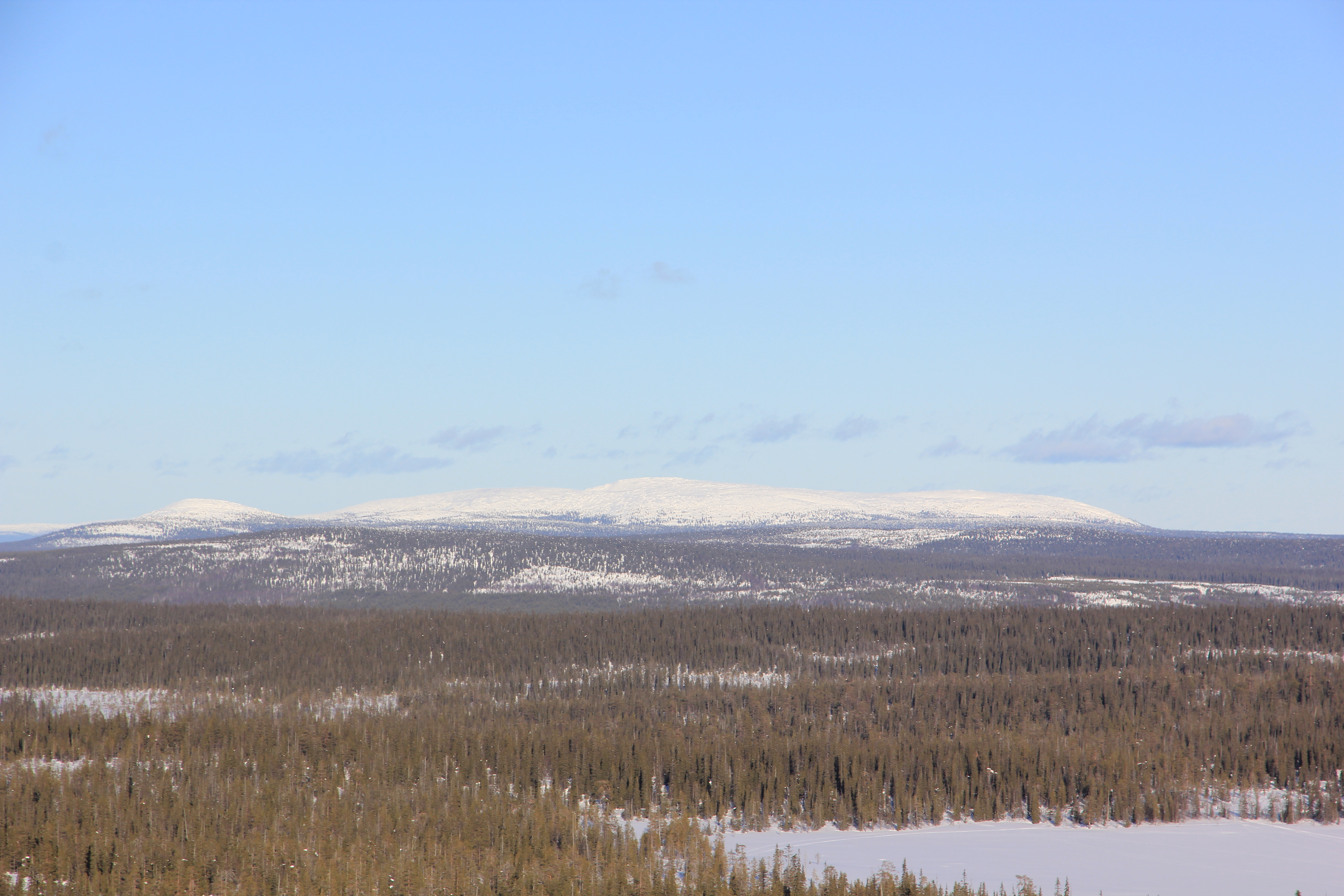
Sallatunturi panorama, Kandalakshsky District.

== See also ==
- Highest points of Russian Federal subjects
- List of mountains and hills of Russia
