= Saariselkä =

Hilly area in Finnish Lapland

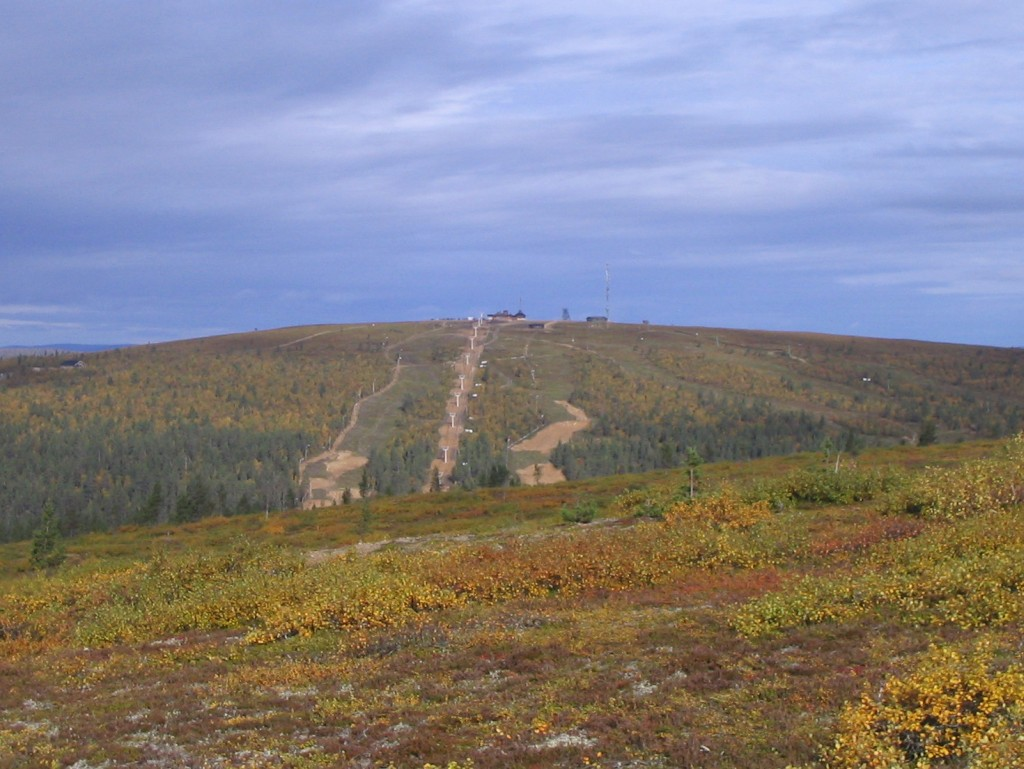
- Kaunispää ski resort

Highest point
- Peak: Mount Sokosti
- Elevation: 718 m (2,356 ft)

Naming
- Native name: Suolluščielgi (Inari Sami); Suoločielgi (Northern Sami)

Geography
- Location within Finland
- Location: Lapland (Finland)
- Range coordinates: 68°15′N 28°10′E
- Parent range: Maanselkä

Climbing
- Easiest route: From Saariselkä village

Saariselkä (Inari Sami: Suáluiščielgi; Northern Sami: Suoločielgi; lit. 'island-ridge') is a fell area in Lapland, northern Finland. It is located in the Inari, Savukoski and Sodankylä municipalities. The highest point is 718 meters (2,356 ft) high Mt Sokosti. The range is mostly two-billion-year-old granulite. The last ice age ended 9500 years ago in Saariselkä.

== Tourism ==
Saariselkä is partly in Urho Kekkonen National Park. The hill area is a popular tourist destination, providing activities such as skiing, hiking and spa. Saariselkä village is located in the area and belongs to the Inari municipality, about 300 meters (980 ft) above sea level. Kaunispää-fell, rising next to the village, is 438 meters (1,437 ft) high.

Many couples want to have a "white wedding" in Lapland in the winter when there is snow everywhere. A couple may come to the chapel in a sledge pulled by husky dogs or reindeer. Pyhän Olavin Kappeli (St. Olaf's Chapel) and a small wooden Tievakappeli (Tieva Chapel) near Hotel & Igloo Village Kakslauttanen in Saariselkä have been popular places for white weddings. Other possible venues include reindeer farms.

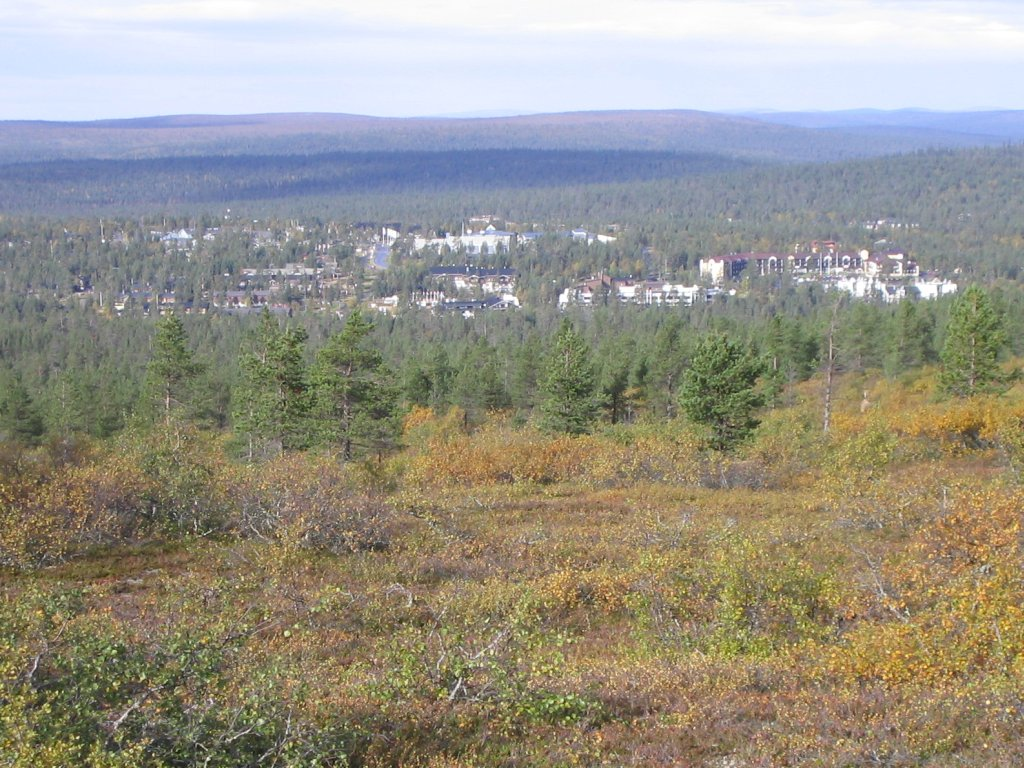
Saariselkä village

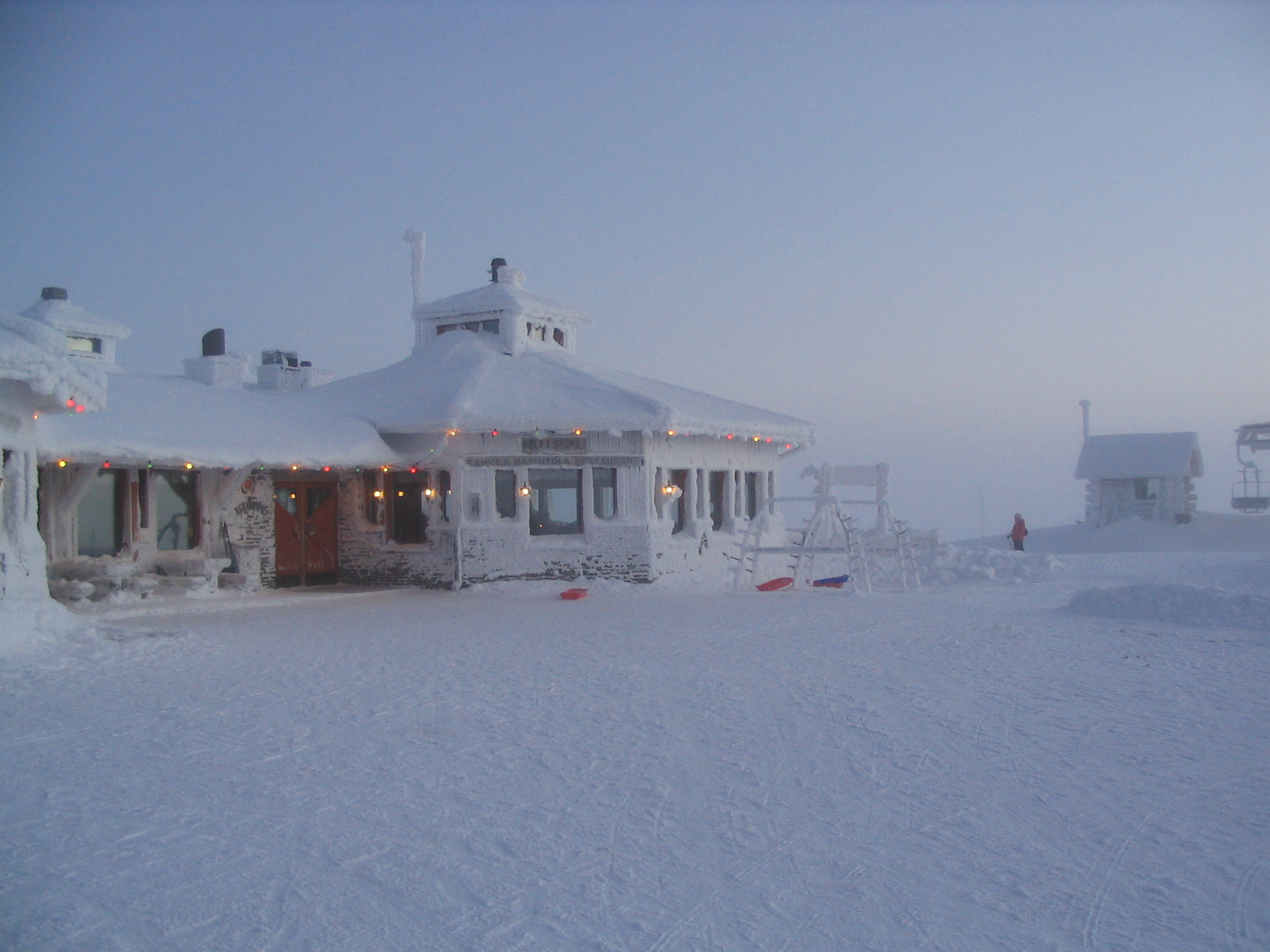
Restaurant at the top of Kaunispää-fell, 438 meters above sea level

== Climate ==
Saariselkä has a subarctic climate (Dfc) with short, cool summers and long, cold winters.

Climate data for Inari Saariselkä matkailukeskus (1991–2020 normals, extremes 1980– present)
Month	Jan	Feb	Mar	Apr	May	Jun	Jul	Aug	Sep	Oct	Nov	Dec	Year
Record high °C (°F)	4.2 (39.6)	4.7 (40.5)	9.1 (48.4)	15.4 (59.7)	27.0 (80.6)	28.9 (84.0)	30.2 (86.4)	29.7 (85.5)	21.4 (70.5)	12.1 (53.8)	9.9 (49.8)	5.0 (41.0)	30.2 (86.4)
Mean maximum °C (°F)	−0.1 (31.8)	0.3 (32.5)	3.9 (39.0)	9.4 (48.9)	18.3 (64.9)	23.8 (74.8)	25.4 (77.7)	23.3 (73.9)	16.5 (61.7)	8.6 (47.5)	2.3 (36.1)	1.1 (34.0)	26.8 (80.2)
Mean daily maximum °C (°F)	−8.3 (17.1)	−8.2 (17.2)	−3.2 (26.2)	2.2 (36.0)	8.1 (46.6)	14.6 (58.3)	18.0 (64.4)	15.3 (59.5)	9.4 (48.9)	1.5 (34.7)	−3.8 (25.2)	−6.3 (20.7)	3.3 (37.9)
Daily mean °C (°F)	−12.1 (10.2)	−12.0 (10.4)	−7.7 (18.1)	−2.1 (28.2)	3.7 (38.7)	9.7 (49.5)	13.1 (55.6)	10.8 (51.4)	5.8 (42.4)	−1.2 (29.8)	−6.7 (19.9)	−9.7 (14.5)	−0.7 (30.7)
Mean daily minimum °C (°F)	−15.6 (3.9)	−15.3 (4.5)	−11.7 (10.9)	−6.0 (21.2)	−0.1 (31.8)	5.4 (41.7)	9.0 (48.2)	7.0 (44.6)	2.5 (36.5)	−3.6 (25.5)	−9.5 (14.9)	−13.0 (8.6)	−4.2 (24.4)
Mean minimum °C (°F)	−28.2 (−18.8)	−27.1 (−16.8)	−22.4 (−8.3)	−16.6 (2.1)	−7.2 (19.0)	−0.8 (30.6)	2.4 (36.3)	−0.6 (30.9)	−4.5 (23.9)	−14.3 (6.3)	−20.9 (−5.6)	−25.0 (−13.0)	−30.1 (−22.2)
Record low °C (°F)	−38.6 (−37.5)	−36.9 (−34.4)	−29.7 (−21.5)	−25.8 (−14.4)	−15.3 (4.5)	−3.9 (25.0)	−1.5 (29.3)	−4.2 (24.4)	−11.5 (11.3)	−21.1 (−6.0)	−28.8 (−19.8)	−32.6 (−26.7)	−38.6 (−37.5)
Average precipitation mm (inches)	37 (1.5)	32 (1.3)	32 (1.3)	38 (1.5)	45 (1.8)	68 (2.7)	80 (3.1)	73 (2.9)	59 (2.3)	56 (2.2)	40 (1.6)	38 (1.5)	597 (23.5)
Average precipitation days (≥ 1.0 mm)	11	9	8	9	10	11	12	12	10	12	10	10	124
Source 1: FMI climatological normals for Finland 1991-2020
Source 2: Record highs and lows 1980- present

== Magnetic hill ==
Part of the former Finnish Highway 4 in Saariselkä is known nowadays as Magnetic hill. During World War II the road from Rovaniemi to Petsamo (Arctic Ocean's Highway) was extremely important to the Finns. Petsamo and its harbour was the only open way to the ocean. The hills beside Kaunispää-fjeld are so steep that 1940's trucks could not easily climb them. Folks thought there was some magnetic force in the hill that squeezed all the power out of the motors. After a realignment of Highway 4 that short section was taken out of daily use. It has been declared the "Magnetic Hill Road Museum".
