= PAN Parks =

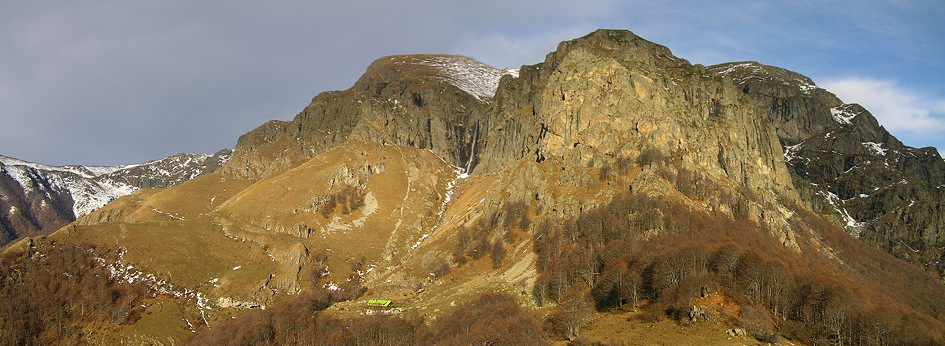
The Central Balkan National Park, Bulgaria

The PAN Parks Foundation was a non-governmental organisation that aimed to protect Europe's wildernesses. The foundation filed for bankruptcy in May 2014 in The Netherlands, but was denied the status by the court and is currently in liquidation.

== Details ==
The PAN Parks Foundation was founded in 1998 by the World Wide Fund for Nature and the Dutch travel company Molecaten, with the aim of creating national parks in Europe, along the model of the Yellowstone and Yosemite National Parks in North America. The organisation aims to create a network of European wilderness areas where wilderness and high quality tourism facilities are balanced with environmental protection and sustainable local development. It attempts to achieve this through a process of auditing and verification, enabling it to certify parks owned by partners as meeting particular standards, combined with political advocacy on the local and European level.

== List of PAN Certified parks ==
1. Central Balkan National Park, Bulgaria
2. Fulufjället National Park, Sweden
3. Majella National Park, Italy
4. Oulanka National Park, Finland
5. Paanajärvi National Park, Russia
6. Retezat National Park, Romania
7. Rila National Park, Bulgaria
8. Borjomi-Kharagauli National Park, Georgia
9. Southwestern Archipelago National Park, Finland
10. Peneda-Gerês National Park, Portugal
11. Soomaa National Park, Estonia
12. Dzūkija National Park, Lithuania
13. Čepkēliai Reserve, Lithuania
14. Küre Mountains National Park, Turkey
