= Paanajärvi National Park =

National park in Karelia, Russia

Coordinates: 66.2842°N 30.1397°E

- IUCN category II (national park)
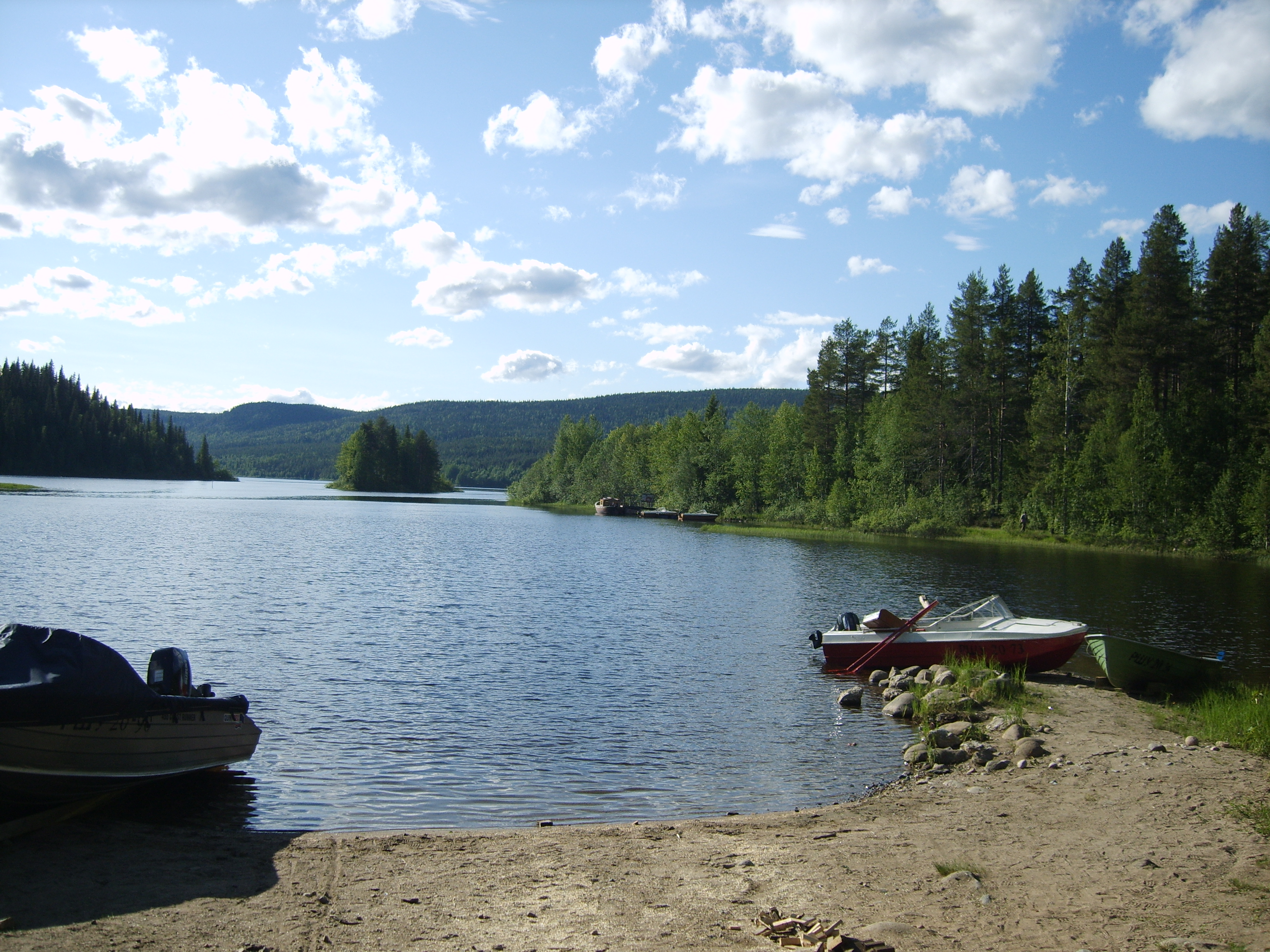
- Lake and forests in Paanajärvi National Park
- Interactive map of Paanajärvi National Park
- Location: Republic of Karelia, Russia
- Area: 1,043.71 km^{2} (402.98 sq mi)
- Established: 1992
- Website: http://parks.karelia.ru/paanajarvi/ http://oopt.info/paana/index.html

Paanajärvi National Park is a Russian national park in the Loukhsky District of northwestern Republic of Karelia, in northwestern Russia.

The park was established in 1992. It has received a PAN Parks certificate.

== Geography ==
Paanajärvi National Park is located in the Maanselkä hills of Karelia Region, along the Finnish–Russian border, northern Europe.

It protects 1,043.71 square kilometres (402.98 sq mi) of pristine Scandinavian and Russian Taiga ecoregion forest habitats, lakes, and rivers. Nuorunen, the highest point of Karelia, is located in the park area.

=== Oulanka National Park ===
Oulanka National Park is adjacent on the west along the border, within Finland, with contiguous protection of this Karelian Taiga habitat.

== See also ==
- National parks of Russia
- National parks of Finland
- Taiga and boreal forests
