= National Museum of the Republic of Karelia =

Museum in Petrozavodsk, Karelia, Russia

- Национальный музей Республики Карелия
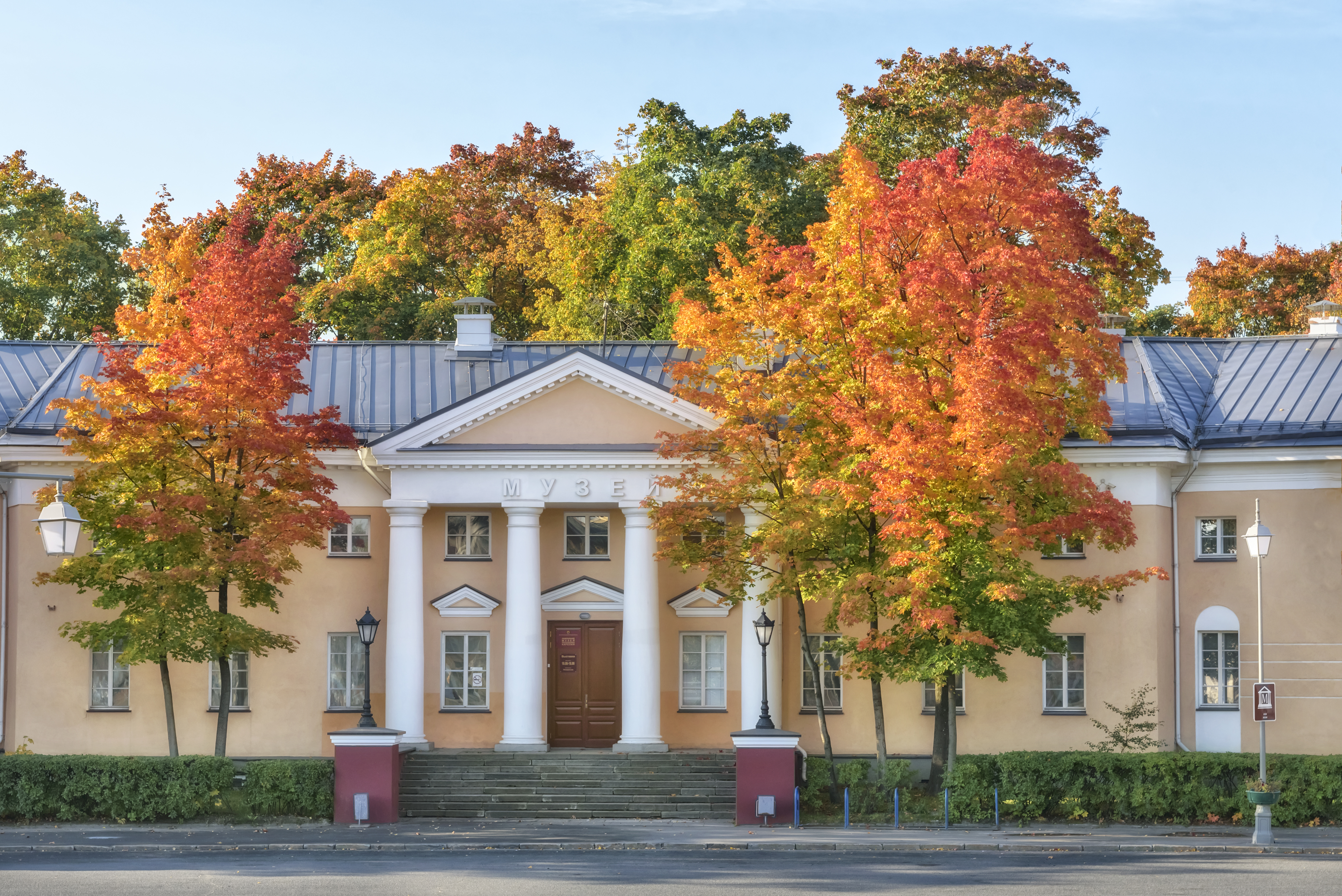
- Established: 1871 (original building); 1993 (current building)
- Location: Petrozavodsk, Karelia, Russia
- Coordinates: 61°47′13.5″N 34°21′49.3″E
- Type: museum
- Collection size: 120,000

The National Museum of the Republic of Karelia (Russian: Национальный музей Республики Карелия) is a museum in Petrozavodsk, Republic of Karelia, Russia.

== History ==
The museum was originally established in 1871. In 1993, the museum relocated to its current building of the historical architectural group.

== Exhibitions ==
The museum currently holds around 120,000 artifacts. Collections range from goods from Western Europe to the Russian Empire.

== Activities ==
The museum regularly organizes various activities, such as kids educational activities, museum holidays, museum and culture studies for universities etc.

== See also ==
- List of museums in Russia
