= Nuorunen =

Mountain in the Republic of Karelia, Russia

- Нуорунен
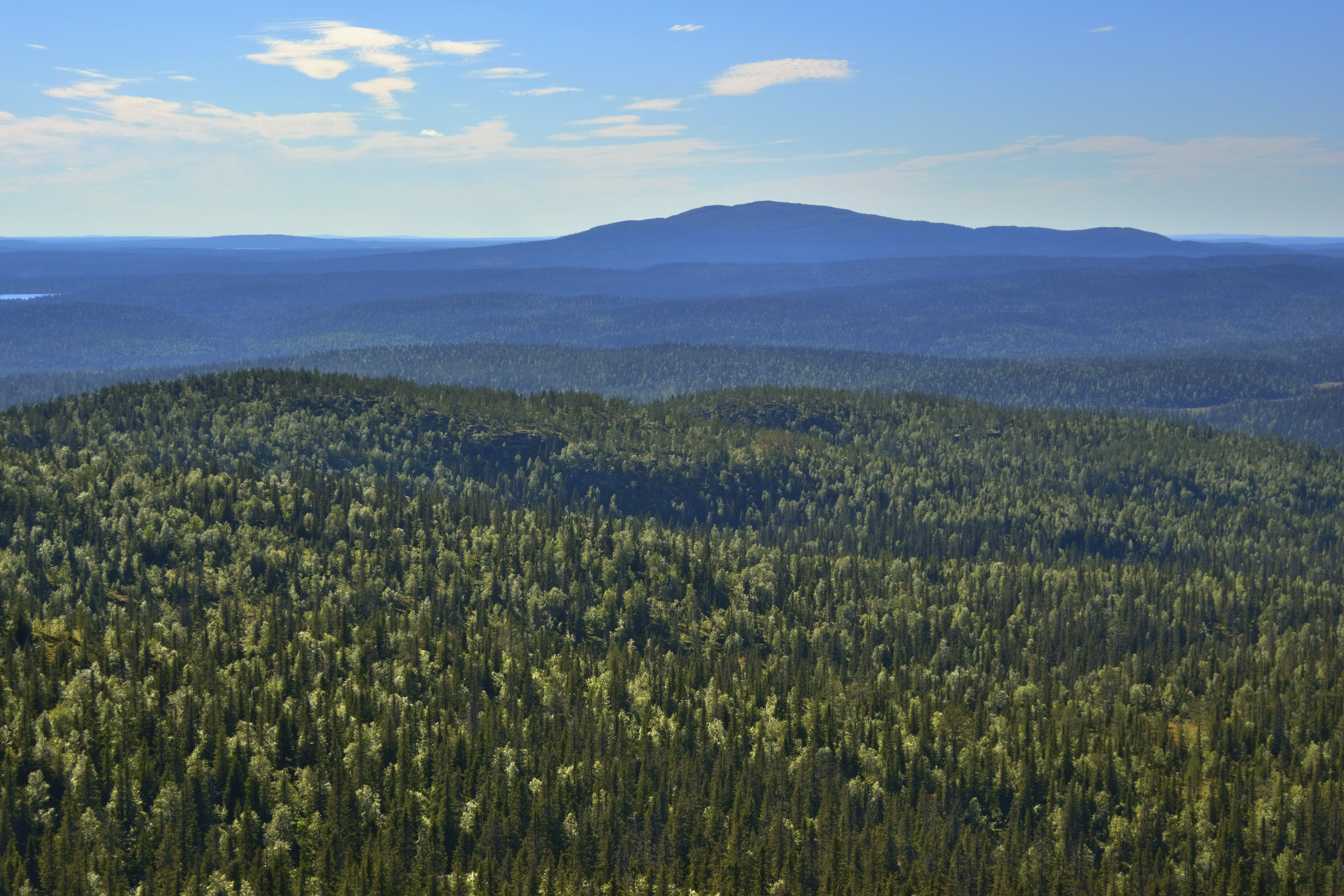
- View of the mountain on a clear day

Highest point
- Elevation: 577 m (1,893 ft)
- Prominence: 329 m (1,079 ft)
- Coordinates: 66°08′41″N 30°14′41″E

Geography
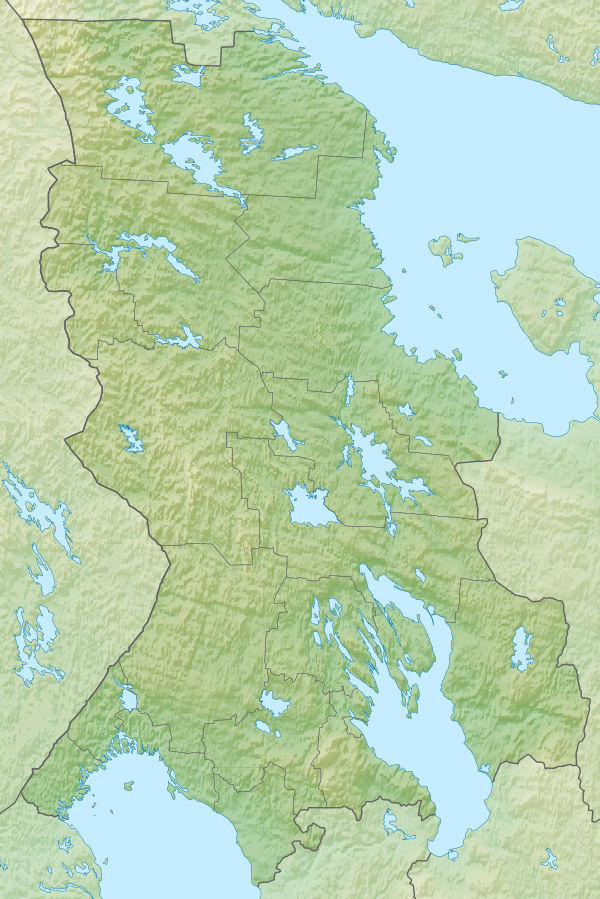
- Location within Karelia
- Location: Loukhsky District; Republic of Karelia, Russia
- Parent range: Maanselkä

Climbing
- Easiest route: From the Paanajärvi National Park

Nuorunen (Russian: Нуорунен) is a peak in the Republic of Karelia, Russia. It is the highest point of the Federal Subject.

The peak is located in the Paanajärvi National Park, a 1,045 square kilometres (403 sq mi) protected area.

== Description ==
Nuorunen is a 576.7 metres (1,892 ft) high mountain located just south of the Arctic Circle in the Russian part of the Maanselkä range. The mountain rises in the northwestern sector of the Loukhsky District, east of the Finnish border. The top of the mountain is barren, offering a clear panorama of the surrounding area. There is a very large boulder on the top, allegedly a sieidi.

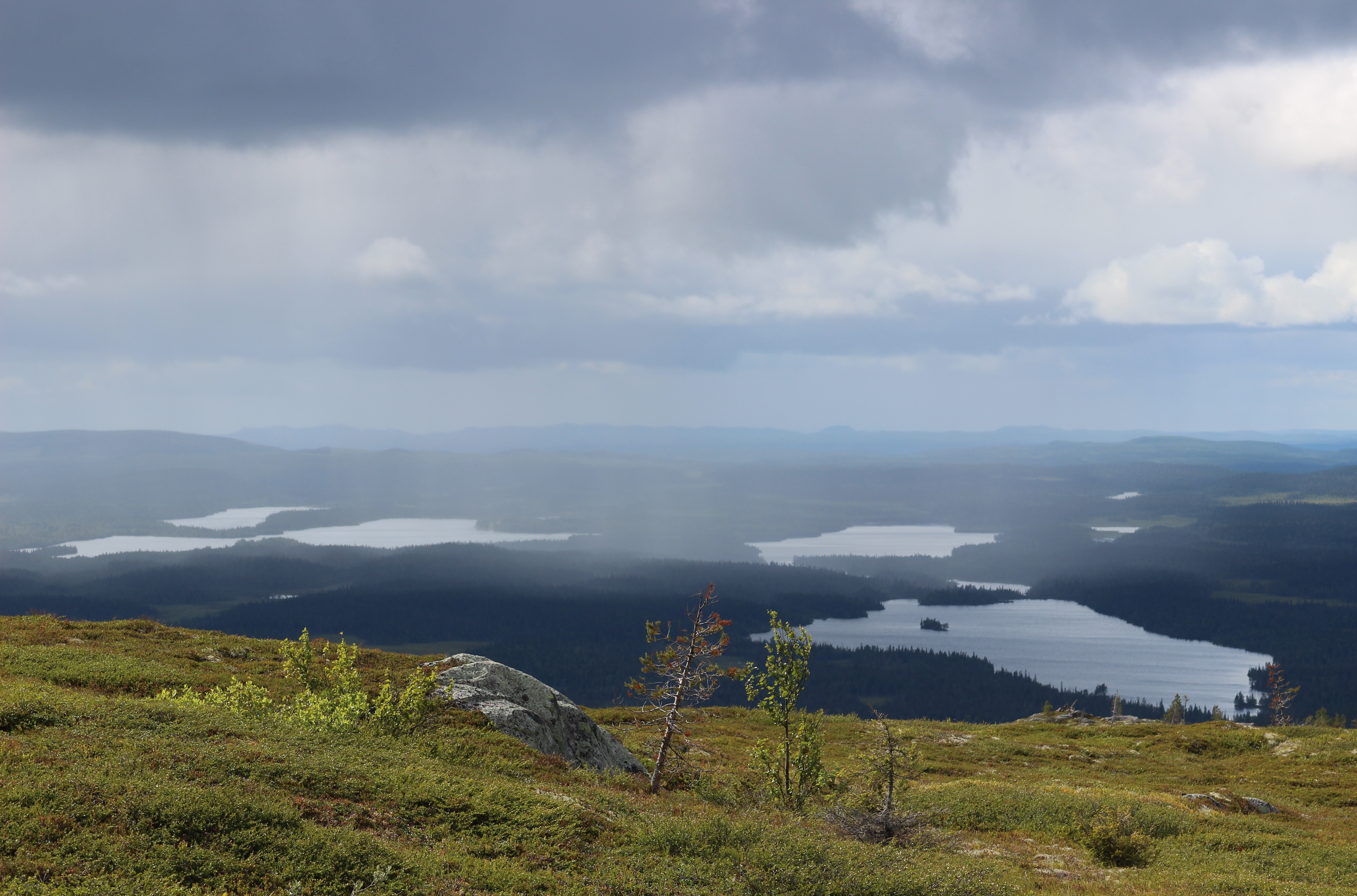
View from the summit.

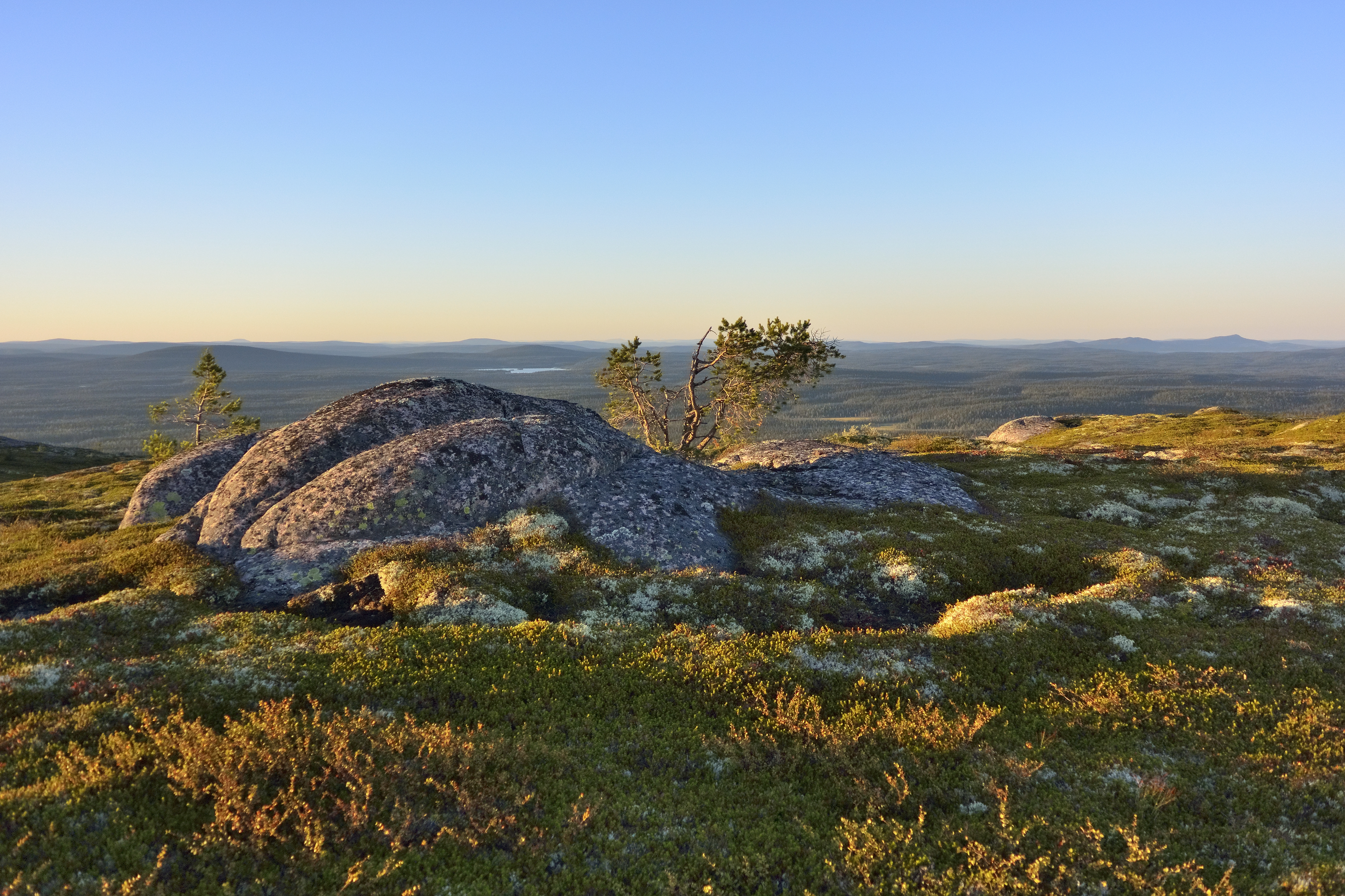
Sieidi at the mountaintop.

== See also ==
- List of highest points of Russian federal subjects
- List of mountains and hills of Russia
