= Urho Kekkonen National Park =

National park in Lapland, Finland

- IUCN category II (national park)
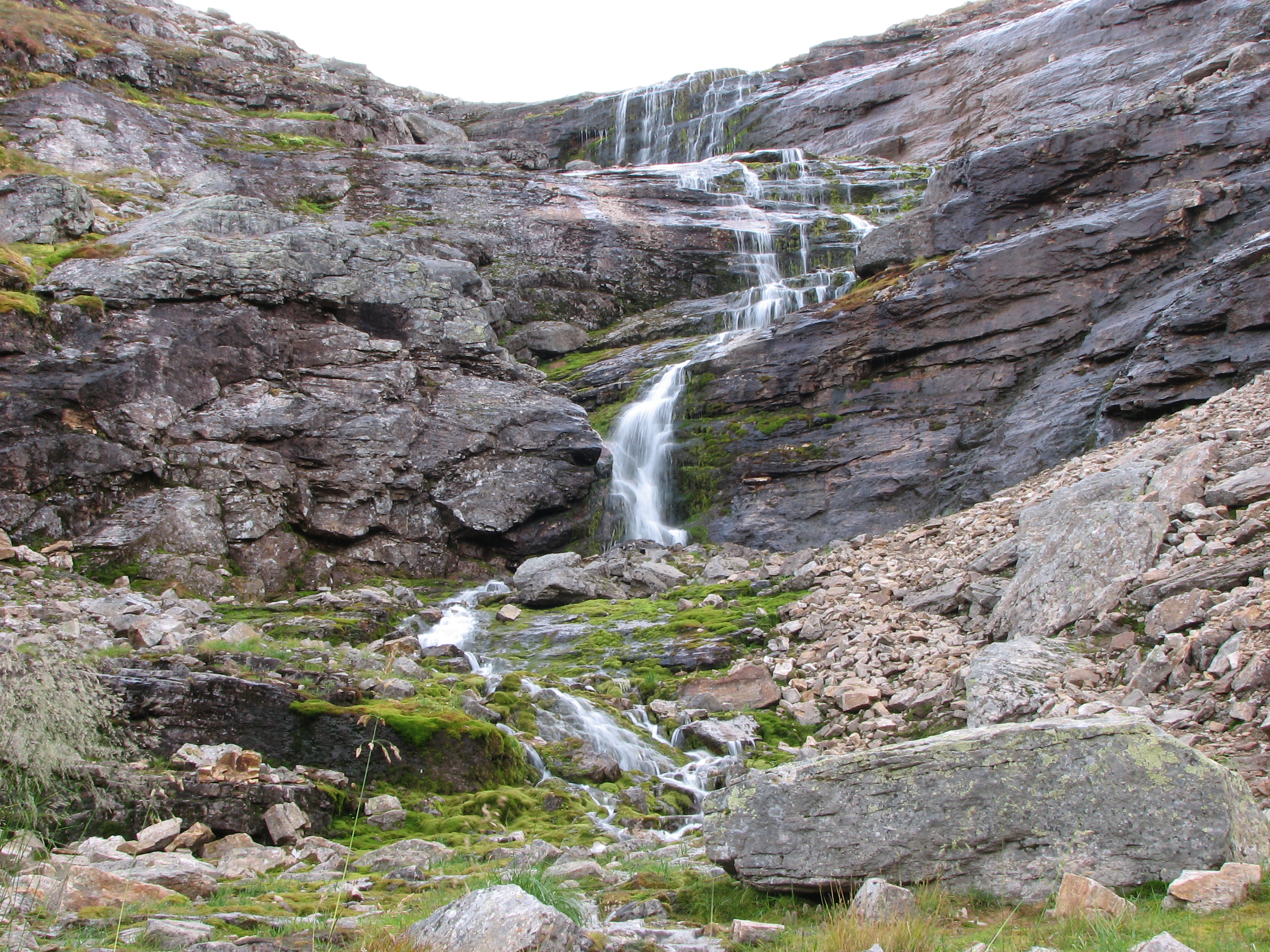
- The waterfall in Paratiisikuru (valley), in Urho Kekkonen National Park

- Location within Finland
- Location: Lapland, Finland
- Coordinates: 68°20′N 028°00′E
- Area: 2,550 km^{2} (980 sq mi)
- Established: 1983
- Visitors: 435,900 (in 2024)
- Governing body: Metsähallitus
- Website: https://www.luontoon.fi/en/destinations/urho-kekkonen-national-park

Urho Kekkonen National Park (Finnish: Urho Kekkosen kansallispuisto, Northern Sami: Urho Kekkonen álbmotmeahcci, abbreviated to UK) is a national park in Lapland, Finland, situated in area of municipalities of Savukoski, Sodankylä and Inari. Established in 1983 and covering 2,550 square kilometres (985 sq mi), it is one of Finland's largest protected areas. It is named after Urho Kekkonen, late President and Prime Minister of Finland.

The Suomujoki river flows through the northern parts of the diverse park. The marked paths in its western part are an easy destination even for the inexperienced backpacker, whereas the wilderness is good for long and demanding trips.

Most trips to Urho Kekkonen National Park are started from the Kiilopää fell center, the Aittajärvi lake along the Suomujoki river, or Raja-Jooseppi, and backpackers usually end up nearby the Saariselkä fell line, for instance on the top of its highest fell, Sokosti. Reindeer herding is still a common livelihood in the area.

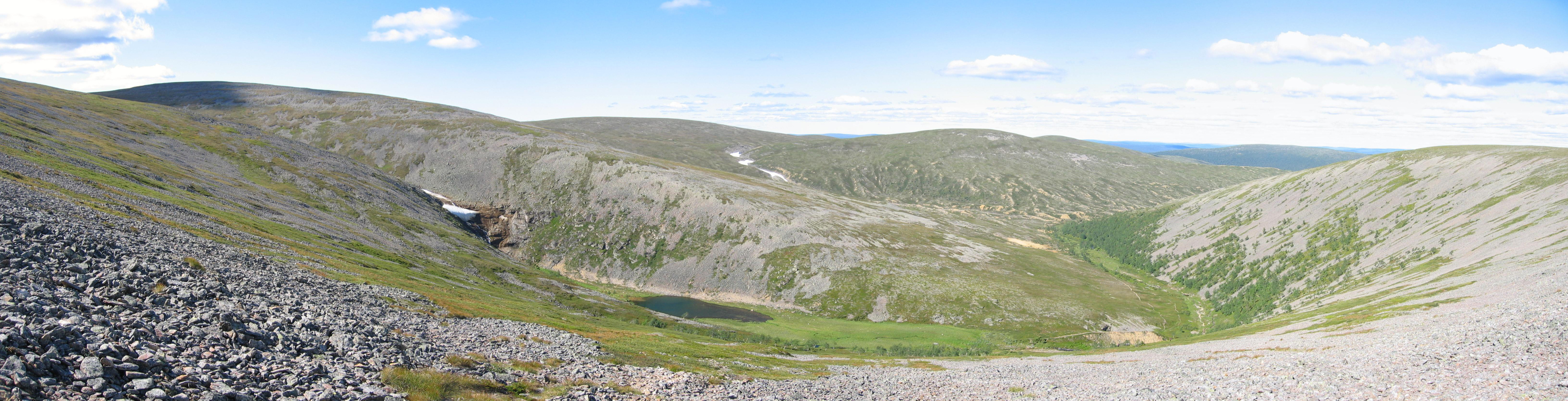
Paratiisikuru valley in the middle of the Saariselkä fell line, seen from the top of Ukselmapää fell

== Gallery ==
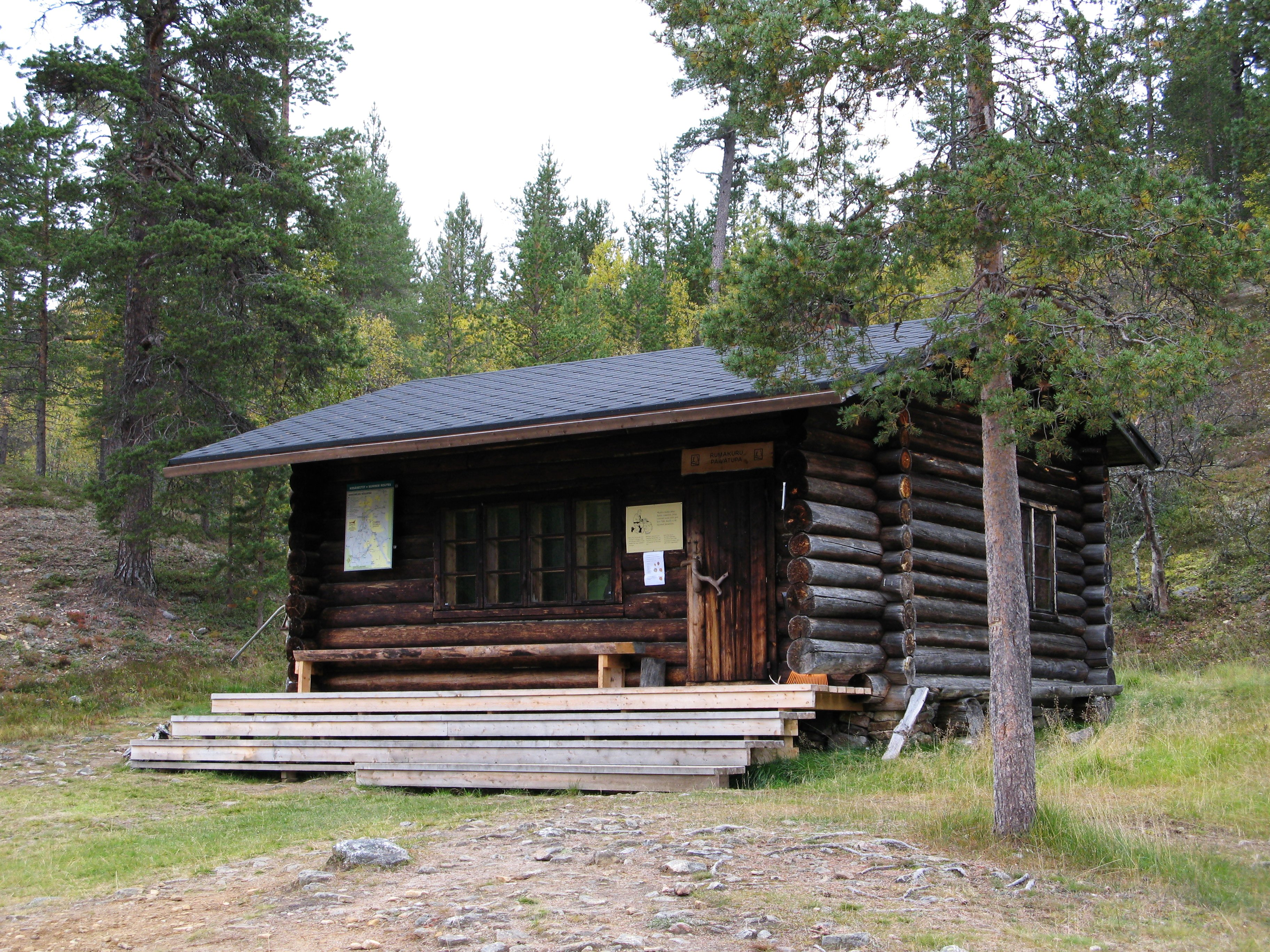
A wilderness hut in UK national park

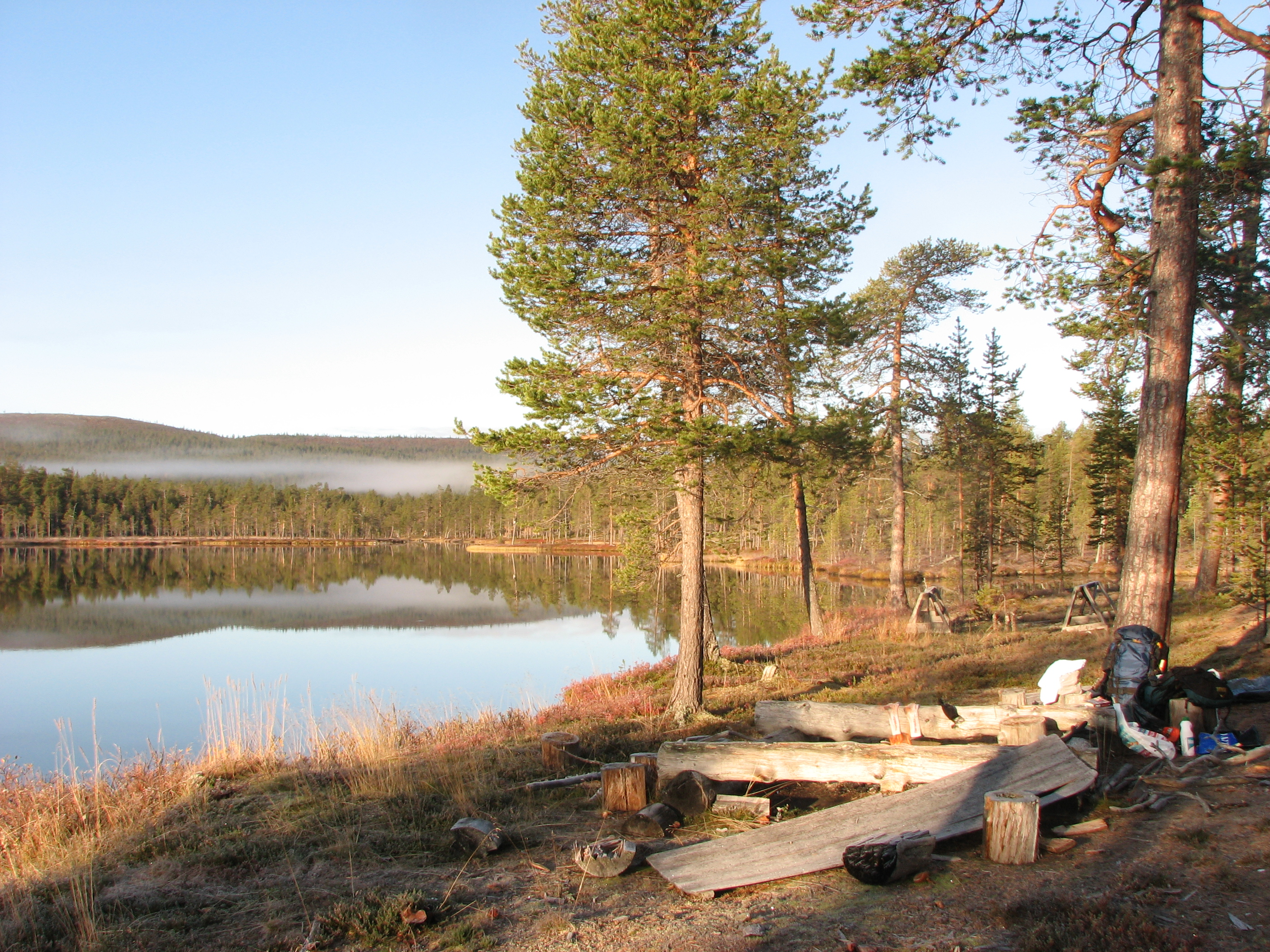
Lake Harrijärvi

== See also ==
- List of national parks of Finland
- Protected areas of Finland
- Maanselkä
