= Oulanka National Park =

National park in Finland

- IUCN category II (national park)
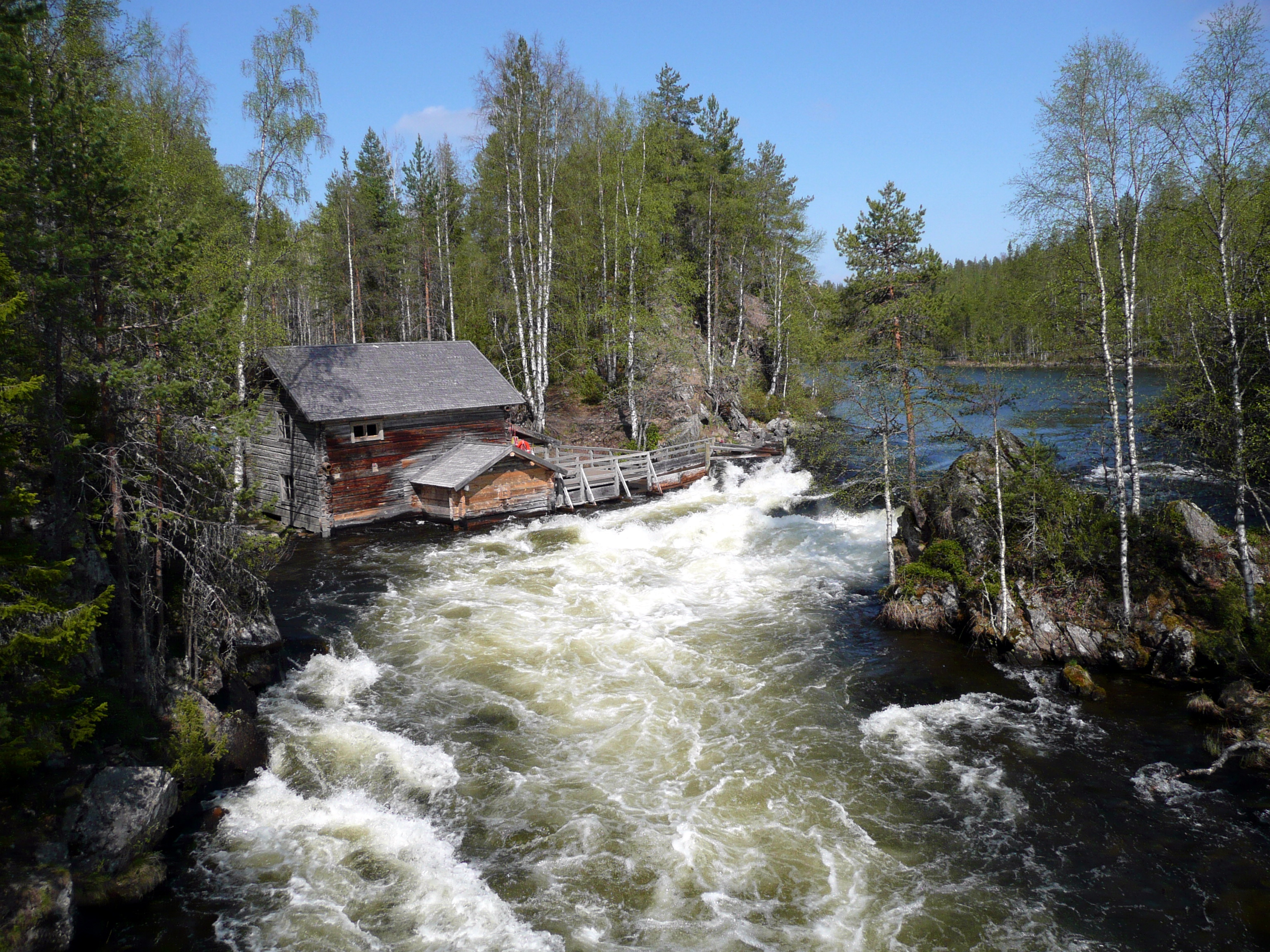

- Location within Finland
- Location: Finland
- Coordinates: 66°22′32″N 29°20′19″E
- Area: 270 km^{2} (100 sq mi)
- Established: 1956
- Visitors: 187,400 (in 2024)
- Governing body: Metsähallitus
- Website: https://www.luontoon.fi/en/destinations/oulanka-national-park

Oulanka National Park (Finnish: Oulangan kansallispuisto) is a national park in the Northern Ostrobothnia and Lapland regions of Finland, covering 270 square kilometres (104 sq mi). It borders the Paanajärvi National Park in Russia. The park was established in 1956 and was expanded in 1982 and 1989.

== History ==
The first inhabitants in the area were Sámi people from Lapland. They lived there until the end of the 17th century, when Finnish settlers arrived.

From the 1930s, the Finnish Tourist Association kept boats on the river and renovated the wooden cabins found across the park for accommodation purposes. These cabins can be used free of charge by any hikers in the area, given that they follow some basic guidelines and rules regarding the state of the cabins, the wood supply, and protecting the surrounding nature.

From 2002, Oulanka was the first of two Finnish national parks to become part of World Wide Fund for Nature's PAN Parks, with the other being the Southwestern Archipelago National Park.

Although hunting and fishing, and later farming, were the primary occupation of people in the area, the most notable activity in modern-day Oulanka is tourism.

== Nature ==
Oulanka National Park is a combination of northern, southern, and eastern nature. In the north, there are vast mires. It has a unique river ecosystem, with rapids and river valleys with sandy banks. Made up of pine forests, the landscape is an example of untouched and unlogged boreal forest, close to the Arctic Circle, which is protected by World Wide Fund for Nature from intensive reindeer herding. Near the visitor center is the Oulanka Research Center, which is part of the Thule Institute and was established in 1966 to facilitate research in biological and geological sciences.

Along with the rugged geography and the varied microclimates, area is rich in animal and plant species, including endangered species and more than 500 vascular plant species. There is an overlap between northern and southern species in terms of their distribution, and numerous species in the east of Finland have their westernmost outposts there. Oulanka has a nutrient-rich soil, which makes it ideal for the rare and demanding flora that is found there. The Oulanka River Valley was a very important dispersal route for various species coming from eastern Finland after the last ice age. In late summer, the park has many bilberries and mushrooms, and wild orchids are one of the most popular flowers in the area. The lichen species Verrucaria oulankajokiensis, described in 2024, was originally collected from the park, where it grows on rocks on the shores of the River Oulankajoki.

Riverbeds and alluvial meadows are home to rare species of butterflies, there are more than a hundred different bird species in the park. Most meadows are managed in a traditional manner, and reindeer herding is allowed only for people from Lapland. In the park there are also rare birds such as the Siberian jay and capercaillies, which are fond of the herb-rich forests in the park. Endangered species such as bear, lynx and wolverine also live in Oulanka, along with moose and other game.

== Hiking ==
Oulanka is one of the most popular national parks in Finland. The most well-known Finnish trekking route, Karhunkierros (80 km), is located in the national park, and is accessible all year round. Other routes include the Pieni Karhunkierros Trail (12 km), Keroharju Hiking Trail (17 km) and other smaller nature trails such as the Rytisuo Nature Trail (5 km), Hiidenlampi Nature Trail (5 km), and the Kiutaköngäs Day-trip Trail (8 km). There are various camping areas, designated fireplaces, wooden cabins and boats which are available to the public. There are also some winter trails, which include the Rytisuo Snowshoeing Trail (7.5 km) or the Oulanka Wilderness Trail, from Juuma to Kiutaköngäs (26 km) which can be also explored with skis, snowshoes or even snowmobiles. Other activities include canoeing or cycling through some routes. Visitors are allowed to pick berries and mushrooms, but are not allowed to hunt game or fish without a license.

== See also ==
- List of national parks of Finland
- Protected areas of Finland
- PAN Parks
- Maanselkä
