= Irja =

Irja is a given name. Notable people with the given name include:

- Irja Aav (1944–1995), Estonian actress
- Irja Askola (born 1952), Finnish bishop in the Evangelical Lutheran Church of Finland
- Irja Agnes Browallius (1901–1968), Swedish teacher, novelist and short story writer
- Irja Hagfors (1905–1988), Finnish dance artist, choreographer and dance teacher
- Irja Ketonen (1921–1988), Finnish media executive
- Irja Koikson (born 1980), Estonian footballer
- Irja Lipasti (1905–2000), Finnish sprinter
- Irja Seurujärvi-Kari (born 1947), Finnish Sámi politician and academic

== See also ==
- Papua (province)
