= 2023 Finnish Sámi parliamentary election =

← 2019	4 September – 2 October 2023	2024 →

All 21 members (Note: As well as four deputy members) to the Sámi Parliament of Finland
- Registered: 6,060
- Turnout: 51.63%

The 2023 Finnish Sámi parliamentary election took place between 4 September and 2 October 2023 to elect 21 members and four deputy members to the Sámi Parliament of Finland.

On 27 March 2024, the Supreme Administrative Court of Finland ruled that the election had been conducted unlawfully due to the exclusion of 72 individuals from the electoral register, despite their eligibility as determined by prior court rulings. The election results were invalidated and a rerun was ordered to be held later in 2024.

== Overview ==
=== Electoral system ===
Unlike elections to the Sámi Parliament of Norway, elections to the Sámi Parliament of Finland are non-partisan. Candidates are nominated by voter associations of at least three Sámis who are eligible to vote under the Sámi electoral roll.

The four municipalities of the Sámi Domicile Area elect three members (as well as one deputy member) each: Enontekiö, Utsjoki, Inari and a portion of Sodankylä. The remaining nine members and three deputies are elected among the candidates who received the highest share of the votes, regardless of which municipality they live in or whether they live outside the Sámi homeland.

=== Procedure ===
Elections to the Sámi Parliament are administered over a four-week period, beginning on the Monday of the first full week of September. Voting concludes on 2 October 2023.

==== Voter eligibility and registration ====
Under Section 3 of the Act on the Sámi Parliament, a person is eligible to register for the Sámi electoral roll if they identify as Sámi and:

- They, or one of their parents or grandparents was native Sámi speaker, or
- They are descended from a person in the mountain, forest, or fisher Lapp Sámi register, or
- At least one of their parents are, was, or could have been, eligible to vote in the elections to the Sámi Parliament of 1995 or the Sámi Council of 1973.

Any Sámi wishing to participate in the election had to apply to be entered in to the electoral roll by 31 December 2022 at 4 p.m. local time (EEST).

== Campaign ==
The election comes at a time of tense relations between the Sámi community and the government of Finland. Reforms to the Sámi Parliament Act, which would enshrine the right of the Sámi to self-determination and amend the Sámi heritage requirements for voting in Sámi Parliament elections, had been under consideration for several years but failed to come to fruition. The most recent attempt to reform the act was shot down by the Parliament of Finland's Constitutional Law Committee on 24 February 2023.

=== Candidates ===
The final list of candidates was announced at a meeting of the Sámi Assembly Election Board on 9 August. A total of 34 candidates were approved to run in the elections:

Candidate	Home town
Palonoja Armi Tuulikki	Sodankylä
Nuorgam Mirva Anne Marjatta	Utsjoki
Ljetoff Tauno Juhani	Inari
Pieski Pentti Ilmari	Utsjoki
Hirvasvuopio Janne Kalervo	Espoo
Lukkari Sammol Antti	Utsjoki
Pekkala Aslak Timo	Inari
Tapiola Nilla Samuli	Utsjoki
Magga Ellen Ulla-Maarit	Enontekiö
Semenoff Tinja Sofia	Rovaniemi
Aikio Matti Ville Gabriel	Sodankylä
Kiprianoff Maarit Ulla Katariina	Helsinki
Katajamaa Marko Tapio	Inari
Avaskari Anu Aino-Sisko Maarit	Inari
Niittyvuopio Inga Anni-Sofia	Utsjoki
Länsman Asko Tapani	Utsjoki
Porsanger Markku Eelis	Utsjoki
Suoninen Anne Margareetta	Inari
Näkkäläjärvi Pirita Susanna	Inari
Koivisto Anni Kaisa	Inari
Guttorm Kari Tapani	Utsjoki
Aikio Leo Jouni Olavi	Inari
Musta Inka Maria Susanna	Helsinki
Niittyvuopio-Jämsä Leena-Maaret Kaarina	Utsjoki
Lukkari Kari Toivo	Kirkkonummi
Alakorva Juha Petteri	Sodankylä
Gauriloff Mari (Minna Marianne)	Helsinki
Niittyvuopio Veijo Uula Tapani	Helsinki
Hetta Karen-Anni	Sodankylä
Feodoroff Veikko Armas	Inari
Aikio Marjaana	Inari
Juuso Tuomas Aslak	Enontekiö
Valkeapää Niko-Mihkal	Enontekiö
Keskitalo Pigga Päivi Kristiina	Enontekiö

== Results ==
Results of the 2023 Sámi Parliament of Finland election
Candidate	Vote	Mandate	
Candidate	Vote	Elected?	Area
Avaskari Anu Aino-Sisko Maarit	198		Inari
Koivisto Anni Kaisa	186		Inari
Musta Inka Maria Susanna	163		At-large
Juuso Tuomas Aslak	150		Enontekiö
Aikio Leo Jouni Olavi	148		Inari
Länsman Asko Tapani	134		Utsjoki
Nuorgam Mirva Anne Marjatta	132		Utsjoki
Keskitalo Pigga Päivi Kristiina	132		Enontekiö
Näkkäläjärvi Pirita Susanna	124		At-large
Magga Ellen Ulla-Maarit	119		Enontekiö
Niittyvuopio-Jämsä Leena-Maaret Kaarina	111		Utsjoki
Pekkala Aslak Timo	110		At-large
Hirvasvuopio Janne Kalervo	109		At-large
Tapiola Nilla Samuli	105		At-large
Ljetoff Tauno Juhani	97		At-large
Feodoroff Veikko Armas	94		At-large
Katajamaa Marko Tapio	89		At-large
Lukkari Kari Toivo	87		At-large
Hetta Karen-Anni	85		Sodankylä
Pieski Pentti Ilmari	81	Deputy	Utsjoki
Gauriloff Mari (Minna Marianne)	78		
Valkeapää Niko-Mihkal	65	Deputy	Enontekiö
Niittyvuopio Veijo Uula Tapani	65		
Niittyvuopio Inga Anni-Sofia	58		
Porsanger Markku Eelis	55		
Aikio Marjaana	55	Deputy	Inari
Guttorm Kari Tapani	48		
Palonoja Armi Tuulikki	46		Sodankylä
Alakorva Juha Petteri	45		Sodankylä
Semenoff Tinja Sofia	42		
Kiprianoff Maarit Ulla Katariina	30		
Aikio Matti Ville Gabriel	27	Deputy	Sodankylä
Lukkari Sammol Antti	25		
Suoninen Anne Margareetta	26		

=== Turnout by area ===
Turnout was highest among voters in Utsjoki and lowest among registered voters outside of Finland.

Area		Votes cast	Registered	Turnout
Sámi homeland	Enontekiö	196	288	68.06%
Sámi homeland	Inari	799	1,452	55.03%
Sámi homeland	Sodankylä	146	268	54.48%
Sámi homeland	Utsjoki	339	461	73.54%
Rest of Finland		1,649	3,224	51.15%
Overseas voters		87	367	23.71%
Total		3,129	6,060	51.63%
