= Aikio =

Aikio is a Sami-language surname. Notable people with the surname include:

- Matti Aikio (born 1872), Sami writer
- Pekka Aikio (born 1944), Sami politician
- Inger-Mari Aikio-Arianaick (born 1961), Sami poet
- Ante Aikio (born 1977), Finnish linguist of Sami origin
- Tiina Sanila-Aikio (born 1983), Sami singer, teacher, and politician

== See also ==
- Aiko
