= Jiella =

Saami band

- Origin: Karigasniemi, Utsjoki, Finland
- Genres: pop; disco; yoik
- Years active: 1999–
- Label: Skádja Studio
- Members: Niilo Rasmus; Eeva-Liisa Rasmus; Jenna Rasmus; Titta Rasmus
- Past members: Mia Rasmus

Jiella was a multi-generational Saami pop group formed in Karigasniemi, Utsjoki, Finland in 1999, led by singer-songwriter and musician Niilo Rasmus. The band was at the forefront of the modernization of the traditional luohti of the Saami living along the Teno, when they started to incorporate Western musical elements such as pop and disco into the traditional luohti. Their entire repertoire is in Northern Saami and is still an integral part of the play lists on Saami radio stations today.

== History ==
Jiella's history starts in the mid-1990s when Niilo Rasmus formed a group with his two of his four daughters, Eeva-Liisa and Jenna. In 1999, they sang the songs their father had written and composed for the first time together in public. At that point in time, the band was known as Niilo ja nieiddat (Niilo and his daughters). In 1999, the band's name changed to Jiella, which means a gentle breeze in Northern Saami. At this point in time a third sister, Mia, joined the group.

At the Saami Easter celebrations in 2002, Jiella participated in the singing category of the Sámi Grand Prix with the song Čeavli (Arrogance) Later on that year, in December, Jiella's first album Gosnu (Somewhere) was released. This is the only album that Mia Rasmus sings on. Songs from this album were heavily played on Saami radio stations across Norway, Sweden, Finland, and Russia.

Four years later, on July 8, 2006, their second album, Eallinbálgát (Life's paths), was released. While the majority of the songs on this album were written and composed by Niilo Rasmus, the yoik Olát was written together with Ilmari Rasmus and the songs Amma ealát fámolaččat, Dovddatgo ruonas hája, and Čakčamodji sániid were written by Saami poet Inger-Mari Aikio-Arianaick. The same year, Aikio-Arianaick made a short documentary film about the band called Dálvemáilmmi bivut or Sámi winter clothing.

In addition to their own albums, Jiella has also performed on the album of the 2002 Sámi Grand Prix and Inger-Mari Aikio-Arianaick's album of children's songs called Ima ipmašat - mánáidlávlagat from 2007.

== Discography ==
=== Gosnu ===
1. Sámi Álbmot (The Sámi People)
2. Jaskat
3. Olát Ánde
4. Gollejohka
5. Gosnu (Somewhere)
6. Váimmu Ganjal
7. Luonddu Giella
8. Láhpon Áigi
9. Čáppa Niehku
10. Mánáš

=== Eallinbálgát ===
1. Amma ealát fámolaččat
2. Gufihtar
3. Beaivváža modji
4. Fuolkevuohta
5. Muittut
6. Bábergumppet
7. Nuorra eallin
8. Dovddatgo ruonas hája
9. Otná beaivi
10. Olát
11. Eallinbálgát
12. Čakčamodji

== Members ==
- Niilo Rasmus - instruments, vocals
- Eeva-Liisa Rasmus - vocals
- Jenna Rasmus - vocals

=== Musicians on Eallinbálgát ===
- Niilo Rasmus, instruments, vocals
- Eeva-Liisa Rasmus - vocals
- Jenna Rasmus - vocals
- Roger Ludvigsen - guitars, bouzouki, e-bow
- Antti Sujala - mouth harp
