= List of presidents of the Sámi Parliament of Finland =

List of presidents of the Sámi Parliament of Finland.

This is a list of presidents (speakers) of the Sámi Parliament of Finland since that body was established in 1996:

Name	Entered office	Left office
Pekka Aikio	1996	2008
Klemetti Näkkäläjärvi	9 February 2008	28 March 2015
Tiina Sanila	28 March 2015	28 February 2020
Tuomas Aslak Juuso	28 February 2020	30 January 2024
Pirita Näkkäläjärvi	30 January 2024	Incumbent
