= Utsjoen kirkonkylä =

Village in Lapland, Finland

Utsjoen kirkonkylä (Finnish) Ohcejoga girkogilli (Northern Sami)
- Village
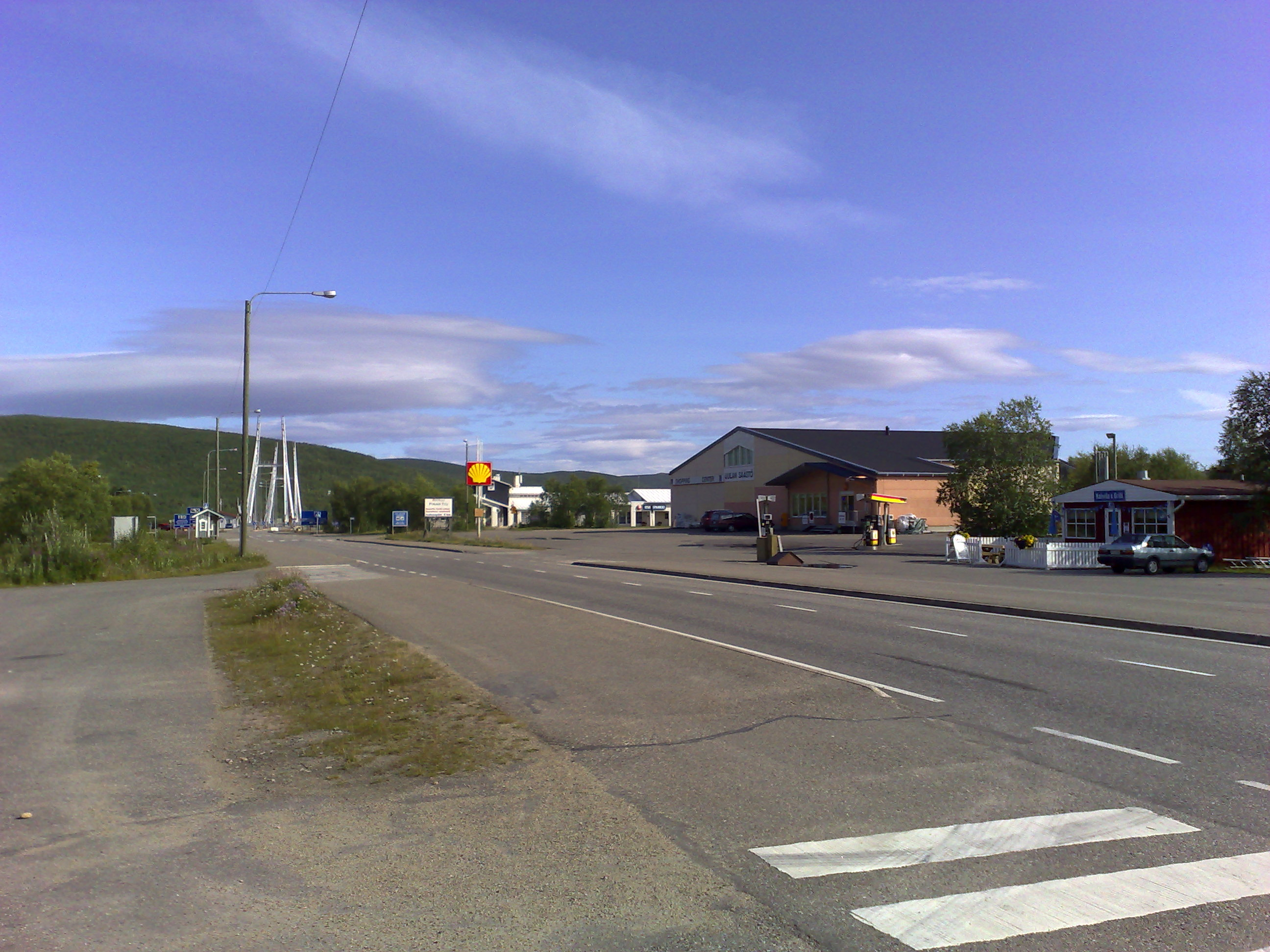
- The village centre along Highway 4 (E75). At the end of the road, the Sami Bridge in the background.

- Location in Finland
- Coordinates: 69°54′25″N 27°01′25″E
- Country: Finland
- Province: Lapland
- Municipality: Utsjoki

Population
  - Total: 319
- Time zone: UTC+2 (EET)

Utsjoen kirkonkylä (Northern Sami: Ohcejoga girkogilli; lit. 'Utsjoki church village') is the administrative center of the Utsjoki municipality in Lapland, Finland. It is located along the Tana River, which flows on the border between Finland and Norway. At the end of 2015, the settlement had 319 residents.

The services of the village include Posti and Osuuspankki branches, as well as the Lapland Rescue Department's fire station. The village also has a Uulan Säästö department store, the Giisá Village Hall (which serves as a café and tourist information centre), the Pub Rastigaisa restaurant, and Hotel Utsjoki.

== See also ==
- Karigasniemi
- Nuorgam
