= Kaamasmukka =

Kaamasmukka (Finnish) Gámasmohkki (Northern Sami) Kaamâsmokke (Inari Sami)
- Village
- Location in Finland
- Coordinates: 69°20′46″N 26°32′25″E
- Country: Finland
- Region: Lapland
- Municipality: Utsjoki

Kaamasmukka (Northern Sami: Gámasmohkki, Inari Sami: Kaamâsmokke) is a small village in Finland in Lapland in the northernmost Finnish municipality of Utsjoki. It is located 27 km east of the village of Karigasniemi directly at the main road 92 (Kantatie 92) in the direction of the village of Kaamanen and there the Finnish national road 4 Helsinki-Utsjoki.

4 km southwest of the small village is the fell Kaktsvarri (in Northern Sámi Gákcavarri) with a height of 446 MASL.
