= Helvi Nuorgam-Poutasuo =

Helvi Nuorgam-Poutasuo (October 15, 1943 – July 16, 2017) was a Sámi teacher, translator, and newspaper editor as well as a politician and a Sámi cultural influencer. She was the first lecturer in Northern Sámi at the University of Oulu.

== Biography ==
Helvi Nuorgam was born in Utsjoki, Finland on October 15, 1943. Her parents were Niillas-Jon Niillas (Finnish: Niiles Nuorgam) and Ápparan-Mággá (Finnish: Magga Nuorgam, née Helander). Her father's family was from Utsjoki and Inari, while her mother's family was from Utsjoki. Poutasuo attended schools in Ivalo and Mäntsälä. In 1962, she was selected as that year's High School Girl by Uusi Suomi. She studied Finno-Ugric languages, including Northern Sámi, at the University of Helsinki.

In 1967, she married Kari Poutasuo. She was a lecturer in the Sámi languages at the University of Oulu from 1970 to 1972. She edited the Sámi language magazine Sápmelaš with Pekka Sammallahti, Samuli Aikio, and Sulo Aikio. The editorial board of Sápmelaš was awarded the State Prize for Information Publication for its newspaper work in 1976.

From 1976 to 1987 and 1992 to 1995, she was a member of the Sámi Parliament of Finland (Vice-Chair, 1977–79 and 1992–95). From 1996 to 1999, she was a member of the Saami Council.

Nuorgam-Poutasuo died in Utsjoki, July 16, 2017.
