= Finnish national road 4 =

Road in Finland

National Road 4
- Valtatie 4 (Finnish); Riksväg 4 (Swedish)
- Finnish: Nelostie, Swedish: Riksfyran; Finnish: Lahdenväylä; Swedish: Lahtisleden
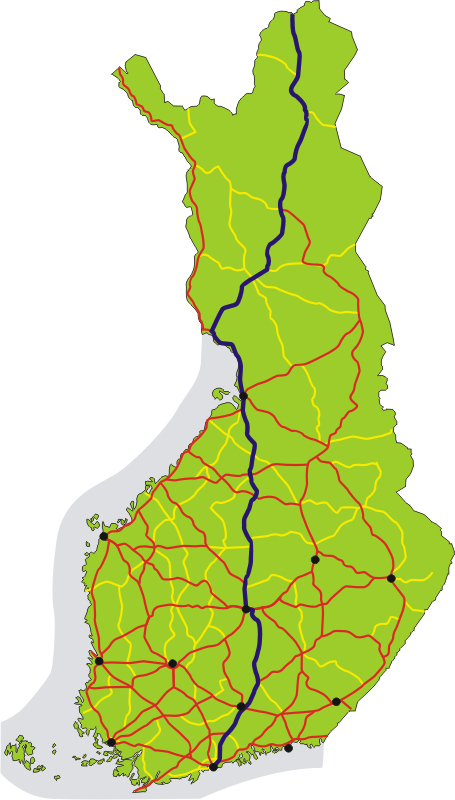

Route information
- Part of E75
- Maintained by the Finnish Transport Agency
- Length: 1,295 km (805 mi)
- Existed: 1938–present

Major junctions
- From: Helsinki
- Highway 7 (14 km) in Helsinki Ring 3 (17 km) in Vantaa Highway 25 and Highway 55 (59 km) Highway 12 (103 km) in Lahti Highway 12 (105 km) in Lahti Highway 24 (107 km) Highway 46 (144 km) Highway 5 (148 km) Highway 9, Highway 13 and Highway 23 (260 km) Highway 9, Highway 18 and Highway 23 (269 km) Highway 69 and road 627 (301 km) Highway 13 (307 km) Highway 77 (364 km) Highway 77 (377 km) Highway 27 (450 km) Highway 58 (483 km) Highway 28 (484 km) Highway 88 (516 km) Highway 8 (585 km) Highway 22 (606 km) Highway 20 (610 km) Highway 29 (723 km) Highway 79 and Highway 78 (830 km) Highway 81 (832 km) Highway 82 (856 km) Highway 80 and Highway 5 (958 km) Highway 91 (1117 km) Highway 92 (1181 km) Highway 92 (1187 km) Norwegian border (1283 km)
- To: Utsjoki

Location
- Country: Finland
- Major cities: Lahti, Jyväskylä, Oulu, Kemi, Rovaniemi

Highway system
- Highways in Finland
← Vt 3	→ Vt 5

Finnish national road 4 (Finnish: Valtatie 4 or Nelostie; Swedish: Riksväg 4 or Riksfyran; also known as Lahti Highway (Finnish: Lahdenväylä; Swedish: Lahtisleden) in the Helsinki Metropolitan Area) is a highway in Finland. It is the main route from Helsinki to Northern Finland and a major road link in the country. It runs from Erottaja in Helsinki to Sami Bridge in Utsjoki. The road is 1,295 kilometres (805 mi) long, making it Finland's longest highway. The road is also part of the European route E75 and of TERN; the section between Oulu and Kemi is part of the European route E8.

== Overview ==
The route of the road is Helsinki – Lahti – Heinola – Jyväskylä – Äänekoski – Oulu – Kemi – Rovaniemi – Sodankylä – Ivalo – Inari – Utsjoki.

At Heinola, another highway called Finnish national road 5 branches off from the road, which passes through Mikkeli, Kuopio, Kajaani and Kuusamo, and finally rejoins Highway 4 at Sodankylä.

The original highway 4 ran from Helsinki to Petsamo before World War II. Since the end of the war, the road has been rerouted to Ivalo and Karigasniemi on the Norwegian border. Other route modifications have been made through the years.

== Images ==
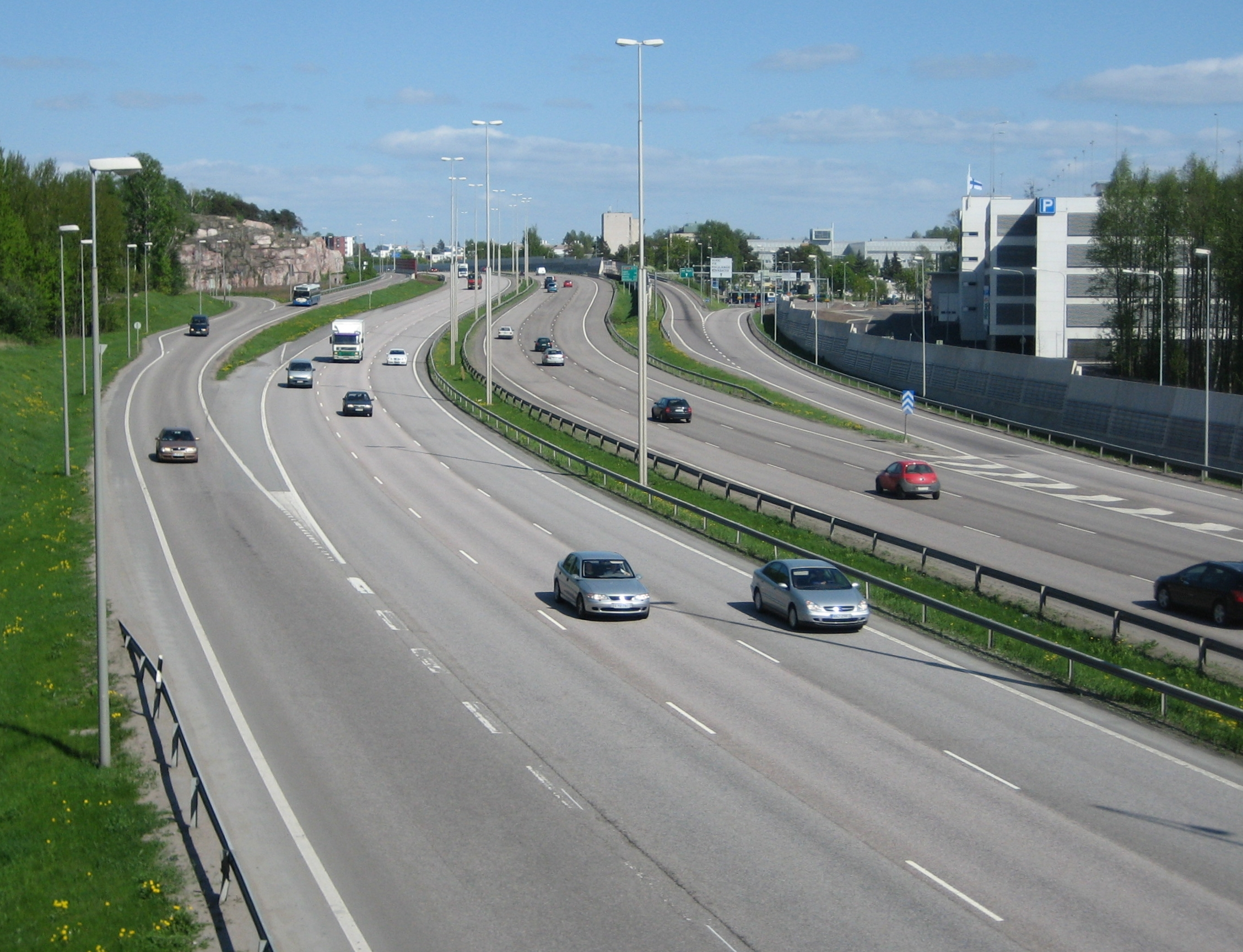
Viikki suburb, Helsinki

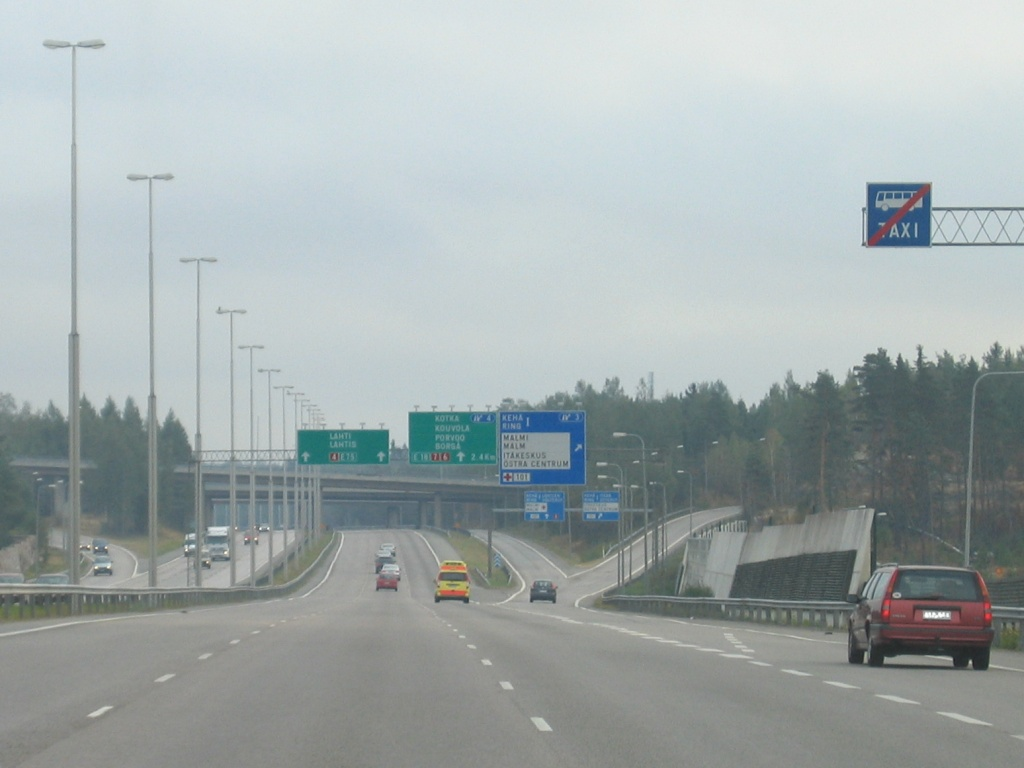
Ring I interchange, Helsinki

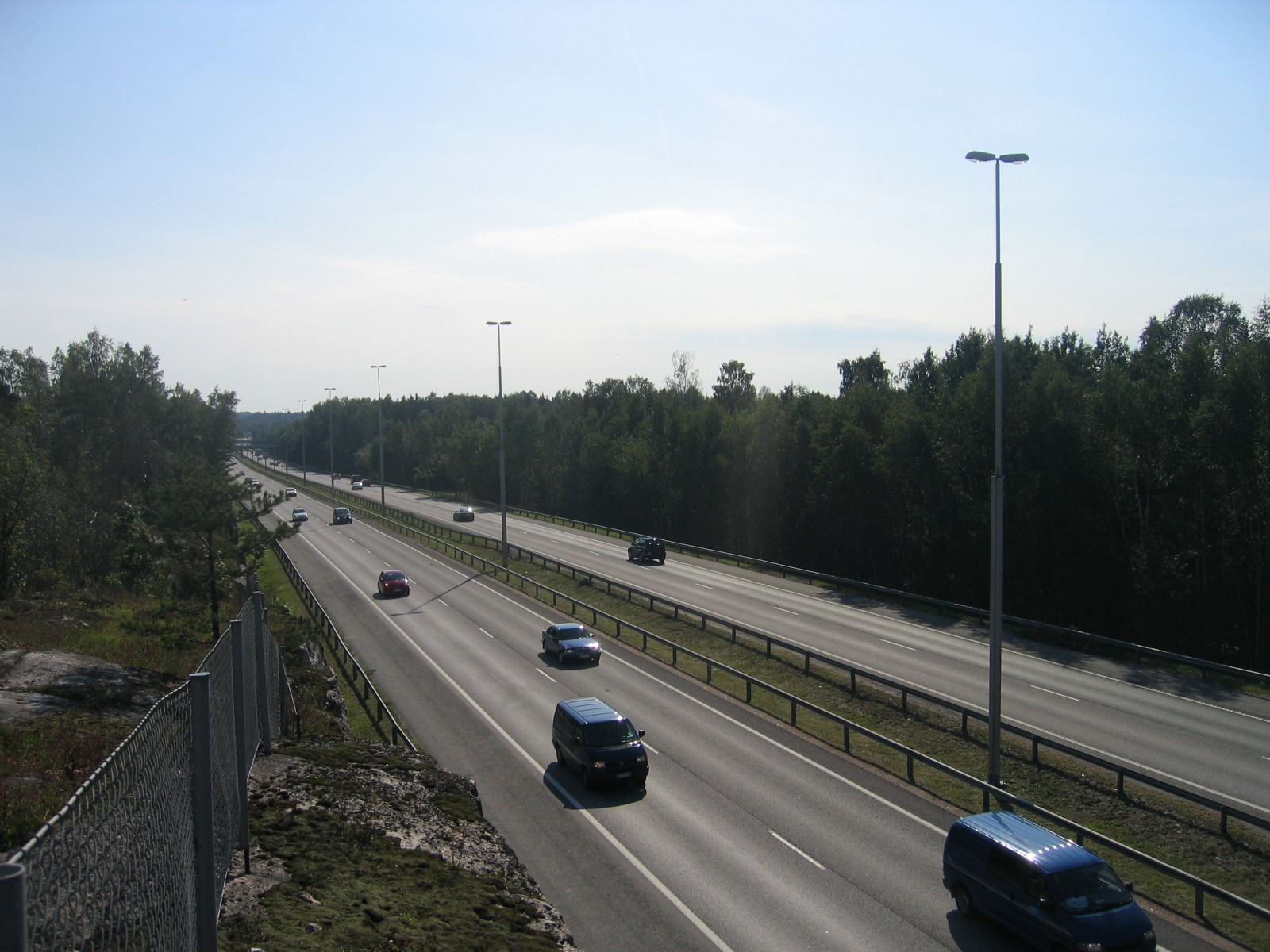
Jakomäki suburb, Helsinki

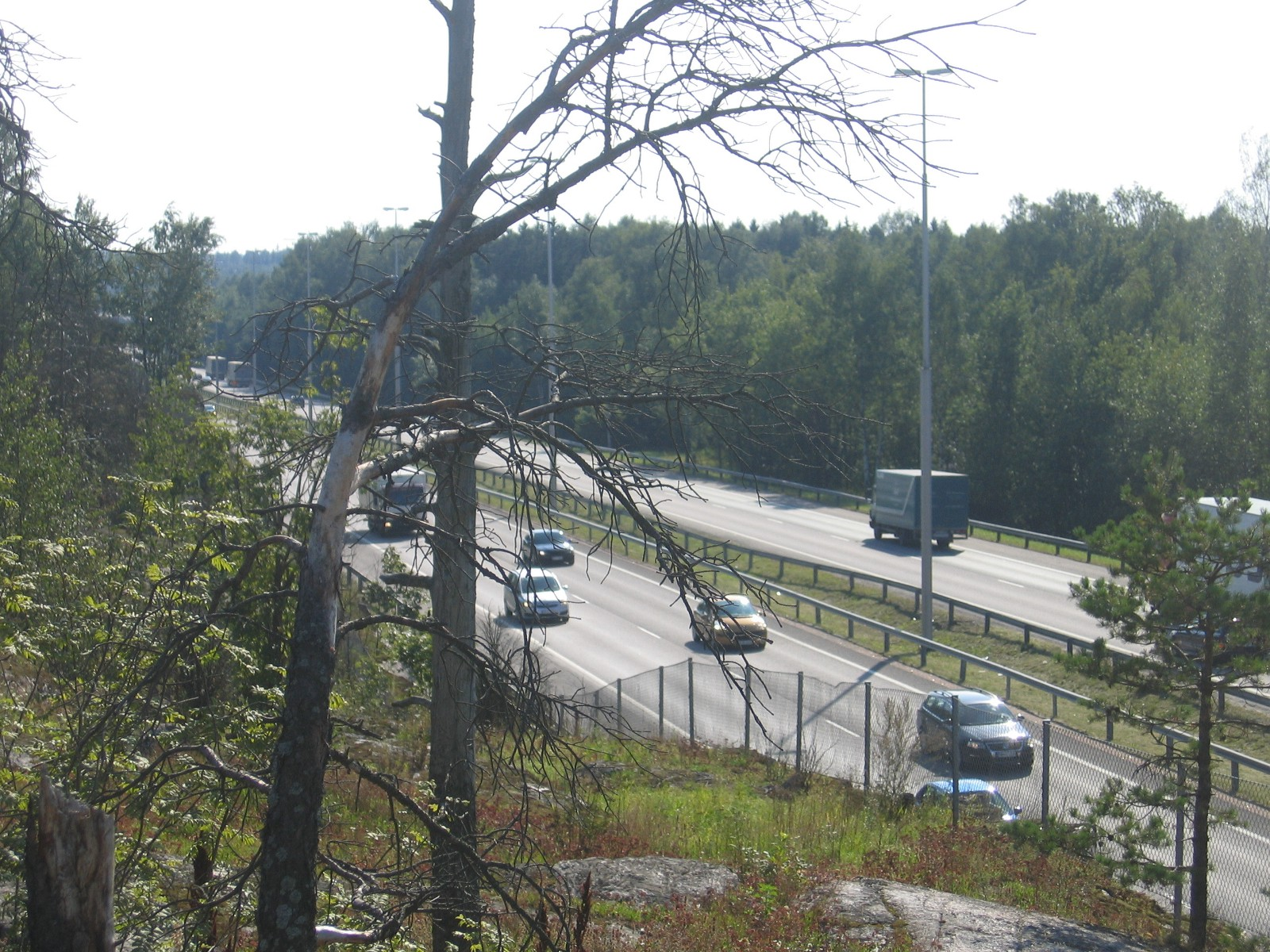
Jakomäki suburb, Helsinki

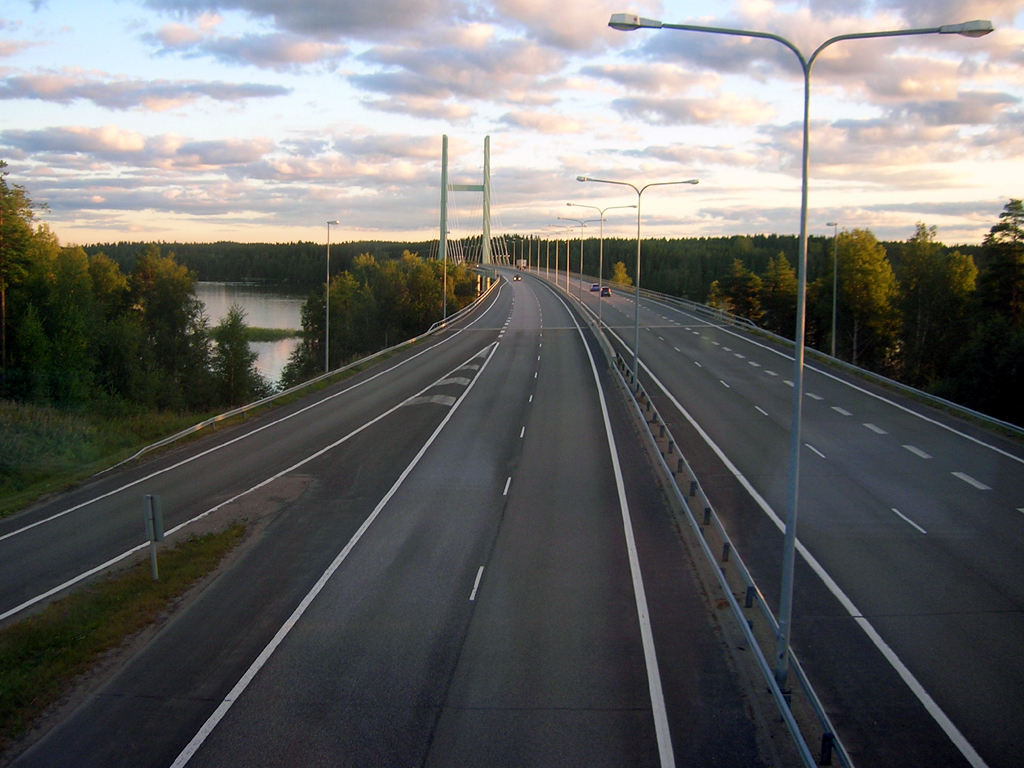
Tähtiniemi Bridge in Heinola

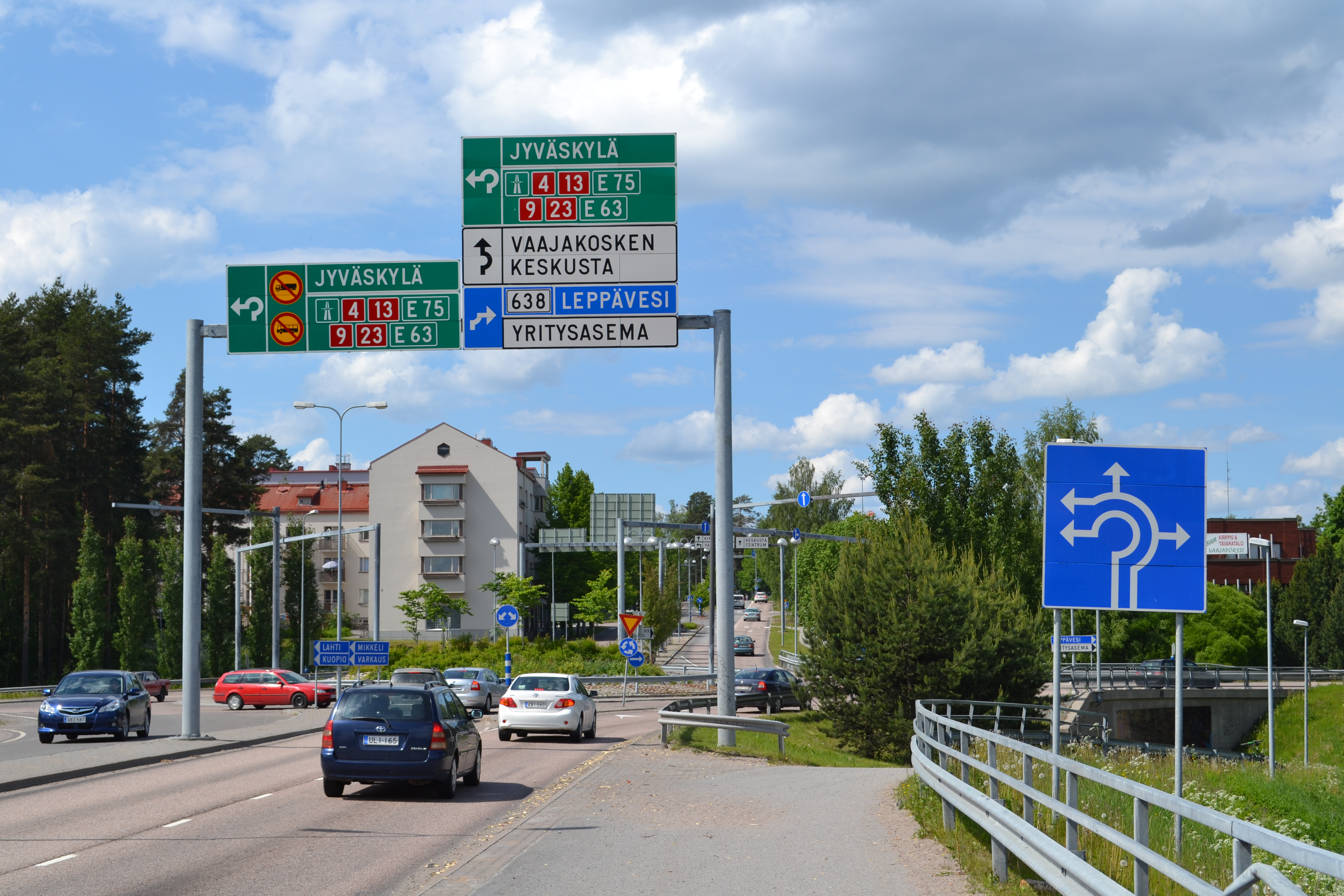
Vaajakoski roundabout in Jyväskylä

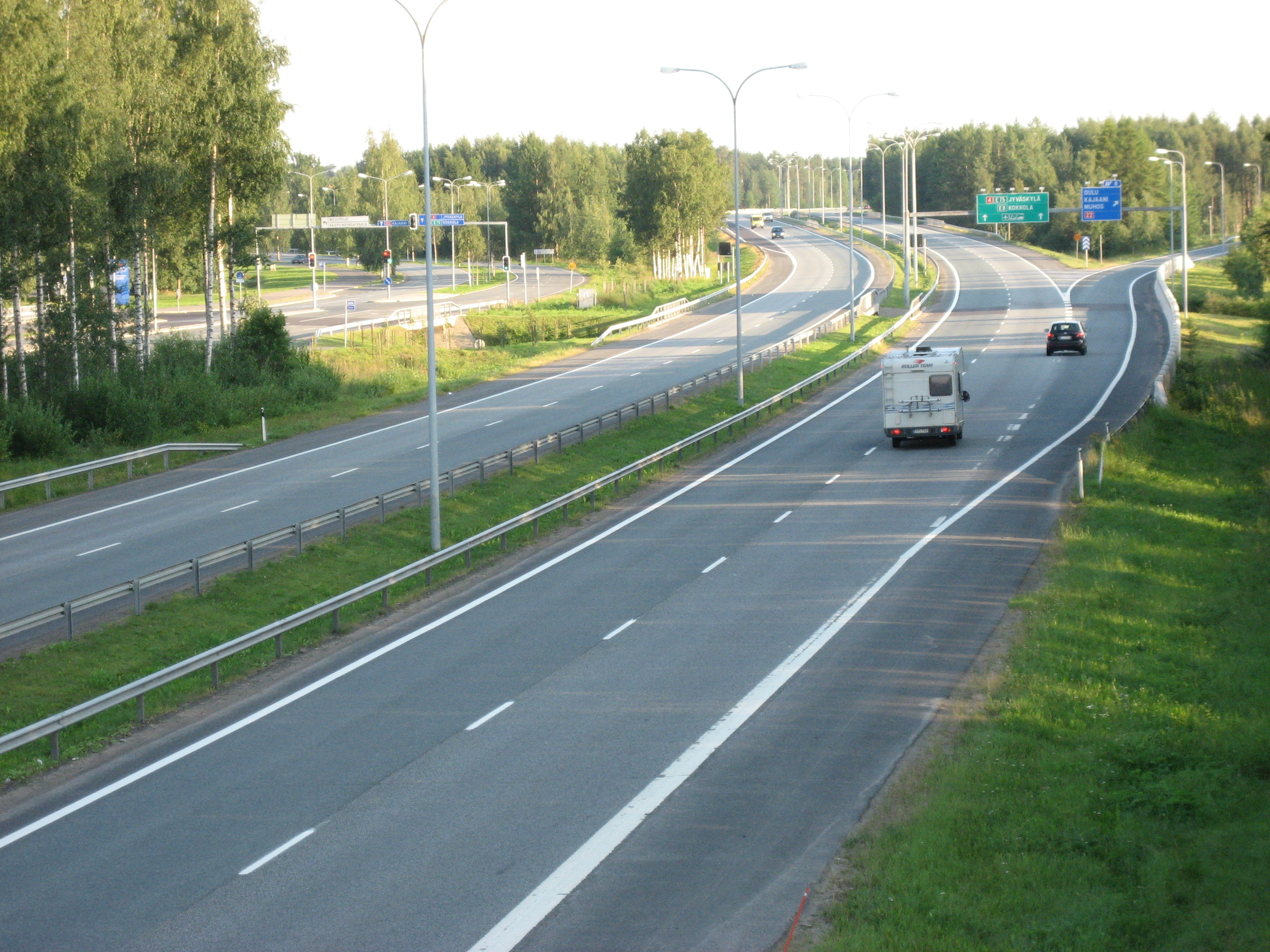
Kontinkangas suburb, Oulu

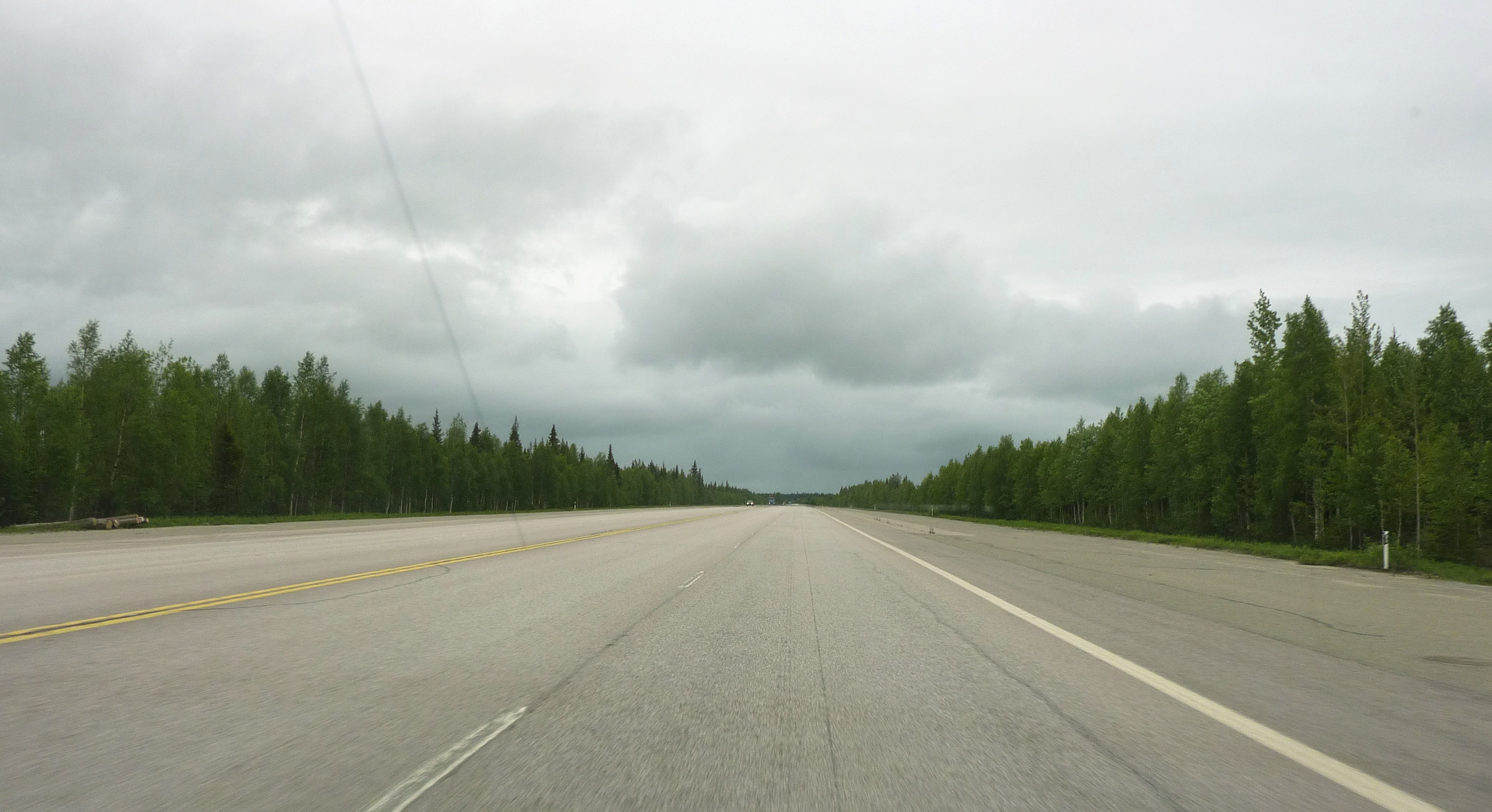
Broad shoulder between Rovaniemi and Sodankylä

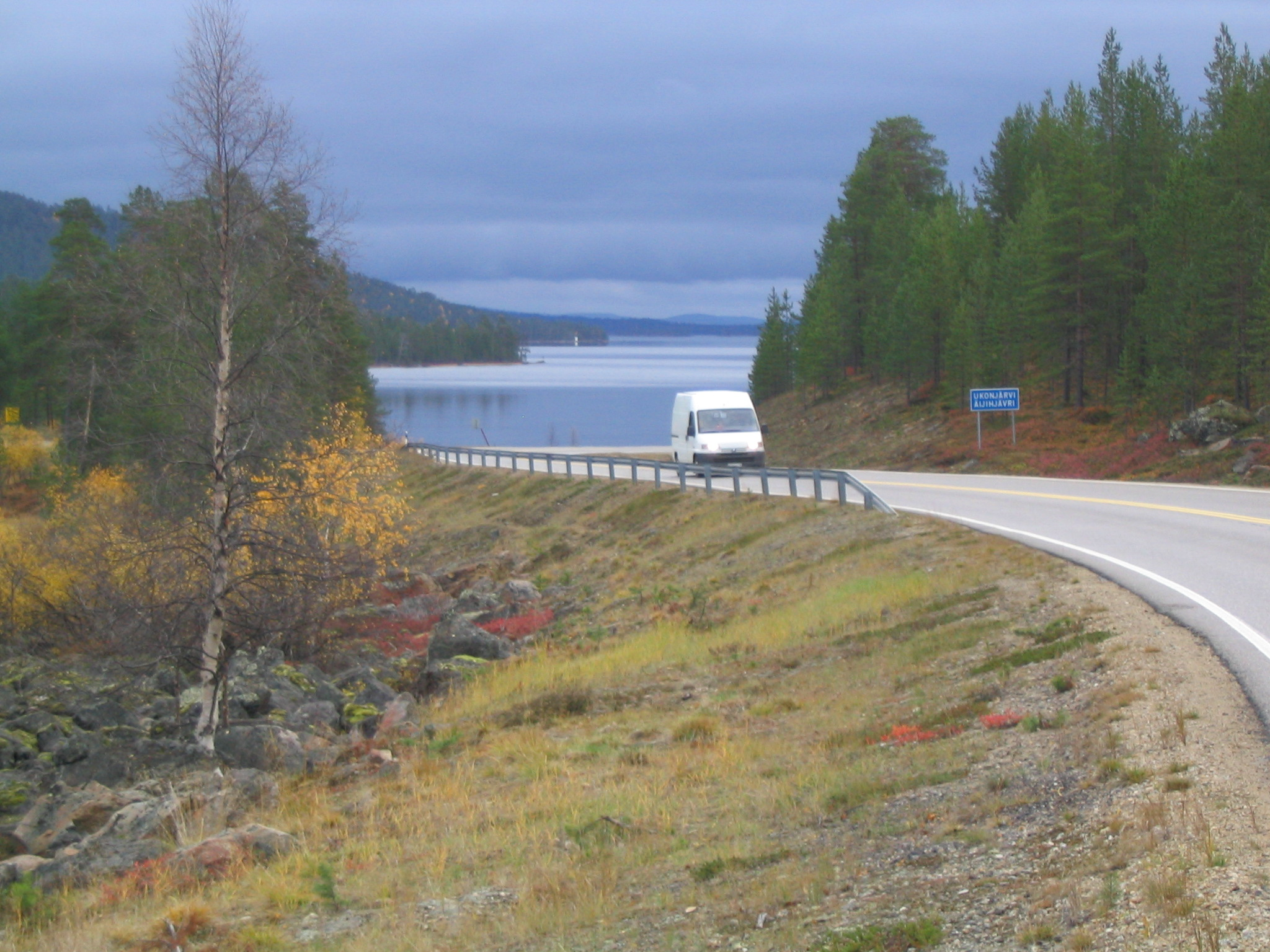
Ukonjärvi, Inari

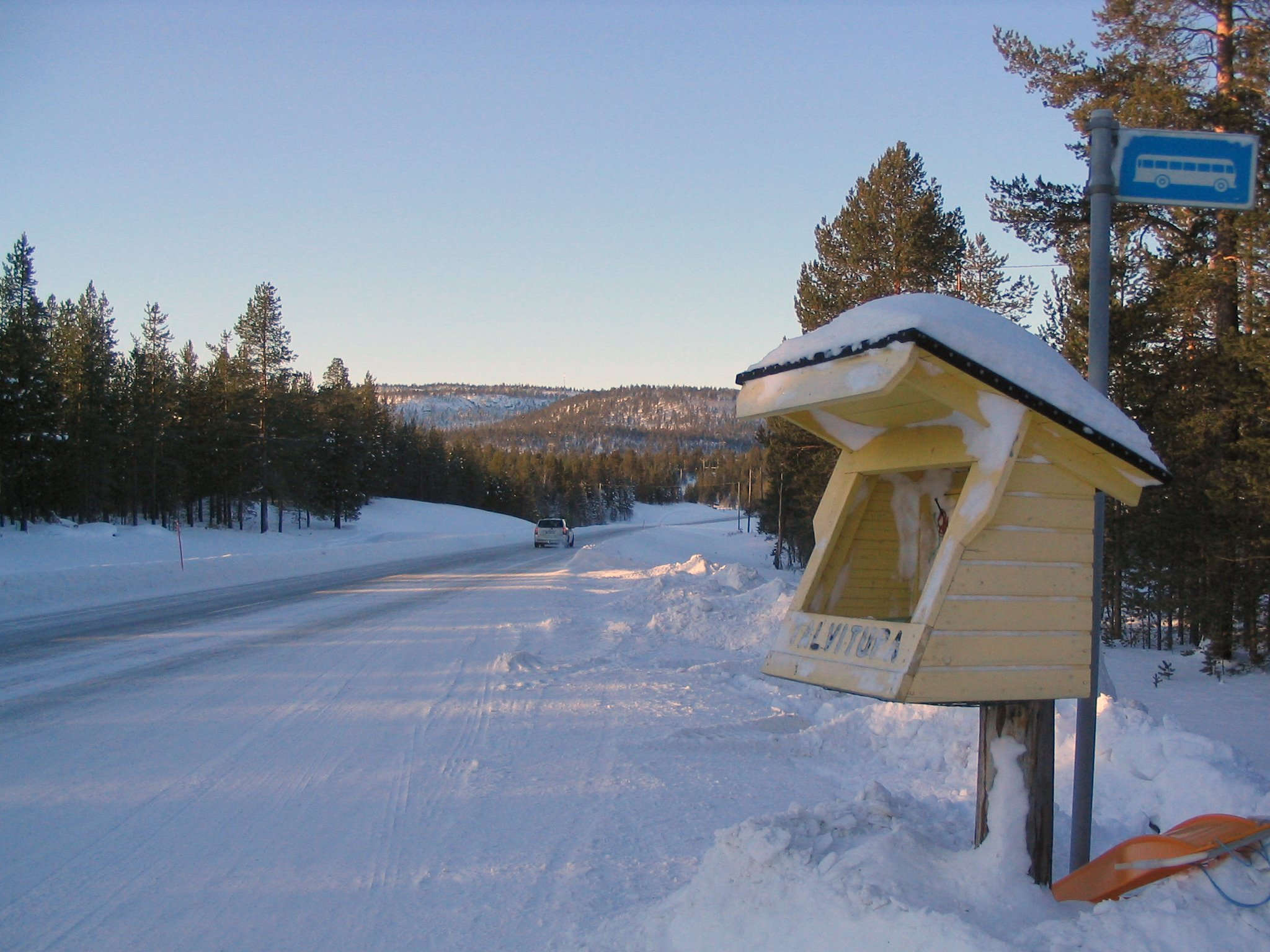
Talvitupa, Inari

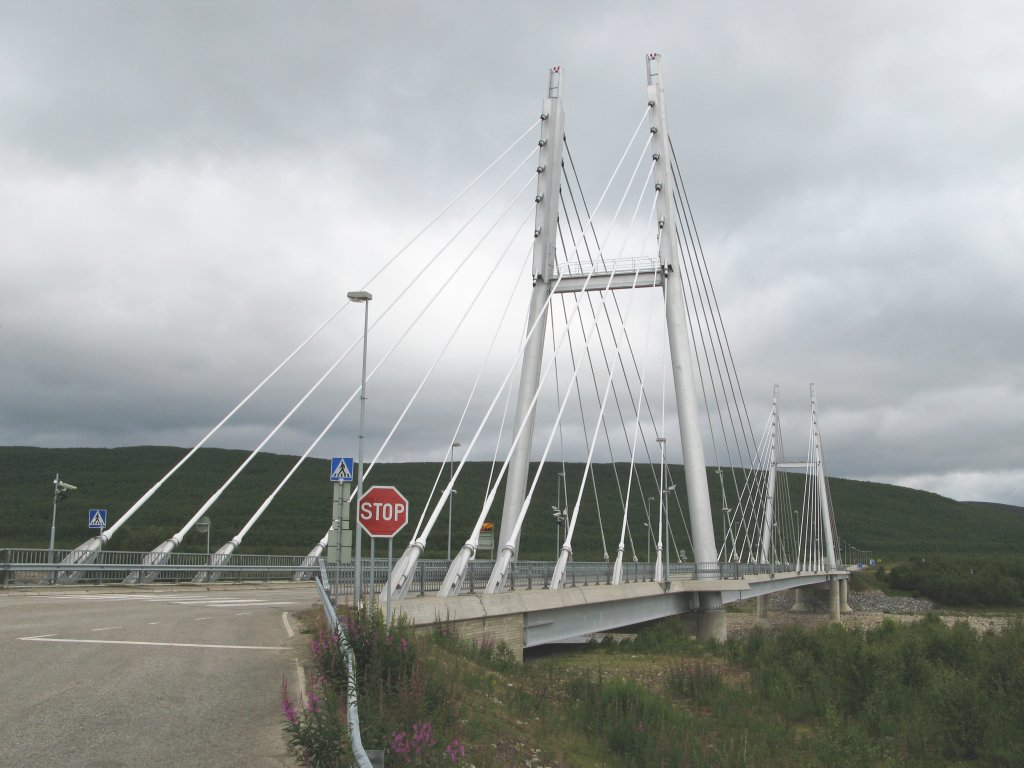
Sami Bridge in the Utsjoki village, end point of national road 4

== See also ==
- Finnish national road 58
- Highways in Finland
- Åland Highway 4
