= Sámi homeland (Finland) =

Autonomous area in Lapland region, Finland

Coordinates: 69°N 27°E

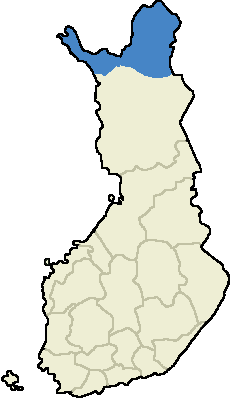
Location of the Sami Domicile Area in Finland.

The Sámi homeland of Finland (Finnish: Saamelaisten kotiseutualue, Northern Sami: Sámiid ruovttuguovllu, Swedish: Samernas hembygdsområde), sometimes officially translated as the Sámi Domicile Area, is the northernmost part of the Lappi (Lapland) administrative region in Finland, home of approximately half of Finland's Sámi population. The area is defined in and protected by the Finnish constitution (17 § and 121 §) to be autonomous on issues relating to the Sámi culture and language.

The Sámi homeland consists of the municipalities of Enontekiö, Utsjoki and Inari as well as a part of the municipality of Sodankylä. Finns are the majority population on the area. An important activity organized in Finland's Sámi homeland is the election of the Sámi Parliament of Finland (Saamelaiskäräjät) every four years. Only Sámi residents are eligible in the elections. The Sámi Parliament of Finland was established in 1973.

Depending on the definition of "Sámi", various percentages may be given for Sámi population's share in different municipalities. The Finnish Population Registry Center does not register ethnicity. They do register language, based on what the parents tell at birth and later changes. Based on this, the percentages of people with a Sámi mother tongue in the municipalities are:

- Inari 5.7%
- Enontekiö 7.4%
- Utsjoki 46.7%
- Sodankylä 1.4%

However, the Sámi Parliament of Finland applies a wider definition by defining a Sámi as a person who considers himself a Sámi and has at least one parent or grandparent who spoke a Sámi language. Thus the official percentages are:

- Inari 30%
- Enontekiö 19%
- Utsjoki 70%
- Sodankylä 4%
