= Irja Seurujärvi-Kari =

Finnish Sámi politician and academic

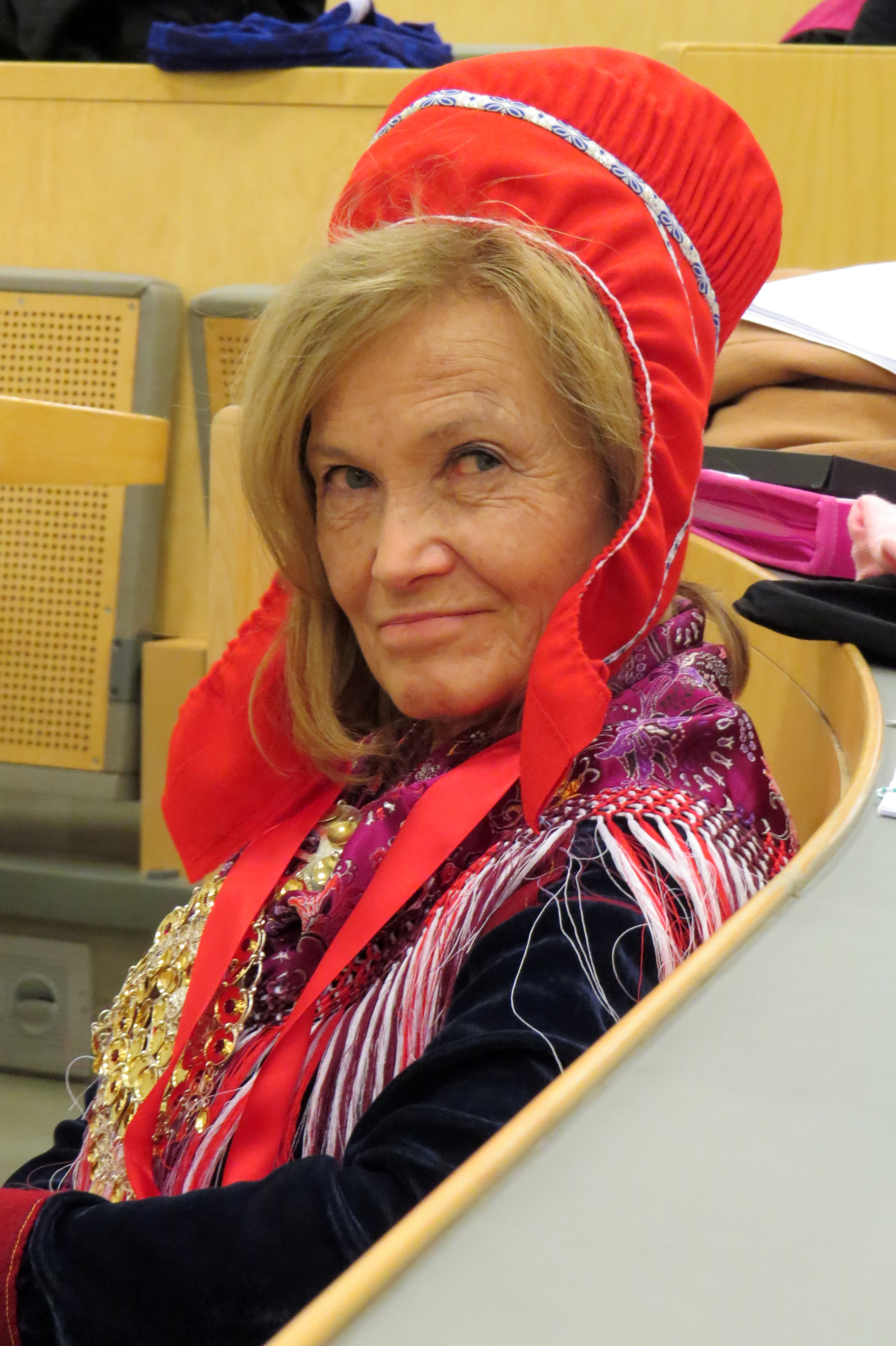
Irja Seurujärvi-Kari in 2019

Irja Seurujärvi-Kari (born 21 March 1947, Utsjoki) is a Finnish Sámi politician and academic.

== Education and academic career ==
Seurujärvi-Kari obtained a master's degree in English philology from the University of Oulu in 1974, and a PhD in Finno-Ugric languages from the University of Helsinki in 2012. Her doctoral thesis is notable for having been the first to be submitted in any of the Sámi languages at the University of Helsinki.

Seurujärvi-Kari has held various research and teaching (secondary and higher education) positions, most notably as the only Lecturer in Sámi language and culture at the University of Helsinki since 1986. Her research interests include Sámi language, culture and identity politics, as well as wider indigenous peoples rights and issues.

She chairs the Sámi language and culture research society, Dutkansearvi.

== Political career ==
In 2019, Seurujärvi-Kari was elected Member of the Sámi Parliament of Finland.

She is Vice Chair of the Parliament's Sámi Language Council.

She was president of the Saami Council in 1991 and 1992.

== Awards and honours ==
In 1996, Seurujärvi-Kari was awarded Knight of the Order of the White Rose of Finland.

She was awarded the annual State Award for Public Information (Tiedonjulkistamisen valtionpalkinto) by the Finnish Ministry of Education and Culture for the 2005 book titled The Saami — a cultural encyclopaedia, which she co-authored.
