= Pekka Aikio =

Saami politician

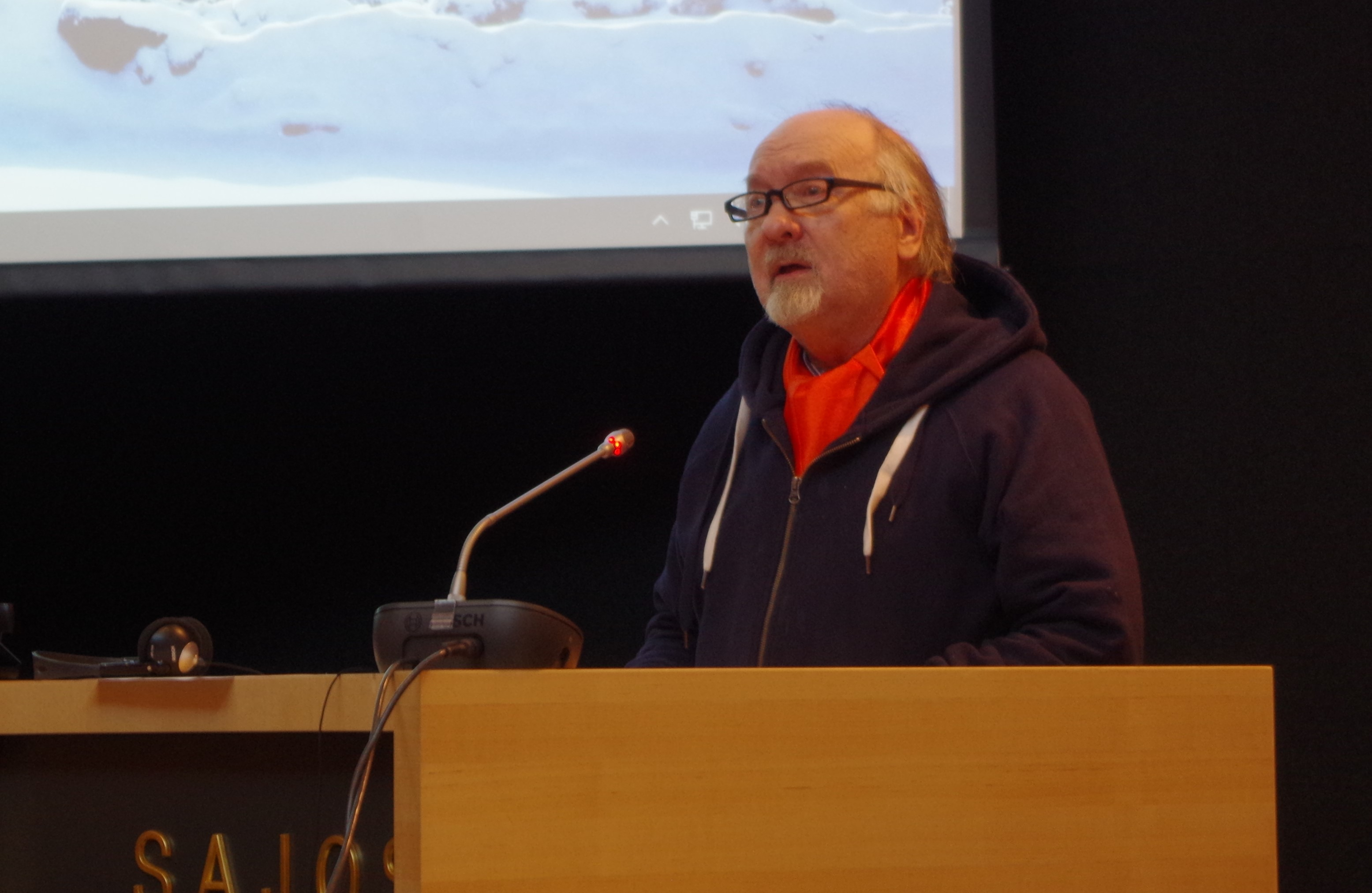
Veli Pekka Olavi Aikio

Veli Pekka Olavi Aikio (born 21 September 1944) served as the president of the Sami Parliament of Finland for three terms from 1996 to 2008. Aikio's most important cause as a politician was land rights. Pekka Aikio is also a member of the Forest Stewardship Council (FSC) working group and works in close co-operation with the Greenpeace organizations of various countries.

== Early life and education ==
Born in Sodankylä, Finland, Aikio is the son of a Sámi reindeer herder. Having studied biology at the University of Oulu, he graduated with an M.A. in 1986.
