= Irja Koikson =

Estonian footballer

Personal information
- Date of birth: 18 July 1980 (age 46)
- Place of birth: Pärnu, then part of Estonian SSR, Soviet Union
- Position: Midfielder

International career^{‡}
Years	Team	Apps	(Gls)
1994–2005	Estonia	26	(1)
- ‡ National team caps and goals as of 22:25, 28 February 2021 (UTC)

Irja Koikson (née Reedik; born 18 July 1980) is an Estonian former footballer who played as a midfielder for the Estonia women's national team.

== Career ==
Koikson played in the first ever official match for Estonia, against Lithuania. The game took place about a month after her 14th birthday. In total, she played for the Estonia national team 26 times between 1994 and 2005, scoring one goal.
