= Nuvvus =

Village in Utsjoki municipality, Finland

Coordinates: 69.785°N 26.229°E

Nuvvus is a village on the Finland–Norway border on the Deatnu river.
