= Inger-Mari Aikio =

Saami writer and film director

- Born: 1961 (age 64–65); Utsjoki, Finland
- Education: University of Oulu
- Occupation: poet

Inger-Mari Aikio (prev. Inger-Mari Aikio-Arianaick; born 1961 in Utsjoki, Finland) is a Finnish Sámi poet who writes in Northern Sámi. In addition to writing poetry, she has worked as a reporter, photographer and proofreader for the newspaper Sámi Áigi from 1982 to 1988, after which she went to work as a news journalist for YLE Sámi Radio.

== Biography ==
After graduating from high school in 1980, Aikio studied languages at the University of Oulu. In 1992, she passed the official translator exams from Northern Sámi to Finnish and from Finnish to Northern Sámi.

Aikio has also published seven collections of poetry and children's books. Her poems have been translated in English, German, Finnish, Swedish, Hungarian.

== Awards ==
In 2013, Inger-Mari Aikio won the Skábmagovat Prize, an indigenous film award to honor the significant, long-term contributions she has made to the Sámi culture and communities. Two years later, she was awarded the Finnish State Prize for Children's Culture.

== Works ==
- Gollebiekkat almmi dievva (1989)
- Jiehki vuolde ruonas giđđa (1993)
- Silkeguobbara lákca (1995)
- Máilmmis dása (2001)
- 69 čuoldda (2018)
- Various authors (2023). Jarquín, Carlos Javier (ed.). Canto planetario: hermandad en la Tierra. Costa Rica: HC Editores. ISBN 979-8850092115.
