= Sámi Parliament of Finland =

Elected political body for the Sami people in Finland

Sámi Parliament of Finland Northern Sami: Sámediggi Inari Sami: Sämitigge Skolt Sami: Sääʹmteʹǧǧ Finnish: Saamelaiskäräjät
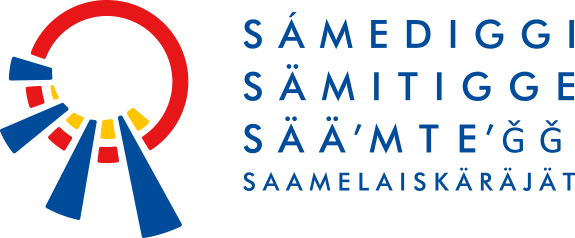

Type
- Type: Unicameral

History
- Founded: 9 November 1973
- Preceded by: Finnish Sámi Council

Leadership
- Speaker: Pirita Näkkäläjärvi since February 28, 2020
- Seats: 25

Elections
- Last election: 2023
- Next election: 2027

Meeting place
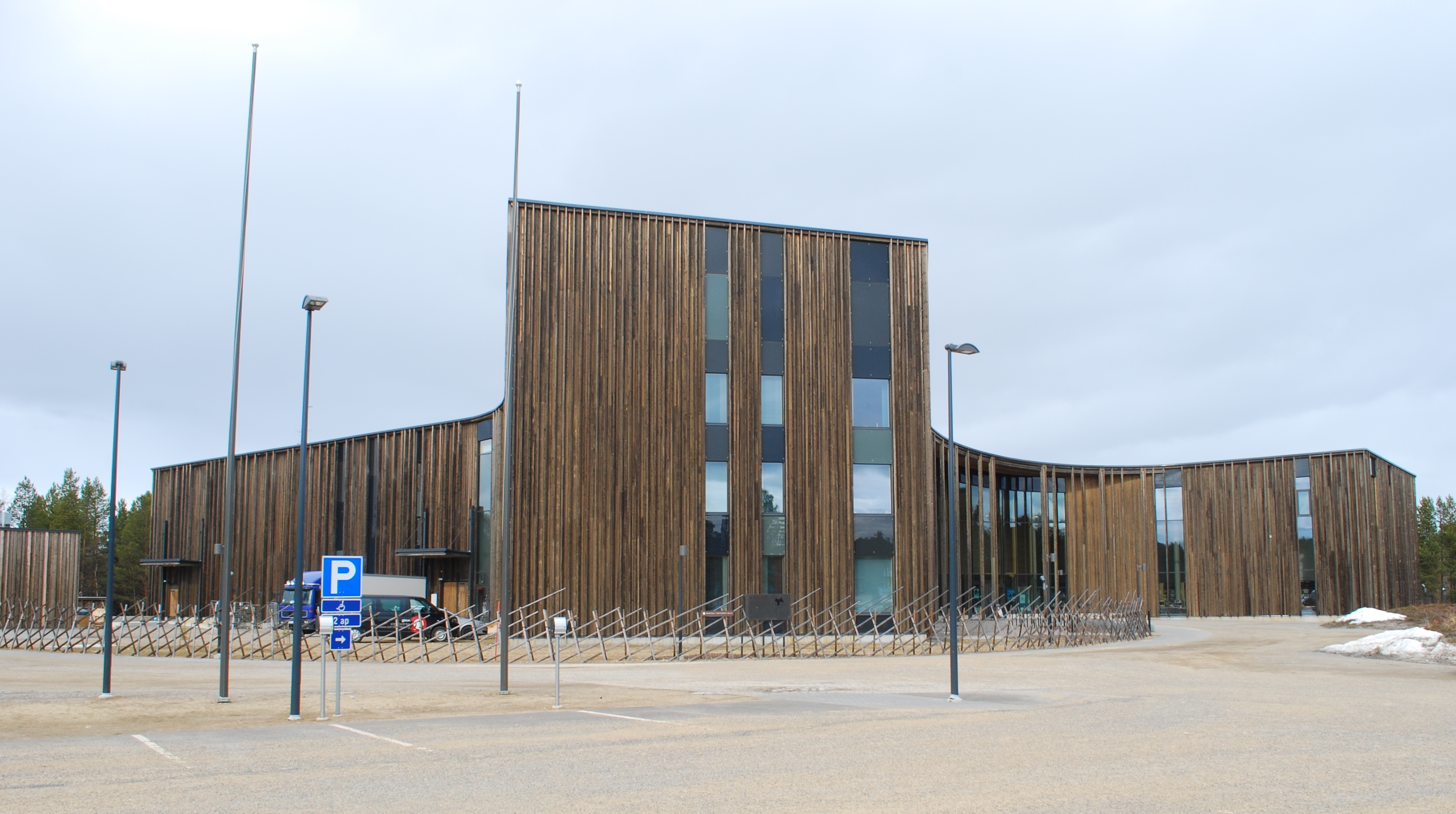
- Sajos, Inari, Finland

Website
- www.samediggi.fi

The Sámi Parliament of Finland (Northern Sami: Sámediggi, Inari Sami: Sämitigge, Skolt Sami: Sääʹmteʹǧǧ, Finnish: Saamelaiskäräjät) is the representative body for people of Sámi heritage in Finland. The parliament consists of 21 elected members and 4 elected deputy members. As of 2024, the president is Pirita Näkkäläjärvi.

== History ==
The passage of a "Sámi Act" by the Finnish Parliament and the creation of a central "Sámi Administration" to secure Sámi economic and political development and cultural self-expression were the recommendation of both the 1949-1951 and 1971-1973 Sámi Committees on State Affairs. After a trial election in 1972 with 2,649 eligible Sámi voters and a turnout rate of 72.6%, the Finnish Sámi Delegation (Sámi parlameanta in Northern Sámi, Saamelaisvaltuuskunta in Finnish) was created by decree on 9 November 1973. The 20 delegates elected in the trial election sat in the Sámi Delegation of 1973–1976.

Its successor, the Sámi Parliament (Northern Sami: Sámediggi) was legislated in 1995 and signed by President Martti Ahtisaari on 17 July 1995. This law was amended and a decree passed on 22 December 1995. On 2 March 1996, the Sámi parlameanta officially became/was replaced by Sámediggi.

== Location ==
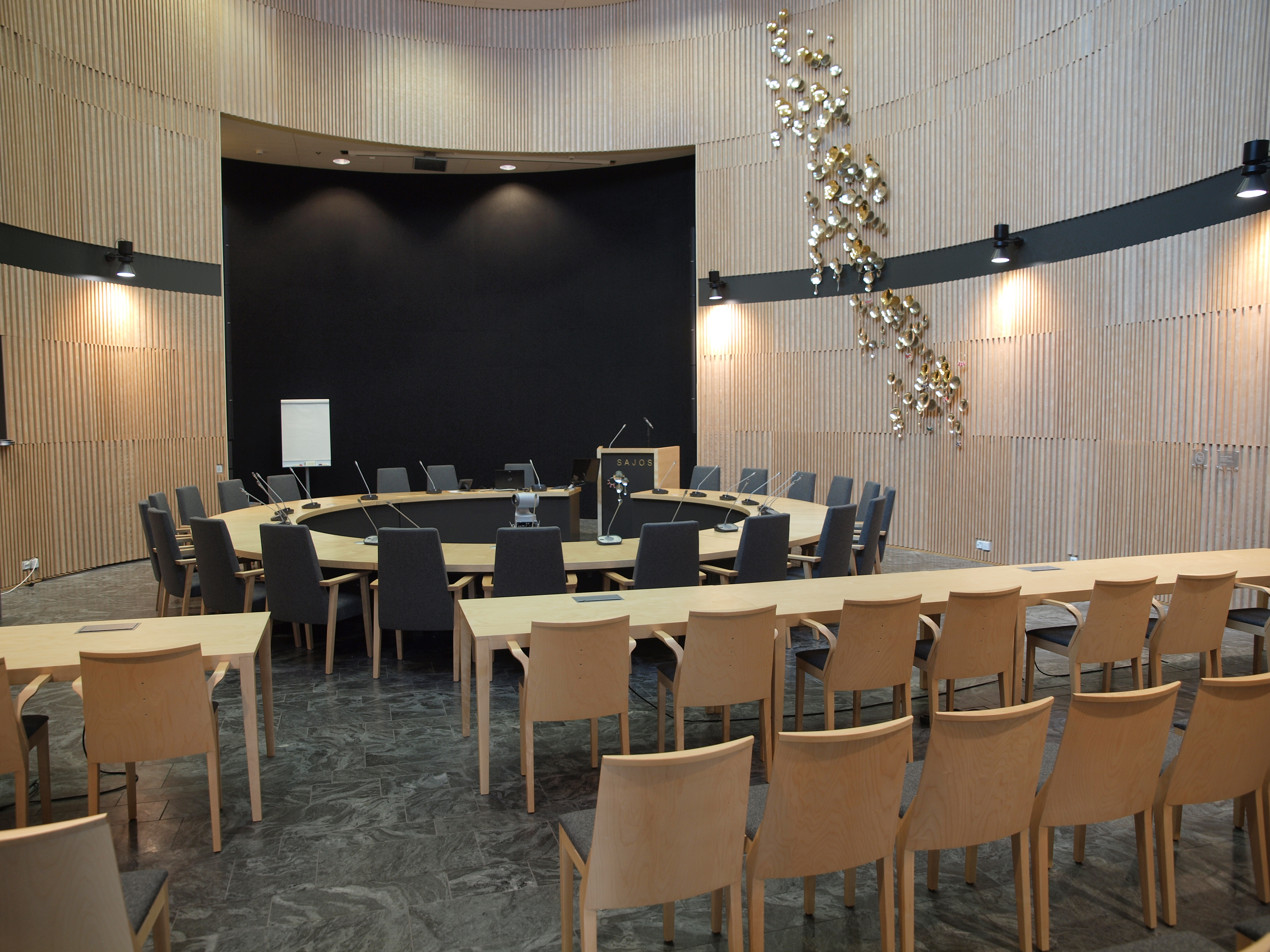
The Sami Parliament Chamber

The Finnish Sámi Parliament is located in Sajos in Inari.

== Responsibilities ==
Some of the responsibilities of the Finnish Sámi Parliament include matters related to the languages and culture of the Sámi, and also their status as an indigenous people. The Finnish Sámi Parliament decides on the distribution of the funds it receives that are earmarked for use by the Sámi. It can also sponsor bills and release statements on matters that fall under its jurisdiction.

The Finnish Sámi Parliament is a separate branch of the Ministry of Justice and is an independent legal body subject to public law with its own governing body, accountants as well as auditors.

The parliament has working groups for: education and education material, Sámi livelihood and rights, culture, social issues and health, election, and Sámi language.

The Sami Parliament has an annual budget of about €2 million.

== Voting system ==
The Finnish Sámi Parliament has 21 representatives and four deputy representatives who are elected every four years by postal vote. The four municipalities in the Sámi Domicile Area (Enontekiö, Utsjoki, Inari and Sodankylä) elect three members and one deputy member each, and the remaining nine members are elected from those candidates who received the highest share of the votes (regardless of which municipality they live in, or whether they live outside the Sámi Domicile Area).

Under the Section 3 of the Act on the Sámi Parliament a person is eligible to vote if they consider themselves as a Sámi, and:

- They, or one of their parents or grandparents was native Sámi speaker, or
- They are descended from a person in the mountain, forest, or fisher Lapp Sámi register (tunturi-, metsä tai kalastajalappalaiseksi), or
- At least one of their parents are, was, or could have been, eligible for voting at the Sámi Parliament of 1995 or the Sámi Council of 1973.

== Elections ==
In 2016, the Sámi Parliament sought to hold a new election following the results of the 2015 election, which ran between 7 September and 4 October. The Supreme Administrative Court of Finland ruled that the move to organise a new election was illegal, and the October results stood. Turnout was 51.63%.

2,853 votes were cast in the September 2019 election, which represents turnout of 48.58% of the 5,873 on the Sámi electoral roll. Nine members were re-elected, eight members were elected for the first time and four candidates who had previously been members were elected.

== See also ==
- List of presidents of the Sámi Parliament of Finland
- Sámi parliaments
  - Sámi Parliament of Norway
  - Sámi Parliament of Sweden
  - Sámi Parliament of Russia
- Elections in Finland
