= Sami Bridge =

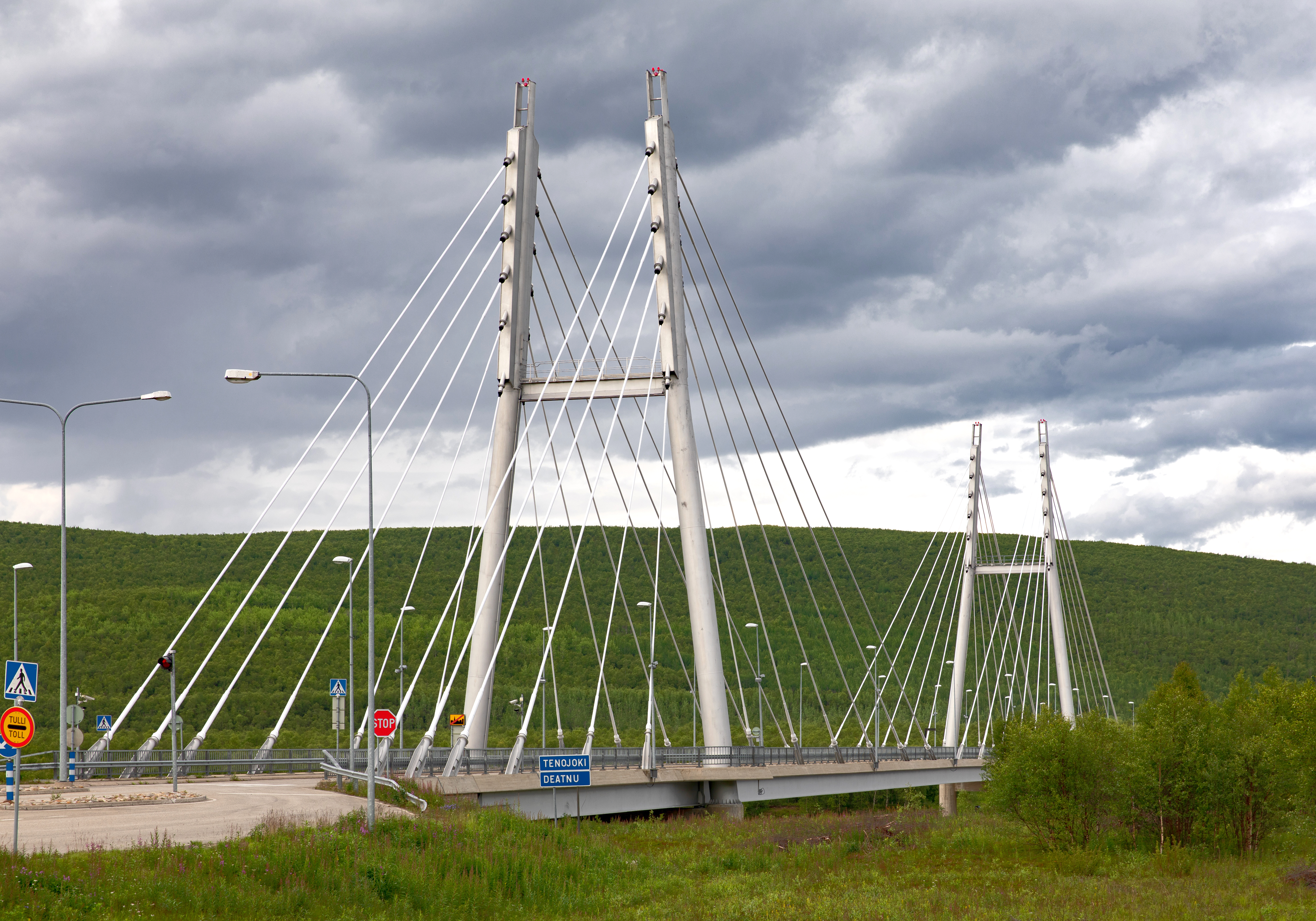
- Sami Bridge seen from the Finnish side
- Coordinates: 69°54′42″N 027°02′01″E
- Carries: E75
- Crosses: Tana River, Finnish–Norwegian border
- Locale: Utsjoki, Finland; Finnmark, Norway
- Official name: Saamen silta Samelandsbrua
- Maintained by: Finnish Transport Agency, Norwegian Public Roads Administration

Characteristics
- Design: cable-stayed tuftform
- Total length: 316 m (1,037 ft)
- Width: 12 m (39 ft)
- Longest span: 155 m (509 ft)

History
- Designer: SuunnitteluKortes
- Opened: 1993

The Sami Bridge (Finnish: Saamen silta; Northern Sami: Sámi šaldi; Norwegian: Samelandsbrua) is a cable-stayed bridge that carries the European route E75 across the Tana River between Finnmark county in Norway and Utsjoki in Finland. The bridge is 316 metres (1,037 ft) long, divided into four spans and the main span is 155 m (509 ft).

The Sami Bridge was opened in 1993. Before this, there was a ferry during summer and ice road in winter.

== See also ==
- List of international bridges
