= Utsjoki =

Utsjoki Utsjoki (Finnish) Ohcejohka (Northern Sami) Uccjuuhâ (Inari Sami) Uccjokk (Skolt Sami)
- Municipality
- Utsjoen kunta (Finnish); Ohcejoga gielda (Northern Sami); Utsjoki kommun (Swedish)
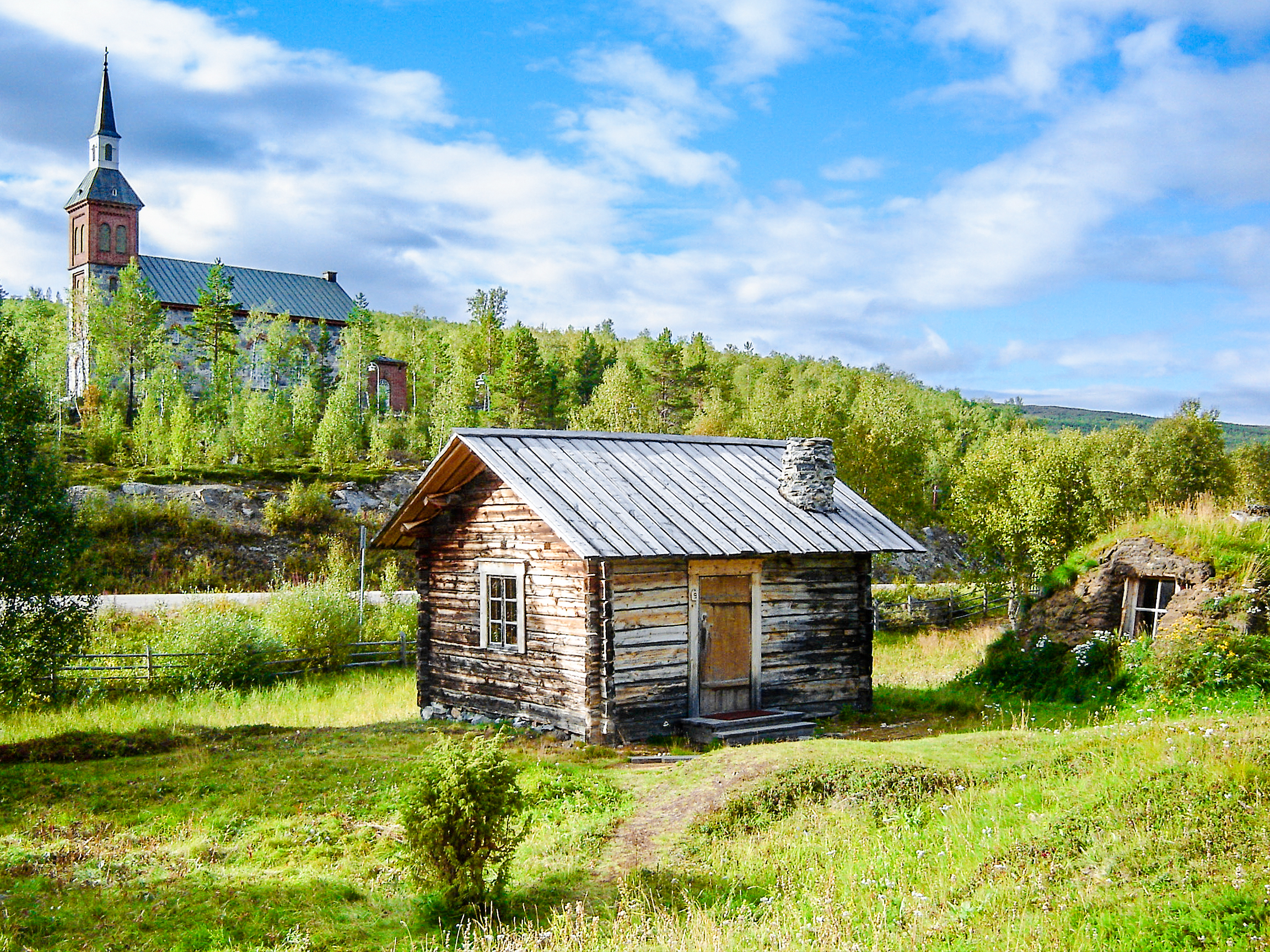
- Utsjoki Church and a log cabin

- Coat of arms

- Location of Utsjoki in Finland
- OpenStreetMap Interactive map outlining Utsjoki.
- Interactive map of Utsjoki
- Coordinates: 69°54′N 027°01′E
- Country: Finland
- Region: Lapland
- Sub-region: Northern Lapland
- Charter: 1876
- Seat: Utsjoen kirkonkylä
- Villages: Karigasniemi, Nuorgam

Government
  - Municipal manager: Vuokko Tieva-Niittyvuopio

Area (2018-01-01)
  - Total: 5,372.00 km^{2} (2,074.14 sq mi)
  - Land: 5,147.16 km^{2} (1,987.33 sq mi)
  - Water: 227.51 km^{2} (87.84 sq mi)
  - Rank: 10th largest in Finland

Population (2025-12-31)
  - Total: 1,112
  - Rank: 289th largest in Finland
  - Density: 0.22/km^{2} (0.57/sq mi)

Population by native language
  - Finnish: 54% (official)
  - Sami: 41.4%
  - Others: 4.5%

Population by age
  - 0 to 14: 12.6%
  - 15 to 64: 56.4%
  - 65 or older: 30.9%
- Time zone: UTC+02:00 (EET)
  - Summer (DST): UTC+03:00 (EEST)
- Website: www.utsjoki.fi

Utsjoki (Finnish: [ˈutsjoki]; Northern Sami: Ohcejohka [ˈoht͡seˌjohka]; Inari Sami: Uccjuuhâ; Skolt Sami: Uccjokk; Norwegian: Utsjok) is a municipality in Finland, the northernmost in the country. It is in Lapland and borders Norway as well as the municipality of Inari. The municipality was founded in 1876. It has a population of 1,112 (31 December 2025) and covers an area of 5,372.00 square kilometres (2,074.14 sq mi) of which 227.51 km^{2} (87.84 sq mi) is water. The population density is 0.22 inhabitants per square kilometre (0.57/sq mi).

Utsjoki has two official languages: Finnish and Northern Sami. It is the municipality in Finland with the largest portion of official Sami speakers; 41.4% of the population. Ethnically, 54.6% of the population were Sami in 2019, making Utsjoki the only municipality in Finland with a Sami majority.

The border with Norway follows the river Teno, which flows into the Arctic Sea. The northernmost village in Finland and in the European Union is Nuorgam.

Utsjoki is at the northern end of highway 4, the longest highway in Finland. The European route E75 runs along the Sami Bridge and continues on to Norway.

The Kevo nature reserve is located within the municipality. It covers a territory of 712 km^{2} (275 sq mi) and there is a 63 km (39 mi) hiking trail. The trail partly follows the edge of the Kevo gorge.

== Etymology ==
Originally, the name referred to a Sami village (siida) that extended north of the Teno river. Historical records include spellings such as Utzureka (1517), Utziuckei (1590), and Usioki (1603).

The meaning and origin of the prefix Ohce- (as in the Northern Sami Ohcejohka) are unknown. The suffix -johka, -juuhâ translates to 'river'. The Finnish name Utsjoki is likely a loan from Inari Sami Uccjuuhâ.

The Inari Sami prefix Ucc- resembles the word 'small' (uccâ), leading to a common folk etymology. However, linguists consider this incorrect because it contradicts the Northern Sami form and the large size of the actual river. In contrast, the Utsjoki river in Savukoski is likely based on the word for 'small'.

== Geography ==
=== Villages ===
- Nuorgam
- Utsjoki centre
- Nuvvus
- Dalvadas
- Outakoski
- Rovisuvanto
- Karigasniemi
- Kaamasmukka

=== Topography ===
The Utsjoki region is flatter and lower in altitudes than many other parts of Lapland. Large areas of Utsjoki are less than 300 m above sea level. Many of the fell summits are under 500 m in height. In general, the topography is smooth and the fells slope gently. The summits are very flat and large, as is typical of old peneplain surfaces.

=== Vegetation ===
In general, the tree line is located at altitudes between 300 and 400 meters. In northernmost Finland, the tree line on north-facing slopes is just above an altitude of 100 meters. Heaths extend above the tree line. The lower heathlands are dominated by shrubs such as dwarf birch, blueberry and crowberry, whereas the fells, at higher elevations, have dwarf willows and alpine grasses with lichens and mosses. On the fell tops, blockfields and windblown heaths with lichens and mosses as well as bare rock slabs are found. Patterned ground occurs regularly, often as polygons and stone stripes on the slopes.

=== Climate ===
The midnight sun remains above the horizon from 17 May to 28 July (73 days), and the polar night from 26 November to 15 January (51 days). Utsjoki, like most of Finland, has a subarctic climate (Köppen Dfc, Trewartha Eclc. Being the northernmost municipality in Finland, Utsjoki's annual average temperature is below freezing. Utsjoki is also the driest place in Finland, as the average annual precipitation varies between 371 and 433 mm, depending on the topography. The driest year on record was 1986, when only 234 mm of precipitation fell at the Outakoski weather station.

Extremely low temperatures and low precipitation result in thin snow cover throughout the winters. The wind velocity strongly increases with higher elevations, and this has a major effect on the distribution of the snow. The exposed hilltops usually have no snow cover during winter. This leads to the cooling of the ground and the development of permafrost.

=== Permafrost ===
Palsas are a typical permafrost feature in northern Finland. Permafrost formation in palsas is dictated by the properties of peat. Dry peat is a good insulator during the summer heat, but frozen peat in winter conducts heat outwards, and the winter frost can penetrate deep into the peat layers. Due to these physical properties, palsas may be formed and preserved even in a climate where the mean annual air temperature is just at the freezing point.

Permafrost has been found in many palsa mires in the Kevo and Utsjoki regions. After detailed studies on palsas, researchers were convinced until 1982 that "so far, permafrost has been found, and probably exists only, in mires in the cores of palsas". The permafrost core in palsas is easy to detect by digging or sounding with a steel rod, and the frozen ground necessitates modern geophysical techniques for geoelectrical soundings. They allow measurement of the thickness of frozen bedrock due to its higher specific electrical resistance.

Matti Seppälä (1941-2020) was undoubtedly the foremost expert on palsas. Based on existing innovative research in Scandinavia he suggested to look for the general permafrost distribution in the mountains also in northernmost Finland. The field campaign in summer 1985 in Utsjoki was supported by the Academy of Finland, the University of Helsinki and the German Research Foundation. The results were quite surprising for most scientists in Finland. Above the timber line, a minimum permafrost thickness of ten to fifty meters was recorded with geoelectrical soundings.

The Puollamoaivi mountain (432 m high) is located some 13 km NE of the Kevo Subarctic Research Station. Close to the Skallovarri palsa mire about 290 m a. s. I., an estimated permafrost thickness of over 100 meters may be expected at an altitude of 360 m, just 30–70 m higher than the surface of the palsa mire. It is concluded therefore that all sites on the crest of Skallovarri (Puollamoaivi) show the existence of permafrost, but its thickness seems to be different. These findings were confirmed with similar results in the adjacent Peldojoki, Hietatievat, Peera sites, where permafrost exists in debris as well as in bedrock. This is also of importance in the construction business, e.g. for deep foundations for telecommunication masts.

Climate data for Utsjoki Kevo (1991–2020 normals, records 1962–present)
Month	Jan	Feb	Mar	Apr	May	Jun	Jul	Aug	Sep	Oct	Nov	Dec	Year
Record high °C (°F)	6.2 (43.2)	6.5 (43.7)	9.2 (48.6)	15.7 (60.3)	30.5 (86.9)	32.5 (90.5)	33.6 (92.5)	31.5 (88.7)	24.3 (75.7)	13.7 (56.7)	11.5 (52.7)	7.1 (44.8)	33.6 (92.5)
Mean maximum °C (°F)	2.1 (35.8)	2.2 (36.0)	4.3 (39.7)	9.5 (49.1)	18.4 (65.1)	24.6 (76.3)	27.4 (81.3)	24.5 (76.1)	17.9 (64.2)	9.7 (49.5)	3.4 (38.1)	2.9 (37.2)	28.3 (82.9)
Mean daily maximum °C (°F)	−8.6 (16.5)	−8.0 (17.6)	−2.8 (27.0)	2.8 (37.0)	8.5 (47.3)	14.7 (58.5)	18.7 (65.7)	16.0 (60.8)	10.4 (50.7)	2.4 (36.3)	−3.7 (25.3)	−6.1 (21.0)	3.7 (38.6)
Daily mean °C (°F)	−13.3 (8.1)	−12.6 (9.3)	−7.8 (18.0)	−1.9 (28.6)	4.2 (39.6)	9.8 (49.6)	13.4 (56.1)	11.1 (52.0)	6.4 (43.5)	−0.4 (31.3)	−7.2 (19.0)	−10.6 (12.9)	−0.7 (30.7)
Mean daily minimum °C (°F)	−18.3 (−0.9)	−17.6 (0.3)	−13.3 (8.1)	−6.9 (19.6)	−0.1 (31.8)	5.3 (41.5)	8.7 (47.7)	6.9 (44.4)	2.9 (37.2)	−3.2 (26.2)	−11.2 (11.8)	−15.3 (4.5)	−5.2 (22.7)
Mean minimum °C (°F)	−35.1 (−31.2)	−34.3 (−29.7)	−28.0 (−18.4)	−21.8 (−7.2)	−7.6 (18.3)	0.2 (32.4)	3.4 (38.1)	0.2 (32.4)	−3.9 (25.0)	−15.5 (4.1)	−24.8 (−12.6)	−30.7 (−23.3)	−37.4 (−35.3)
Record low °C (°F)	−48.2 (−54.8)	−47.9 (−54.2)	−39.1 (−38.4)	−31.9 (−25.4)	−20.9 (−5.6)	−3.4 (25.9)	−0.1 (31.8)	−3.9 (25.0)	−11.9 (10.6)	−28.9 (−20.0)	−36.1 (−33.0)	−41.4 (−42.5)	−48.2 (−54.8)
Average precipitation mm (inches)	26 (1.0)	25 (1.0)	21 (0.8)	22 (0.9)	30 (1.2)	56 (2.2)	73 (2.9)	59 (2.3)	38 (1.5)	38 (1.5)	27 (1.1)	28 (1.1)	443 (17.5)
Average precipitation days (≥ 0.1 mm)	21	18	17	15	16	17	18	18	18	20	20	21	219
Average relative humidity (%)	84	83	79	76	71	69	74	81	85	89	89	87	81
Mean monthly sunshine hours	4	47	130	181	193	216	209	127	88	51	9	0	1,255
Source 1: FMI climatological normals for Finland 1991–2020
Source 2: record highs and lows

Climate data for Utsjoki Outakoski, 1981–2010 normals
Month	Jan	Feb	Mar	Apr	May	Jun	Jul	Aug	Sep	Oct	Nov	Dec	Year
Average precipitation mm (inches)	22 (0.9)	20 (0.8)	16 (0.6)	19 (0.7)	17 (0.7)	38 (1.5)	61 (2.4)	54 (2.1)	35 (1.4)	38 (1.5)	29 (1.1)	22 (0.9)	371 (14.6)
Source: FMI open data, 1981–2010

== Demographics ==
In 2025, the population of Utsjoki was 1,127. This makes Utsjoki the 19th least populated municipality in Finland.

=== Age ===
In 2021, 56.4% of the population was aged between 15 and 64, while 30.9% were over 65 and 12.6% were under 15.

=== Ethnic groups ===
As of 2019, 54.6% of the population of Utsjoki was Sámi, making it the only municipality in the entire country with a Sámi majority.

=== Languages ===
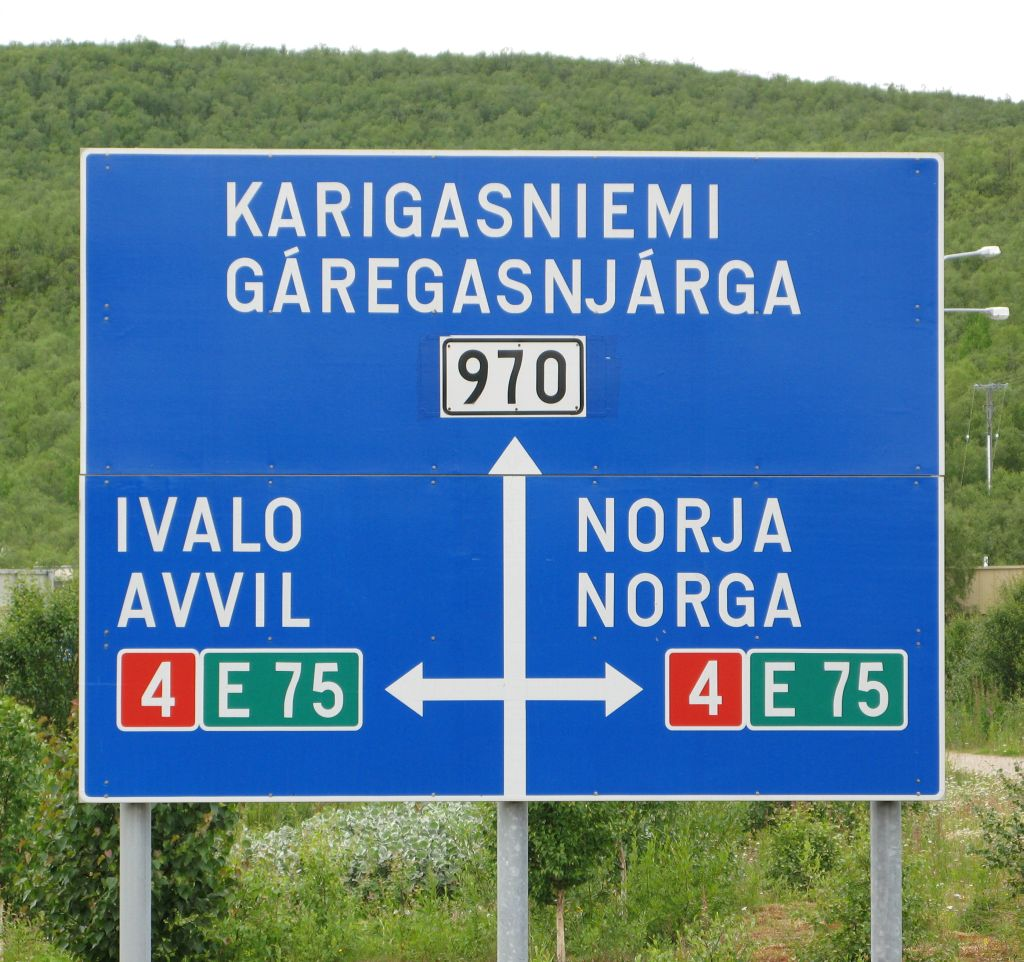
A bilingual road sign in Utsjoen kirkonkylä, in Finnish first and Northern Sámi second. Both languages have official status in Utsjoki.

As of 2024, 54.3% of the population of Utsjoki spoke Finnish as their native language, while 41.6% spoke Sámi languages (the highest proportion in the country) and 4.1% spoke other languages.

== Notable people ==
- Inger-Mari Aikio-Arianaick, writer, born in Utsjoki in 1961
- Pigga Keskitalo, Sámi academic, born in Utsjoki in 1972
- Helvi Poutasuo (1943–2017), teacher, translator, editor, politician
- Irja Seurujärvi-Kari (born 1947), politician and academic

== Gallery ==
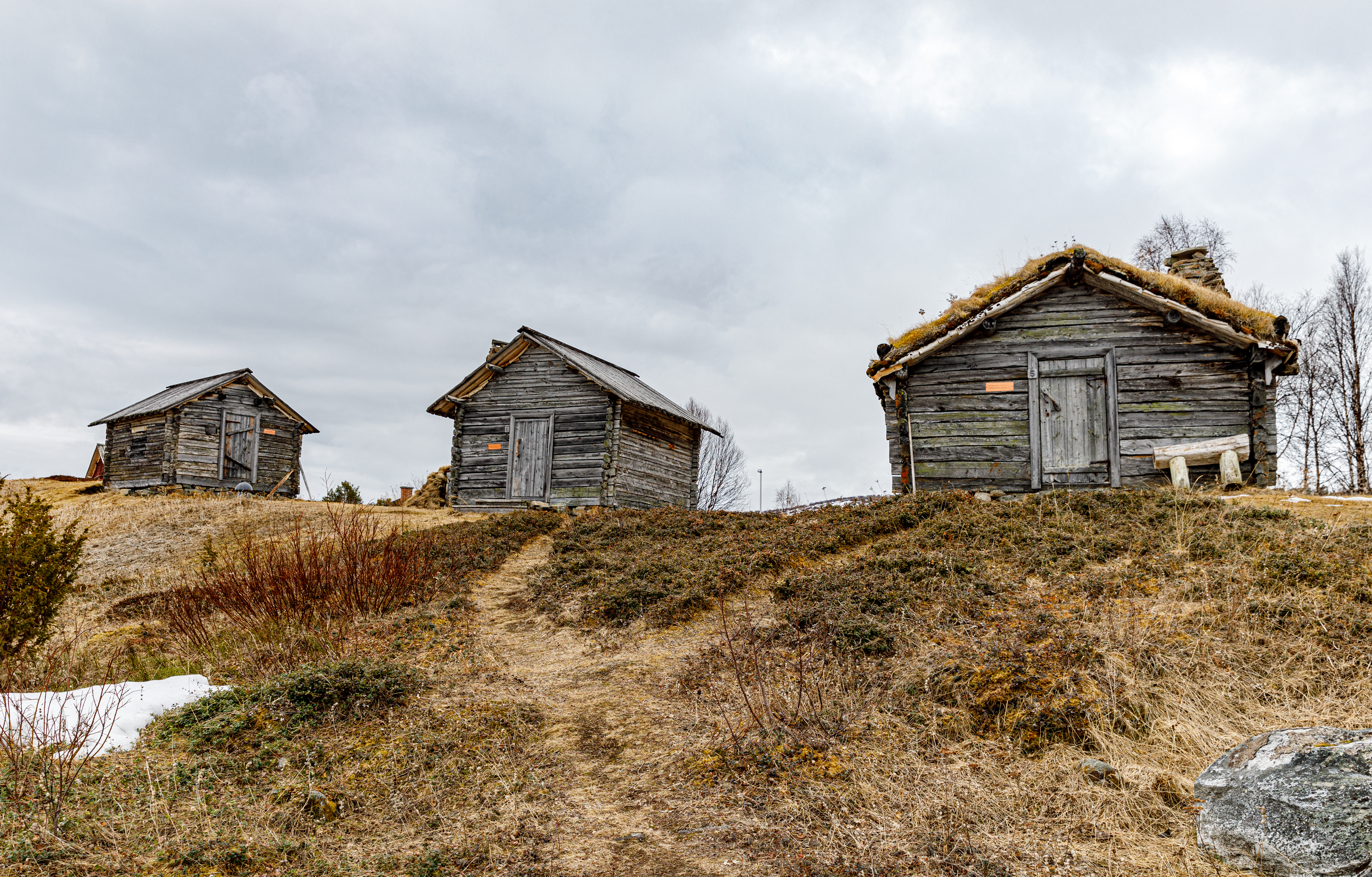
Old cabins on the hill

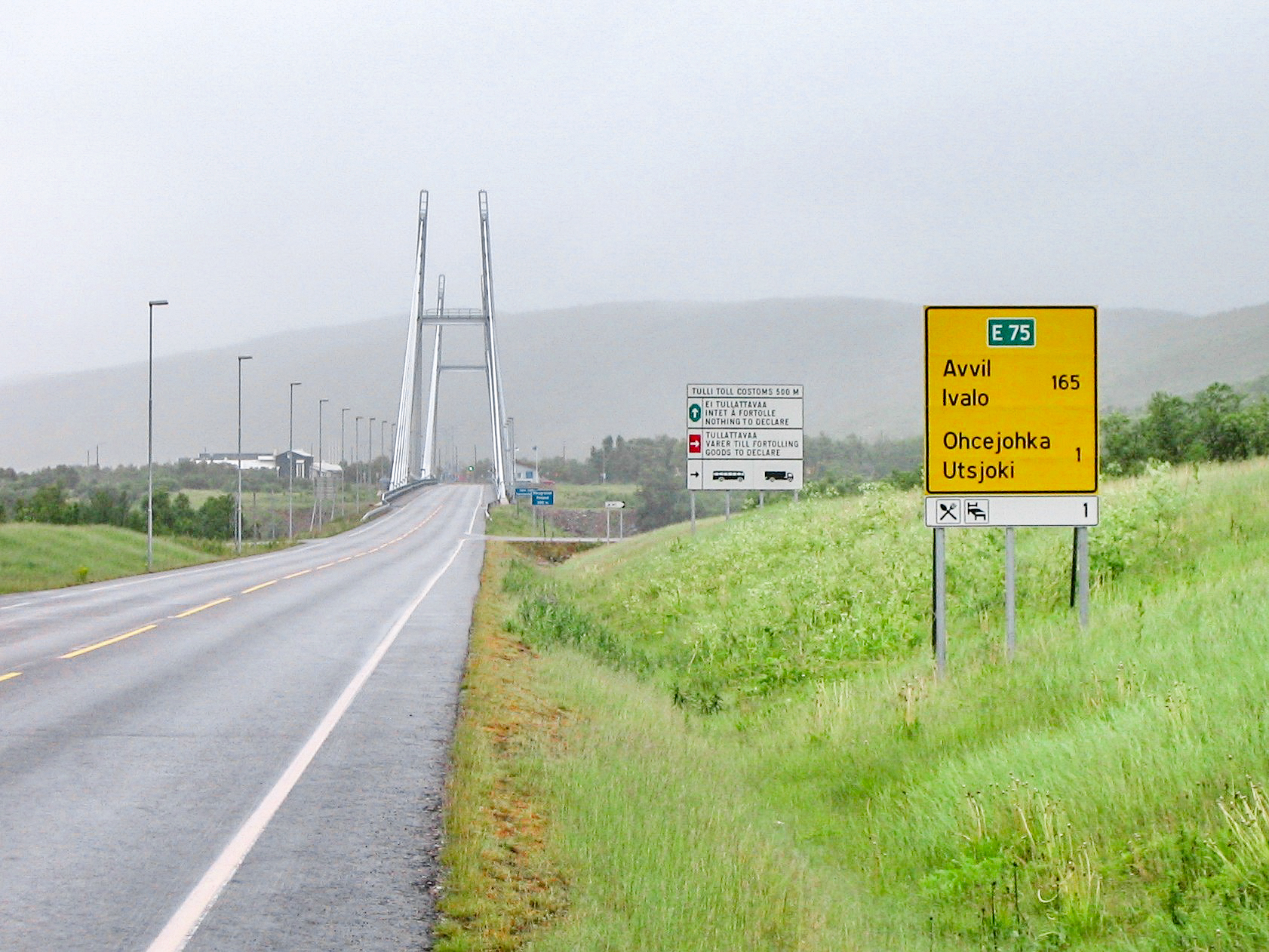
Utsjoki seen from Norway

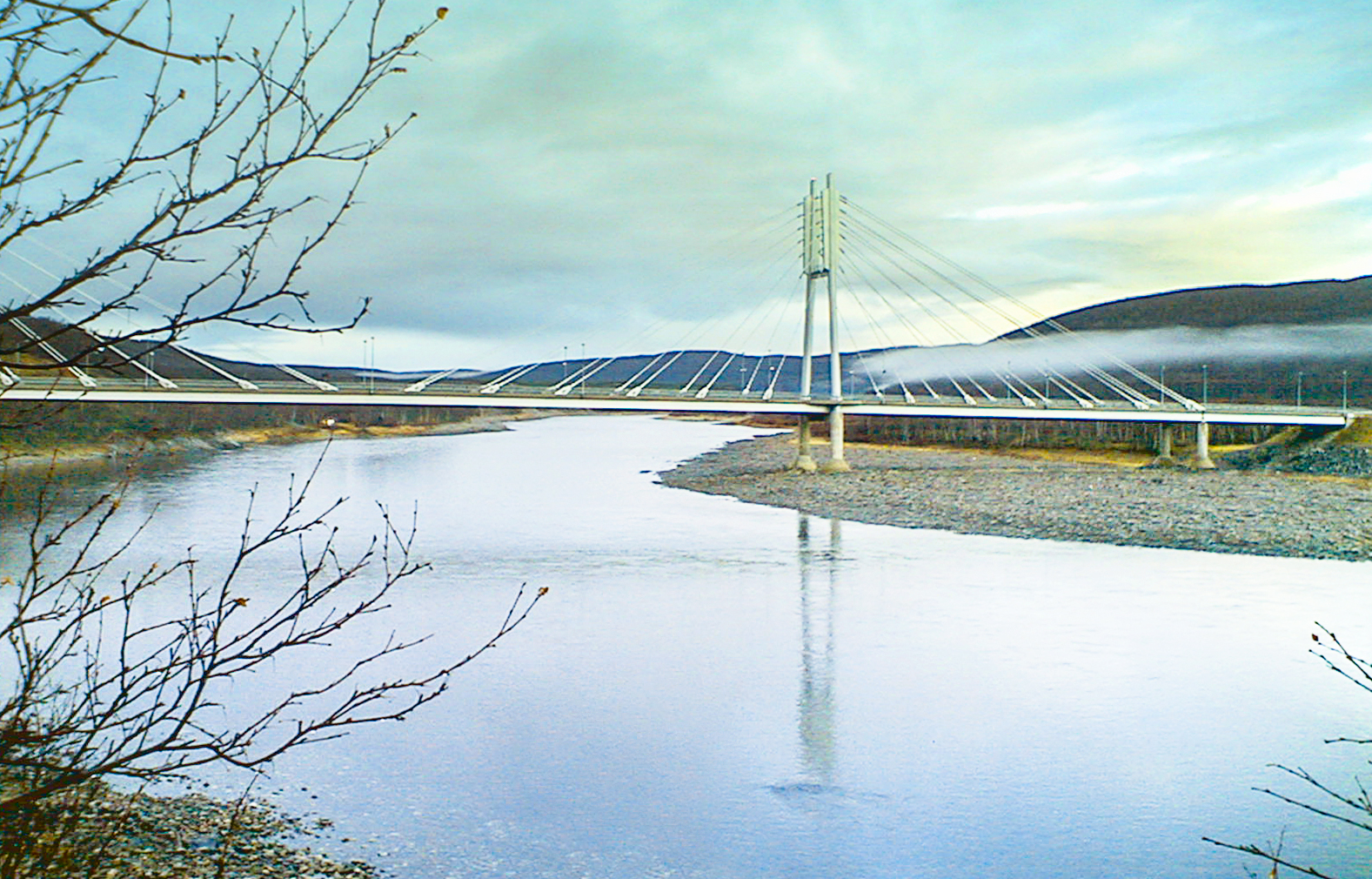
The Sami Bridge connects Utsjoki to Norway

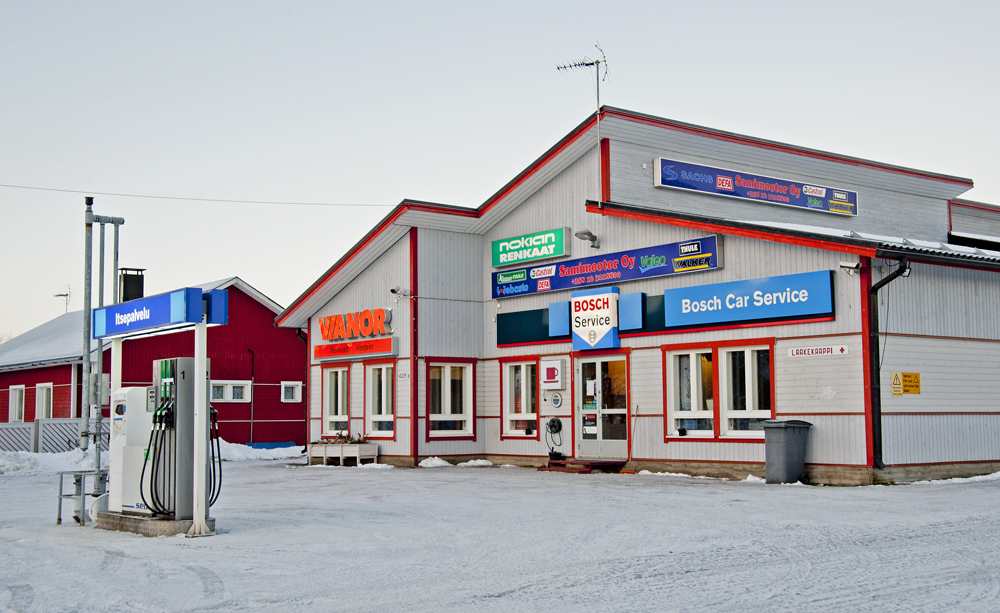
Samimootor, a car repair shop and filling station in Nuorgam, Utsjoki

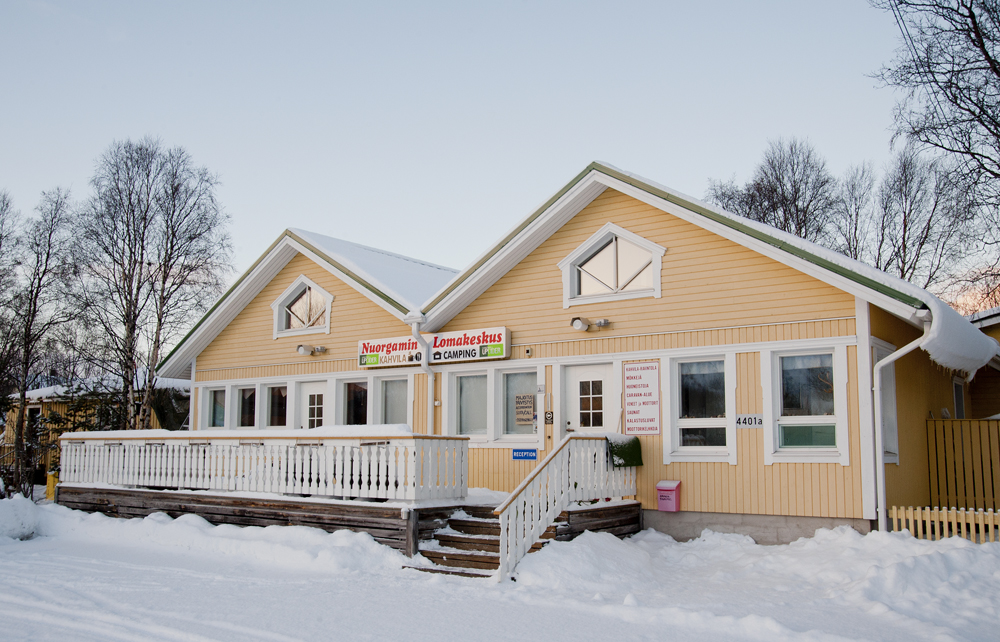
Nuorgamin lomakeskus, the camping center of Nuorgam
