= Alexandrovsky Uyezd, Arkhangelsk Governorate =

Administrative divisions of Kolsky Uyezd in 1883
- Volosts: 1. Kolsko-Loparskaya; 2. Kuzomenskaya; 3. Murmansko-Kolonistskaya; 4. Ponoyskaya; 5. Tetrinskaya; 6. Umbskaya

Alexandrovsky Uyezd (Russian: Александровский уезд) was an administrative division (an uyezd) of Arkhangelsk Governorate of the Russian Empire and later of the Russian SFSR.

The origins of Alexandrovsky Uyezd trace back to Kolsky Uyezd, which existed on this territory since the early 16th century until December 13 [O.S. December 2], 1858, when Tsar Alexander II approved a State Council opinion "On Changing the Governance in the Town of Kola and in Kolsky Uyezd" that Kolsky Uyezd be abolished and its territory merged into Kemsky Uyezd.

Kolsky Uyezd was restored on February 19 [O.S. February 8], 1883 when Tsar Alexander III approved a new opinion of the State Council, although the territory of the restored uyezd was smaller than its pre-1858 territory—it included only the 4th and the 5th stans of Kemsky Uyezd. The town of Kola once again became the administrative center of the uyezd.

On June 20 [O.S. June 7], 1899, the village of Alexandrovsk was granted the status of an uyezd town, for which reason the uyezd was renamed Alexandrovsky.

On January 14 [O.S. January 1], 1912, new Teriberskaya Volost was created from a part of Kolsko-Loparskaya Volost.

Administrative divisions of Alexandrovsky Uyezd in 1917

(Administrative centers are given in parentheses)
- Volosts: 1. Kolsko-Loparskaya (town of Kola); 2. Kuzomenskaya (selo of Kuzomen); 3. Murmansko-Kolonistskaya (selo of Pechenga and Barkino colony); 4. Ponoyskaya (selo of Ponoy); 5. Teriberskaya (camp of Teriberka); 6. Tetrinskaya (selo of Tetrino); 7. Umbskaya (selo of Umba)
- Towns: 1. Alexandrovsk; 2. Kola; 3. Murmansk

When the White movement controlled the northwest of Russia in 1918–1920, Alexandrovsky Uyezd was included into Northern Oblast. By 1920 (the exact date is unknown), Murmansko-Kolonistskaya Volost of the uyezd was renamed Pechengskaya (Печенгская); after Pechenga, where the volost government was located. On February 2, 1920, Murmansk Governorate was established by the Resolution of the Provisional Government of Northern Oblast; it included the territory of Alexandrovsky Uyezd. The uyezd, however, was restored in its 1917 borders after Murmansk Governorate was abolished effective February 21, 1920 when the Soviet power was restored on the Kola Peninsula.

In February 1920, according to the provisions of the first Constitution of the Russian SFSR, the process of creating selsoviets started in the uyezd. While the Constitution and the auxiliary Resolution on the Selsoviets specified that the populations of the selsoviets should not be fewer than three hundred people, this requirement proved impractical in the uyezds where small villages were scattered within large distances from one another. Thus, many selsoviets were created despite the insufficient population counts and gradually started to replace the volosts as the lowest unit of the administrative-territorial division.

On March 24, 1920, the 1st Congress of Alexandrovsky Uyezd Soviets made a decision to rename the uyezd Murmansky (Му́рманский), as Murmansk served as the uyezd's center. On April 13, Arkhangelsk Governorate Executive Committee approved the new name during a plenary session. However, the decision was not approved by the All-Russian Central Executive Committee and for the next fifteen months the uyezd was referred to by both names.

On April 22, 1920 the Soviet of the town of Alexandrovsk suggested that several colonies of Teriberskaya Volost should be incorporated into a new volost, called Alexandrovskaya. The proposal was formally approved by the Murmansky Uyezd Executive Committee on June 1, 1920. The administrative center of the new volost was in Alexandrovsk.

In the beginning of 1921, as a result of the Treaty of Tartu signed between Russia and Finland on October 14, 1920, the western portion of Pechengskaya Volost along with the portions of Kolsko-Loparskaya Volost were ceded to Finland, with Russia abandoning all future rights and claims to these territories. On April 7, 1921, an assembly of representatives of various Soviet organizations transformed the remaining part of Pechengskaya Volost into new Novozerskaya Volost.

On June 13, 1921, a Decree issued by the All-Russian Central Executive Committee transformed Alexandrovsky Uyezd into Murmansk Governorate.
