= Coat of arms of Kola =

Symbol of a town in Murmansk, Russia

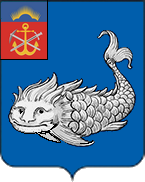
Coat of arms of Kola (2016)

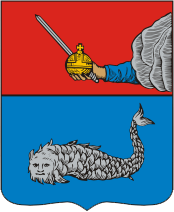
Coat of arms of Kola (1780)

The coat of arms was granted to the town of Kola, as well as to other towns of Vologda Viceroyalty, by the October 13 [O.S. October 2], 1780 decree (ukase) of Catherine II "On the coat of arms of Vologda Viceroyalty".

The upper part of the shield depicts a hand in the red field, stretching out from a cloud and holding a golden orb with a silver sword (a coat of arms of Vologda Viceroyalty). The lower part of the shield depicts a whale—a species in hunting of which the town residents specialize.

In 1780, Kola was the administrative center of Kolsky Uyezd of Arkhangelsk Oblast of Vologda Viceroyalty. When Arkhangelsk Oblast was re-organized into Arkhangelsk Viceroyalty by Catherine II's decree on April 6 [O.S. March 26], 1784, Kolsky Uyezd became a part of it as well. Kola's coat of arms was soon modified accordingly—the coat of arms of Vologda Viceroyalty in the upper part was replaced with the coat of arms of Arkhangelsk Viceroyalty (in the golden field, an archangel defeats a devil with a fiery sword and a shield). The date of this modification is unknown, but supposedly it was done in 1784.

During Soviet times, the old coat of arms fell out of use. In 1965, an emblem depicting a dam of a hydro-electric power station, an Arctic fox, a cog wheel, a spike, and lettering spelling "Kola" in the blue field, and a whale in a blue field in the lower part of the shield was proposed, but it had never been officially adopted. Nevertheless, a pin badge depicting this emblem was produced in the 1980s, creating a false impression that the emblem was the official coat of arms.

The modern coat of arms of Kola was adopted on August 7, 1991 and mirrors the 1781 coat of arms.
