= Umbskaya Volost =

Umbskaya Volost (Russian: Умбская волость) was an administrative division (a volost) of the Novgorod Republic and later of the Grand Duchy of Moscow, Tsardom of Russia, the Russian Empire, and the Russian SFSR. Its seat was in Umba.

The volost was established by the Novgorodians in the second half of the 15th century. It was lost by the Novgorod Republic to the Grand Duchy of Moscow after the Battle of Shelon in 1471.

In the 16th century, most of the Kola Peninsula's territory was under the administration of Kolsky Uyezd. Umbskaya and Varzuzhskaya Volosts were the only territories of the peninsula which were a part of Dvinsky Uyezd.

In 1784, when Arkhangelsk Oblast of Vologda Viceroyalty was transformed into Arkhangelsk Viceroyalty, Umbskaya Volost was transferred under the jurisdiction of the new viceroyalty's Kolsky Uyezd. When the viceroyalty was transformed into Arkhangelsk Governorate in 1796, the volost's jurisdiction again changed accordingly.

In 1828, Poryegubskaya Volost was merged into Umbskaya Volost.

The volost was abolished on May 31 [O.S. May 20], 1841, when volosts of Arkhangelsk Governorate's uyezds were enlarged. Umbskaya Volost, along with Varzuzhskaya Volost and the territory of the Terskaya Lapps, became a part of new Kuzomenskaya Volost.

The volost was later restored, and was a part of Kemsky Uyezd of Arkhangelsk Governorate in 1883. When Kolsky Uyezd was restored on February 19 [O.S. February 8], 1883, Umbskaya Volost was one of the six volosts transferred to it.

The volost became a part of Murmansk Governorate at the time of its establishment in 1921, and was abolished on August 1, 1927 along with the rest of the volosts of Murmansk Governorate when the latter was transformed into Murmansk Okrug, redistricted, and transferred to the newly created Leningrad Oblast.
