= Kandalakshskaya Volost =

Kandalakshskaya Volost (Russian: Кандала́кшская во́лость) was an administrative division (a volost) over time included into various administrative divisions of the Grand Duchy of Moscow, Russian Empire, and the Russian SFSR.

In the 17th–18th centuries, the volost was a part of Kolsky Uyezd. In 1828, Knyazhegubskaya Volost was merged into it.

On May 31 [O.S. May 20], 1841, all volosts in the uyezds of Arkhangelsk Governorate were enlarged. In Kolsky Uyezd, only two volosts remained: Kandalakshskaya Volost, together with Keretskaya Volost, were abolished and became a part of Kovdskaya Volost. Due to the decline of the town of Kola, caused by a British ship bombardment in 1854, Kolsky Uyezd itself was abolished and its territory merged into Kemsky Uyezd on December 13 [O.S. December 2], 1858, when Tsar Alexander II approved a State Council opinion "On Changing the Governance in the Town of Kola and in Kolsky Uyezd".

In 1886, Kandalakshskaya Volost restored when it was split from Kovdskaya Volost; both volosts remained in Kemsky Uyezd.

By the Decree of the All-Russian Central Executive Committee and the Council of People's Commissars of August 4, 1920, Kandalakshskaya and Kovdskaya Volosts were transferred to the Karelian Labor Commune. However, since the volost had stronger economic ties with nearby Murmansk than with Petrozavodsk (the administrative center of the Karelian Labor Commune), on February 6, 1921 the people's assembly unanimously voted to transfer the volost to Murmansky Uyezd. The results of the vote were considered when a project of the division of the governorate into districts was developed by the Murmansk Governorate Statistics Bureau and the Economics Council of the Governorate, but the project itself was declined. The population of the volost approved the transfer of the volost to Murmansk Governorate once again during the peasant conference held on February 10, 1924, and the vote was also taken into account when a new redistricting project was submitted for consideration later that year, but that project was not approved either. More proposals were submitted in 1926, but were similarly declined.

In 1927, the Karelian ASSR (into which the Karelian Labor Commune was transformed in 1923) was divided into districts, which replaced the old volosts. Kandalakshskaya Volost was abolished by the Resolution of the All-Russian Central Executive Committee of August 29, 1927 and its territory, along with the territory of Kovdskaya Volost and with the village of Kyurela of Kestengskaya Volost formed Kandalashsky District (which remained a part of the Karelian ASSR).
