= Varzuga (rural locality) =

Varzuga Варзуга
- Selo
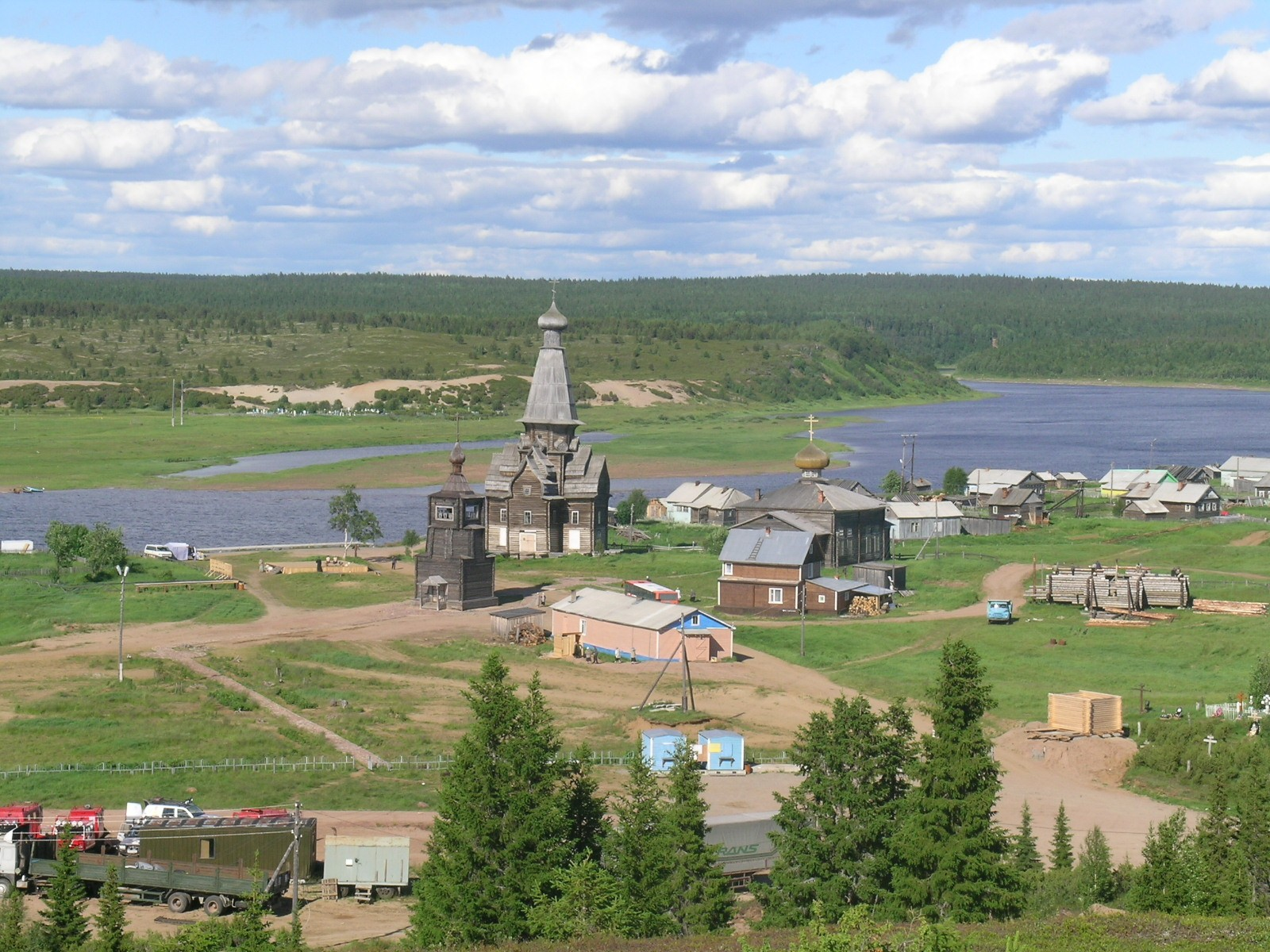
- View of Varzuga

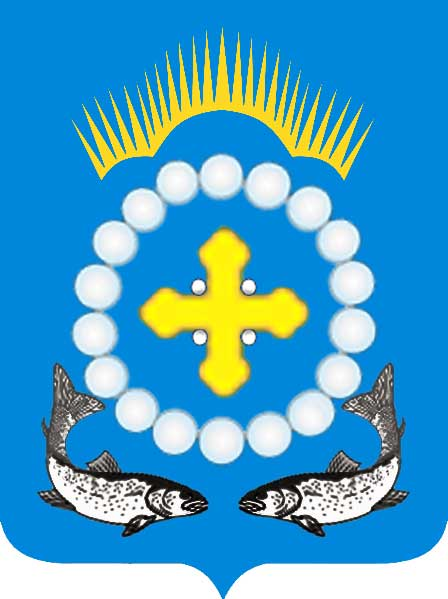
- Coat of arms
- Interactive map of Varzuga
- Location of Varzuga Varzuga (Murmansk Oblast)
- Coordinates: 66°23′57″N 36°35′32″E
- Country: Russia
- Federal subject: Murmansk Oblast
- Administrative district: Tersky District
- First mentioned: 1466
- Elevation: 52 m (171 ft)

Population (2010 Census)
  - Total: 363
  - Estimate (2021): 237 (−34.7%)

Municipal status
  - Municipal district: Tersky Municipal District
  - Rural settlement: Varzuga Rural Settlement
  - Capital of: Varzuga Rural Settlement
- Time zone: UTC+3 (MSK)
- Postal code: 184712
- OKTMO ID: 47620401101

Varzuga (Russian: Варзуга) is the rural locality (a selo) in Tersky District of Murmansk Oblast, Russia, located on the Varzuga River. Municipally, it is a part and the administrative center of Varzuga Rural Settlement of Tersky Municipal District. Population: 363 (2010 Census).

== History ==
First mentioned in 1466, Varzuga, along with Umba, is the first documented permanent Russian settlement on the Kola Peninsula, although it is likely that it had been established as early as the second quarter of the 15th century. The 1466 document describes a transaction between Timofey Yermolinich, a resident of Varzuga, and the Solovetsky Monastery, to which he transferred his lands along the Varzuga River and the hunting grounds along the sea coast. Other documents of the 1460s indicate that the residents of Varzuga were the second generation of the original Russian settlers. The documents refer to the residents' land plots as otchinas, meaning that they were inherited from the fathers, but there is no mention of dedinas (lands inherited from the grandfathers).

From the second half of the 15th century, it served as the seat of Varzuzhskaya Volost (which was abolished in 1841).

By 1563, Varzuga's population grew to 124 homesteads, who were primarily salmon fishers. In the mid-17th century, some of the residents moved out to the coast, where they founded new villages, such as Kuzomen and Tetrino.

In 1861, Varzuga was a part of Kemsky Uyezd of Arkhangelsk Governorate. It had three Orthodox churches and housed its own rural government. The population was 249 (120 male and 129 female); living in 54 homesteads. The 1897 Census counted 793 residents, and the population grew further. By 1910, there were 1,001 people living in 161 homesteads. Educational facilities at the time included a government college and a parochial school.

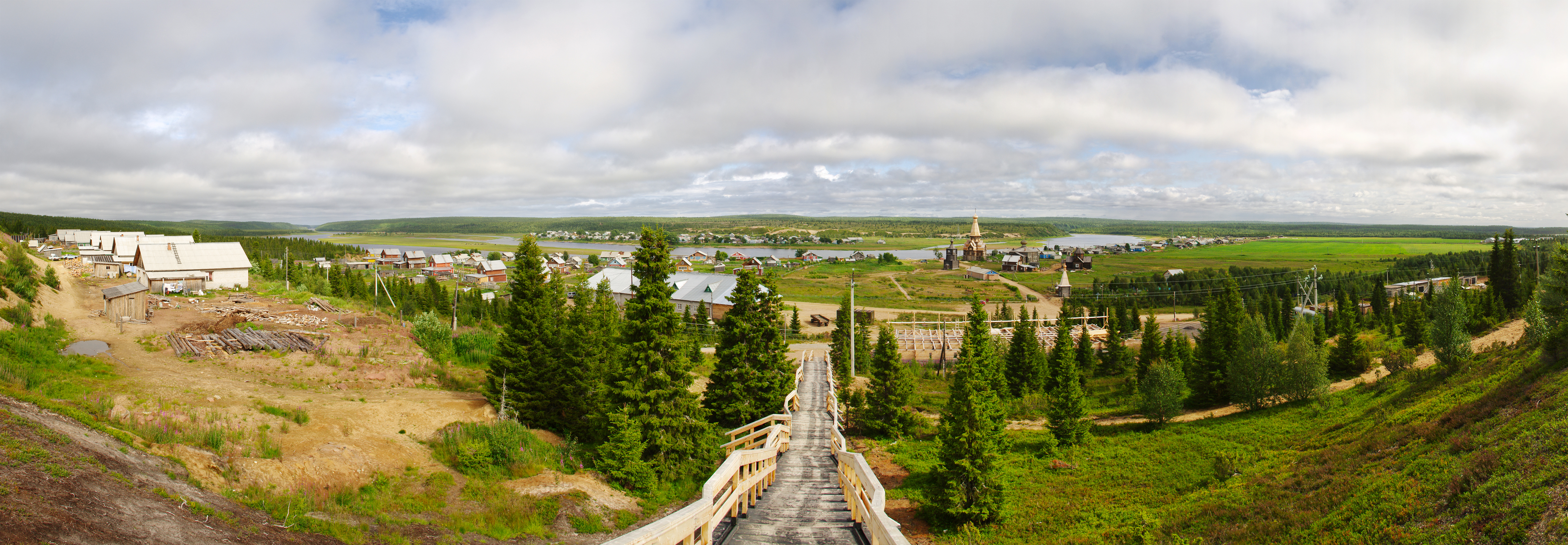
Village panorama

== Architectural heritage ==
Varzuga is known primarily for the wooden church of the Dormition of the Theotokos (Uspenskaya) which sits on the right bank of the Varzuga River. This tent-roofed church, like many in the Russian North, was built “without a single nail.” Constructed in 1674, the main structure rises 13 meters, with the additional superstructure reaching 21 meters — a proportion that follows the golden ratio. The church’s layout forms an equilateral cross, with 70 square meters dedicated to worshippers. Its iconostasis, featuring 84 icons, was consecrated on August 3, 1677, three years after the church’s completion. The iconostasis’s intricate wooden carvings, adorned with figures of soaring angels, are particularly striking. The church also boasts a painted ceiling, known as the “sky,” the only one of its kind still preserved in the Murmansk Region. During a 1973 restoration, the upper section of the building was fully replaced. In 1996, the church was returned to the Russian Orthodox Church, and services resumed. The wooden bell tower, built alongside the church in the 17th century but demolished in 1939, was faithfully reconstructed in 2001.

Three later churches — dedicated to Athanasius the Great, Nicholas the Wonderworker, and Peter and Paul — also survive, though the latter two were rebuilt during Soviet times and remain unrestored.

An 1850 Pomor izba located in the village was formerly considered to be a heritage site of federal importance, but was excluded from the list in 1997.

== Sources ==
- Архивный отдел Администрации Мурманской области. Государственный Архив Мурманской области. (1995). Административно-территориальное деление Мурманской области (1920–1993 гг.). Справочник. Мурманск: Мурманское издательско-полиграфическое предприятие "Север".
- Мурманская областная Дума. Закон №545-01-ЗМО от 8 декабря 2004 г. «О статусе, наименованиях и составе территорий муниципального образования Терский район и муниципальных образований, входящих в его состав». Вступил в силу 1 января 2005 г. Опубликован: "Мурманский Вестник", №238, стр. 3, 15 декабря 2004 г. (Murmansk Oblast Duma. Law #545-01-ZMO of December 8, 2004 On the Status, Names, and Composition of the Territories of the Municipal Formation of Tersky District and of the Municipal Formations It Comprises. Effective as of January 1, 2005.).
- Президент Российской Федерации. Указ №452 от 5 мая 1997 г. «Об уточнении состава объектов исторического и культурного наследия федерального (общероссийского) значения». Вступил в силу по истечении 7 дней после дня официального опубликования. Опубликован: "Российская газета", №93-94, 15 мая 1997 г. (President of the Russian Federation. Decree #452 of May 5, 1997 On the Updating of the List of Objects of Historical and Cultural Heritage of the Federal (All-Russian) Importance. Effective as of after 7 days after the official publication date.).
