= Arkhangelsk Province =

Arkhangelsk Province may refer to:

- Arkhangelsk Oblast (est. 1937), a federal subject of Russia
- Arkhangelsk Oblast, Russian Empire (1780–1784), an oblast of Vologda Viceroyalty of the Russian Empire
- Arkhangelsk Viceroyalty (1784–1796), a viceroyalty of the Russian Empire
- Arkhangelsk Governorate (1796–1929), a governorate of the Russian Empire
