= Varzuzhskaya Volost =

Varzuzhskaya Volost (Russian: Варзужская волость) was an administrative division (a volost) of the Novgorod Republic and later of the Grand Duchy of Moscow, Tsardom of Russia, and the Russian Empire. Its seat was in Varzuga.

The volost was established by the Novgorodians in the second half of the 15th century. It was lost by the Novgorod Republic to the Grand Duchy of Moscow after the Battle of Shelon in 1471.

In the 16th century, most of the Kola Peninsula's territory was under the administration of Kolsky Uyezd. Varzuzhskaya and Umbskaya Volosts were the only territories of the peninsula which were a part of Dvinsky Uyezd.

In 1784, when Arkhangelsk Oblast of Vologda Viceroyalty was transformed into Arkhangelsk Viceroyalty, Varzuzhskaya Volost was transferred under the jurisdiction of the new viceroyalty's Kolsky Uyezd. When the viceroyalty was transformed into Arkhangelsk Governorate in 1796, the volost's jurisdiction again changed accordingly.

In 1828, Tetrinskaya slobodka, Pyalitskaya slobodka, and the selo of Ponoy were merged into Varzuzhskaya Volost.

The volost was abolished on May 31 [O.S. May 20], 1841, when volosts of Arkhangelsk Governorate's uyezds were enlarged. Varzuzhskaya Volost, along with Umbskaya Volost and the territory of the Terskaya Lapps, became a part of new Kuzomenskaya Volost.
