= Novozerskaya Volost =

Novozerskaya Volost (Russian: Новозерская волость) was an administrative division (a volost) of Alexandrovsky (Murmansky) Uyezd of Arkhangelsk Governorate and then of Murmansk Governorate of the Russian SFSR.

The volost was established on April 7, 1921 on the portion of the territory of Pechengskaya Volost which remained after the western part of that volost was ceded to Finland by the Treaty of Tartu. The administrative center of the volost was the colony of Ozerko.

By the April 20, 1921 Decision of the Plenary Session of Murmansky Uyezd Executive Committee, the localities of Ara, Ura, and Port-Vladimir were transferred from Novozerskaya to Alexandrovskaya Volost.

The volost became a part of Murmansk Governorate at the time of its establishment in June 1921.

On July 8, 1924, the Presidium of the Murmansk Governorate Executive Committee issued a resolution transferring the pogost of Motovsky to Novozerskaya Volost from Kolsko-Loparskaya Volost. While the resolution was never approved by the All-Russian Central Executive Committee, it was nevertheless implemented in practice.

The volost was abolished on August 1, 1927 along with the rest of the volosts of Murmansk Governorate when the latter was transformed into Murmansk Okrug, redistricted, and transferred to the newly created Leningrad Oblast.
