= Ivan Tomilov =

Ivan Tomilov Russian: Иван Томилов
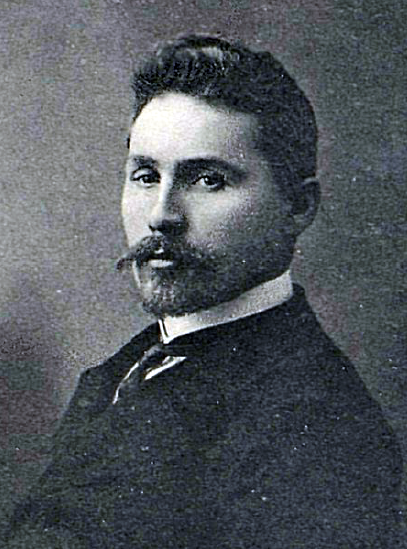
- photo of Tomilov in 1910

Deputy of the Third Imperial Duma
- In office 1 November 1907 – 9 June 1912
- Monarch: Nicholas II

Personal details
- Born: Ivan Semenovich Tomilov; 30 October 1873 Onezhsky Uyezd, Arkhangelsk Governorate, Russian Empire
- Died: 1918
- Party: Constitutional Democratic Party; Trudoviks

Ivan Semenovich Tomilov (Russian: Ива́н Семёнович Томи́лов; 30 October 1873, Arkhangelsk Governorate — 1918, Onega) was a volost clerk and deputy of the Third Imperial Duma from the Arkhangelsk Governorate between 1907 and 1912.

== Biography ==
Ivan Tomilov was born on 30 October 1873 in the village of Zalesye in Prilutskoy volost, located in the Onezhsky Uyezd of the Arkhangelsk Governorate, in a peasant family. Ivan studied at the rural school of Prilutsk; after graduation, he worked in St. Petersburg, while receiving additional commercial education at the same time. Then, in 1899–1900, he worked in Tomsk, where he was a cashier on the Trans-Siberian Railway. From 1901 until his election to parliament, he worked in the excise department in the Arkhangelsk Governorate.

On 19 October 1907, as a non-partisan, but close in political views to the Constitutional Democratic Party, Tomilov was elected to the Third Russian Imperial Duma from the Arkhangelsk Governorate. In the Third Duma, Tomilov first joined the faction of the Constitutional Democratic Party, but then (from the second session) became part of Trudoviks' group. He became a member of a number of Duma commissions. He was one of the most active "signatories" of the Third Duma – along with the other Trudoviks F. O. Kainis and A. E. Kropotov – Tomilov's signature is under a large number of legislative proposals.

During this period of parliamentary work, he was ineligible to attend four Duma meetings on the basis of the 38th article of the parliamentary regulations. After 1917, Tomilov was elected a chairman of the Murmansk Soviet; after that he participated in the work of local government in the town of Onega, where he died in 1918. He was buried in Onega.

== Family ==
As of 1907, Ivan Tomilov was single.

== Literature ==
- Иванов, Б. Ю.; Комзолова, А. А.; Ряховская, И. С., eds. (2008). "Томилов Иван Семенович". Государственная дума Российской империи: 1906—1917 (in Russian). Москва: РОССПЭН. p. 735. ISBN 978-5-8243-1031-3.
- Боиович, М. М., ed. (1913). "Томилов". Члены Государственной Думы (портреты и биографии). Третий созыв. 1907—1912 гг (in Russian). Москва. p. 526.
- Овсянкин, Е. И. (2001). "Томилов Иван Семенович". Поморская энциклопедия: в 5 т. (in Russian). Vol. 1. Архангельск: Поморский государственный университет им. М. В. Ломоносова. p. 483. ISBN 5-88086-147-3.
