= Teriberskaya Volost =

Russian administrative division

Teriberskaya Volost (Russian: Терибе́рская во́лость) was an administrative division (a volost) of Alexandrovsky Uyezd of Arkhangelsk Governorate, Russian Empire (and later of the Russian SFSR), and then of Murmansk Governorate of the Russian SFSR.

It was established on 14 January [O.S. 1 January] 1912, from a part of Kolsko-Loparskaya Volost.

On 22 April 1920 the Soviet of the town of Alexandrovsk proposed to incorporate several colonies of Teriberskaya Volost into new Alexandrovskaya Volost. The proposal was formally approved by Murmansky Uyezd Executive Committee on 1 June 1920.

The volost became a part of Murmansk Governorate at the time of its establishment in 1921, and was abolished on 1 August 1927, along with the rest of the volosts of Murmansk Governorate, when the latter was transformed into Murmansk Okrug, redistricted, and transferred to the newly created Leningrad Oblast.
