= Murmansk Governorate =

1921–1927 unit of Russia

Murmansk Governorate (Russian: Му́рманская губе́рния) was an administrative division (a guberniya) of the early Russian SFSR which existed in 1921–1927. The governorate was established on the territory of former Alexandrovsky Uyezd of Arkhangelsk Governorate by the All-Russian Central Executive Committee (VTsIK) Decree issued on June 13, 1921. The administrative center was in Murmansk.

== Proposals to change the administrative-territorial structure ==
=== 1921 ===
At the time of its creation, the governorate was administratively divided into nine volosts and had three cities and towns. However, just one month after the creation of the governorate, a new project of the administrative-territorial division was proposed at the First Congress of the Governorate Soviets. According to the project, the governorate's territory was to be divided into four uyezds:

- Murmansky, which was to cover the eastern coast of the Arctic Ocean up to the Yokanga River, the area of the Kola Bay excluding Alexandrovsk, and all the areas adjacent to the railroad;
- Ledovity, which was to include the western part of the Murman coast, bordering Finland in the west and Kolsko-Loparskaya Volost in the south;
- Kolsky, which would include the territory of Kolsko-Loparskaya Volost;
- Tersky, which would include the territories of Kuzomenskaya, Ponoyskaya, Tetrinskaya, and Umbskaya Volosts and have the administrative center in Kuzomen.

The proposal, however, was shelved and a special commission was appointed to study the possibilities of changing the administrative-territorial structure of the governorate.

=== 1922–1924 ===
By 1922, the Murmansk Governorate Statistics Bureau and the Economics Council of the Governorate jointly developed a new project of the division of the governorate into districts. The districts were delineated using the economic principles and included:

- Oceanic fishing-based, which consisted of two areas—the western coast of the Kola Peninsula (Alexandrovskaya and Novozerskaya Volosts) and the eastern coast (Teriberskaya Volost)—and had its administrative center in Murmansk. The division into the western and eastern areas took into the consideration the ethnic composition of the population—the population of the western coast was predominantly Finnish while that of the eastern coast was mostly Russian.
- Sea fishing-based, located on the coast of the White Sea south of the Ponoy River. Administratively, it included the territories of Kuzomenskaya, Tetrinskaya, and Umbskaya Volosts. It was also proposed to transfer the eastern portion of Kandalakshskaya Volost of Kemsky Uyezd of Arkhangelsk Governorate to this district, and to make Kandalaksha its administrative center, as the volost's populace voted in 1921 to transfer the volost to Murmansky Uyezd and that de facto they were paying taxes to the Murmansk Department of Finance.
- Timber industry-based, on the territory of Kolsko-Loparskaya Volost. As the territory of the proposed district was to be quite large, it was suggested that it is to be further subdivided into the northern and southern areas.
- Reindeer herding-based, on the territory of Lovozerskaya and Ponoyskaya Volosts. This district was also proposed to be subdivided into two areas: western (all of Lovozerskaya Volost and the territory of Ponoyskaya Volost in the upper streams of the Ponoy River with the administrative center in Lovozero) and eastern (the remaining territory of Ponoyskaya Volost with the administrative center in Ponoy). Reindeer herding was to play major role in the western area, whereas the eastern area, while having some of reindeer herding activity of its own, would primarily specialize in fur trade.
- The fifth district (Belomorsky) was supposed to shape the borders of the governorate more neatly. It was to be composed of the part of the territory of Kemsky Uyezd of the Karelian Labor Commune and of Onezhsky Uyezd of Arkhangelsk Governorate. The district was to be divided into two sub-districts: Kemsko-Sorotsky (comprising Kemskaya, Keretskaya, Kovdskaya, Pongomskaya, Pudozhemskaya, Sorotskaya, and Vychetaybolskaya Volosts of Kemsky Uyezd; with the administrative center in Soroka) and Onezhsky (comprising Kolchachinskaya, Koledomskaya, Kusheretskaya, Lapinskaya, Maloshuyskaya, Nimencheskaya, Nyukhotskaya, Sumskaya, and Vorzogorskaya Volosts, as well as Podporozhskaya Volost with the town of Onega, southwestern portion of Kokorinskaya Volost, and western portions of Mardinskaya, Navolotskaya, Piyalskaya, Posadno-Kirillovskaya, and Prilutskaya Volosts of Onezhsky Uyezd; with the administrative center in Onega).

The project was approved at the session of the Murmansk Governorate Economic Conference on January 2, 1923 and sent for further consideration to the North-Western Economic Conference in Petrograd. There, however, the project was declined, and in 1924 the Murmansk Governorate Planning Commission developed yet another plan to divide the governorate into districts.

The new plan proposed only minor changes to the volost borders. However, it again included a provision to transfer Kandalakshskaya Volost from the Karelian ASSR (into which the Karelian Labor Commune was transformed in 1923) to Murmansk Governorate; as this merger was approved by the volost population once again during the peasant conference on February 10, 1924. The plan was approved by the Presidium of the Murmansk Governorate Executive Committee on July 8, 1924 and forwarded to the administrative commission of the VTsIK. While the VTsIK approved the transfer of some inhabited localities between the volosts; in general the plan was declined and Kandalakshskaya Volost remained a part of the Karelian ASSR.

=== 1925–1927 ===
On January 12, 1925 the VTsIK suspended all work on the changes to the administrative-territorial divisions of the territory of the RSFSR in order to re-group and to improve planning. No changes were proposed until October 16, 1925, when at the Murmansk Governorate Commission meeting work on compiling the lists of the urban and rural localities was initiated. The commission categorized Murmansk, Alexandrovsk, and Kola as urban; however, a recommendation was sent to the VTsIK to demote the latter two to rural localities due to economic conditions, sparse population, low trade volume, lack of industrial enterprises, and "general regress". On March 15, 1926, the VTsIK approved the recommendation, and Murmansk remained the only town on the governorate's territory, while Alexandrovsk and Kola were re-categorized as rural.

The work on the redistricting of the governorate resumed in spring 1926, for which purpose a special Redistricting Commission had been established. At the first meeting on May 17, 1926, the commission decided to transform the governorate into an okrug and suggested two possible redistricting schemes. The first scheme suggested the creation of eight districts with the administrative centers in Alexandrovsk, Kandalaksha, Kola, Kuzomen, Lovozero, Ponoy, Teriberka, and Umba. The other scheme suggested six districts: Alexandrovsky (with the administrative center in Alexandrovsk), Kolsko-Loparsky (Kola), Kandalakshsko-Umbsky (Kandalaksha), Tersky (Kuzomen), Lovozersky (Lovozero), and Teribersky (Teriberka). Both scheme assumed the transfer of Kandalakshskaya Volost to the okrug, so the third scheme, without such a merger, was also proposed as an alternative.

By the summer of 1926, two redistricting projects were refined and offered for consideration. The first project suggested the replacement of the existing nine volosts with six districts, each of which would have a certain economic specialization:

- Zapadny Murmansky, with the administrative center in Alexandrovsk and including the territories of Novozerskaya and Alexandrovskaya Volosts (the latter without Minkinsky Selsoviet). Its specialization was cod fishing. This district was the only one where the ethnic composition of the population was taken into consideration.
- Vostochny Murmansky, with the administrative center in Teriberka and including the territory of Teriberskaya Volost. This district's specialization also was cod fishing.
- Lovozersky, with the administrative center in Lovozero and including the territory of Lovozerskaya Volost. The specialization of this district was deer herding and related industries.
- Kolsky, with the administrative center in Kola and including the territories of Kolsko-Loparskaya Volost and Minkinsky Selsoviet of Alexandrovskaya Volost. The district's industries were mixed, and included deer herding, fresh water fishing, as well as forest and railroad industries.
- Tersky, with the administrative center in Kuzomen and including the territories of Kuzomenskaya, Tetrinskaya, and Umbskaya Volosts. The district specialized mainly in salmon fishing.
- Ponoysky, with the administrative center in Ponoy and including the territory of Ponoyskaya Volost. Despite the fact that the economic activity in this district was similar in nature to Lovozersky and Tersky Districts', Ponoysky District was still to be a separate entity due to its size and remoteness from the administrative centers of other districts.

The second project suggested the incorporation of Kandalakshskaya Volost into the okrug, which would become a separate Kandalakshsky District with the administrative center in Kandalaksha and including additionally the territory of Umbskaya Volost and the southern portion of Kolsko-Loparskaya Volost, namely Yona-Babinsky Selsoviet and a part of Ekostrovsky Selsoviet; the joint territory was then to be divided into three new selsoviets (Babinsky, Khibinsky, and Yensky). Other differences from the first project included the creation of Kuzomensky District with the administrative center in Kuzomen and including the territories of Kuzomenskaya and Tetrinskaya Volosts (as opposed to larger Tersky District suggested by the first project) and a smaller Kolsky District, which, compared to the first project, would cede its southern portion to Kandalakshsky District.

The chairs of the volost executive commissions approved the first project during their meeting on June 25, 1926, but the extended Murmansk Governorate Redistricting Commission made several amendments on July 14, 1926. The names of proposed districts were changed from Zapadny Murmansky to Alexandrovsky, from Vostochny Murmansky to Teribersky, and from Kolsky to Kolsko-Loparsky. Furthermore, Iokangsky Selsoviet of Ponoyskaya Volost was to be included into Teribersky District, and Pyalitsky Selsoviet of Tetrinskaya Volost—into Ponoysky District. The Presidium of the Murmansk Governorate Executive Commission approved this amended project on July 19, 1926, and the Plenary Session of the Murmansk Governorate Executive Commission and the members of the Murmansk City Soviet followed suit on August 3, 1926. However, on April 18, 1927 the Presidium of the Murmansk Governorate Executive Commission changed the scheme yet again, increasing the number of districts to seven:

- Kolsko-Loparsky, on the territory of Kolsko-Loparskaya Volost and Minkinsky Selsoviet of Alexandrovskaya Volost;
- Alexandrovsky, on the territories of Novozerskaya and Alexandrovskaya Volosts; the latter without Minkinsky Selsoviet;
- Teribersky, on the territory of Teriberskaya Volost;
- Ponoysky, on the territory of Ponoyskaya Volost;
- Tersky, on the territories of Kuzomenskaya and Tetrinskaya Volosts;
- Umbsky, on the territory of Umbskaya Volost;
- Lovozersky, on the territory of Lovozerskaya Volost.

The Presidium revised and approved this scheme one last time on May 23, 1927; the number of districts was again reduced to six—Umbsky District was taken off the list with the territory of Umbskaya Volost to be included into Tersky District instead.

== Transformation ==
On August 1, 1927, the VTsIK issued two Resolutions: "On the Establishment of Leningrad Oblast" and "On the Borders and Composition of the Okrugs of Leningrad Oblast". Murmansk Governorate was transformed into Murmansk Okrug (which was divided into six districts) and included into Leningrad Oblast.

== Karelian border issue ==
Until 1923, the border between Murmansk Governorate and the Karelian Autonomous Soviet Socialist Republic was the same as the border between the historical Kemsky and Kolsky Uyezds of Arkhangelsk Governorate established in 1857. Consequently, all of the populated places in the south of Kolsko-Loparskaya Volost were unambiguously a part of Murmansk Governorate. This changed in 1923, when the usage rights for two forest divisions in the south of Murmansk Governorate were passed to the colonization department of the Murman Railway. Since the forest divisions' territories were located in both Murmansk Governorate and the Karelian ASSR, for convenience purposes the colonization department's maps showed the Kandalaksha Forest Division as being entirely on the territory of the Karelian ASSR, which in practice meant that the map showed several inhabited localities of Ekostrovsky Selsoviet of Kolsko-Loparskaya Volost of Murmansk Governorate as being located on the territory of the Karelian ASSR. The governorate's documents, however, continued to list these inhabited localities as being a part of Ekostrovsky Selsoviet.

Later, when the NKVD was creating maps for its own use, it used the colonization department's map as a basis, and the resulting map was used by the NKVD for official purposes. The Murmansk Governorate Executive Committee pointed out this discrepancy on several occasions, but the problem was not resolved by the time the governorate was transformed into an okrug.
