= Ura-Guba =

Ura-Guba Ура-Губа
- Selo
- Interactive map of Ura-Guba
- Location of Ura-Guba Ura-Guba (Murmansk Oblast)
- Coordinates: 69°17′16″N 32°47′59″E
- Country: Russia
- Federal subject: Murmansk Oblast
- Administrative district: Kolsky District
- Territorial okrugSelsoviet: Uragubsky Territorial Okrug
- Founded: 1860s

Population (2010 Census)
  - Total: 517
  - Estimate (2025): 358 (−30.8%)

Municipal status
  - Municipal district: Kolsky Municipal District
  - Rural settlement: Ura-Guba Rural Settlement
- Time zone: UTC+3 (MSK)
- Postal code: 184371
- Dialing code: +7 81553
- OKTMO ID: 47605407101

Ura-Guba (Russian: Ура́-Губа́), also known as Ura (Ура), is a rural locality (a selo) in Kolsky District of Murmansk Oblast, Russia, located beyond the Arctic Circle at a height of 1 meter (3 ft 3 in) above sea level. Population: 517 (2010 Census).

== History ==
It was founded in the 1860s—the decade when the Murman Coast was actively being settled.

By the April 20, 1921 Decision of the Plenary Session of Murmansky Uyezd Executive Committee, Ura-Guba was transferred from Novozerskaya to Alexandrovskaya Volost and became the administrative center of Ursky (Ura-Gubsky) Selsoviet.

On September 11, 1938, Ura-Guba was made the administrative center of Polyarny District by the Decree of the Presidium of the Supreme Soviet of the Russian SFSR. When Polyarny District was abolished on July 9, 1960, Ura-Guba became a part of Kolsky District.
