= Pechengsky =

Pechengsky (masculine), Pechengskaya (feminine), or Pechengskoye (neuter) may refer to:

- Pechengsky District (est. 1945), a district of Murmansk Oblast, Russia
- Pechengskoye Rural Community (1861–1866), a rural community of Kemsky Uyezd of Arkhangelsk Governorate, Russian Empire
- Pechengskaya Volost (1866–1868, 1871–1921), a volost of Kemsky Uyezd of Arkhangelsk Governorate, Russian Empire
