= Gbach =

Gbach Гбач
- Village
- Location within Arkhangelsk Oblast Location within Russia
- Coordinates: 64°19′N 43°03′E
- Country: Russia
- Region: Arkhangelsk Oblast
- District: Kholmogorsky District

Population
  - Total: 648
- Time zone: UTC+3:00

Gbach (Russian: Гбач) is a rural locality (a village) in Belogorskoye Rural Settlement of Kholmogorsky District, Arkhangelsk Oblast, Russia. The population was 648 as of 2010.

== Geography ==
Gbach is located on the Pinega River, 92 km east of Kholmogory (the district's administrative centre) by road. Kuzomen is the nearest rural locality.
