= Teribersky =

Teribersky (masculine), Teriberskaya (feminine), or Teriberskoye (neuter) may refer to:

- Teriberskaya Volost (1912–1927), an administrative division of Alexandrovsky Uyezd of Arkhangelsk Governorate, Russian Empire, and later of Murmansk Governorate of the Russian SFSR
- Teribersky District (1927–1963), an administrative division of Murmansk Okrug of Leningrad Oblast of the Russian SFSR, and later of Murmansk Oblast
