= Pechengskaya Volost =

Former administrative region of the Russian Empire

Pechengskaya Volost (Russian: Пéченгская вóлость) was an administrative division (a volost) of Kemsky and later Kolsky Uyezd of Arkhangelsk Governorate of the Russian Empire, which existed in 1866–1868, and then in 1871–1921.

It was established in 1866 when Pechengskoye Rural Community of Kemsky Uyezd was transformed into a volost. In 1868, together with Ekostrovskaya and Voronyinskaya Volosts it was merged into a newly created Kolsko-Loparskaya Volost.

In 1871, however, the volost was restored under the name of Murmansko-Kolonistskaya (Му́рманско-Колони́стская). When Kolsky Uyezd was restored on February 19 [O.S. February 8], 1883, Murmansko-Kolonistskaya Volost was one of the six volosts transferred to it.

By 1920 (the exact date is unknown), the volost was renamed Pechengskaya, as the volost government was de facto seated in Pechenga.

In the beginning of 1921, as a result of the Treaty of Tartu signed between Russia and Finland on October 14, 1920, the western portion of Pechengskaya Volost (including the Rybachy and Sredny Peninsulas) was ceded to Finland. On April 7, 1921, an assembly of representatives of various Soviet organizations transformed the remaining part of Pechengskaya Volost into new Novozerskaya Volost.
