= Murman Coast =

Area in Murmansk Oblast, Russia

Coordinates: 68°56′13″N 36°49′02″E

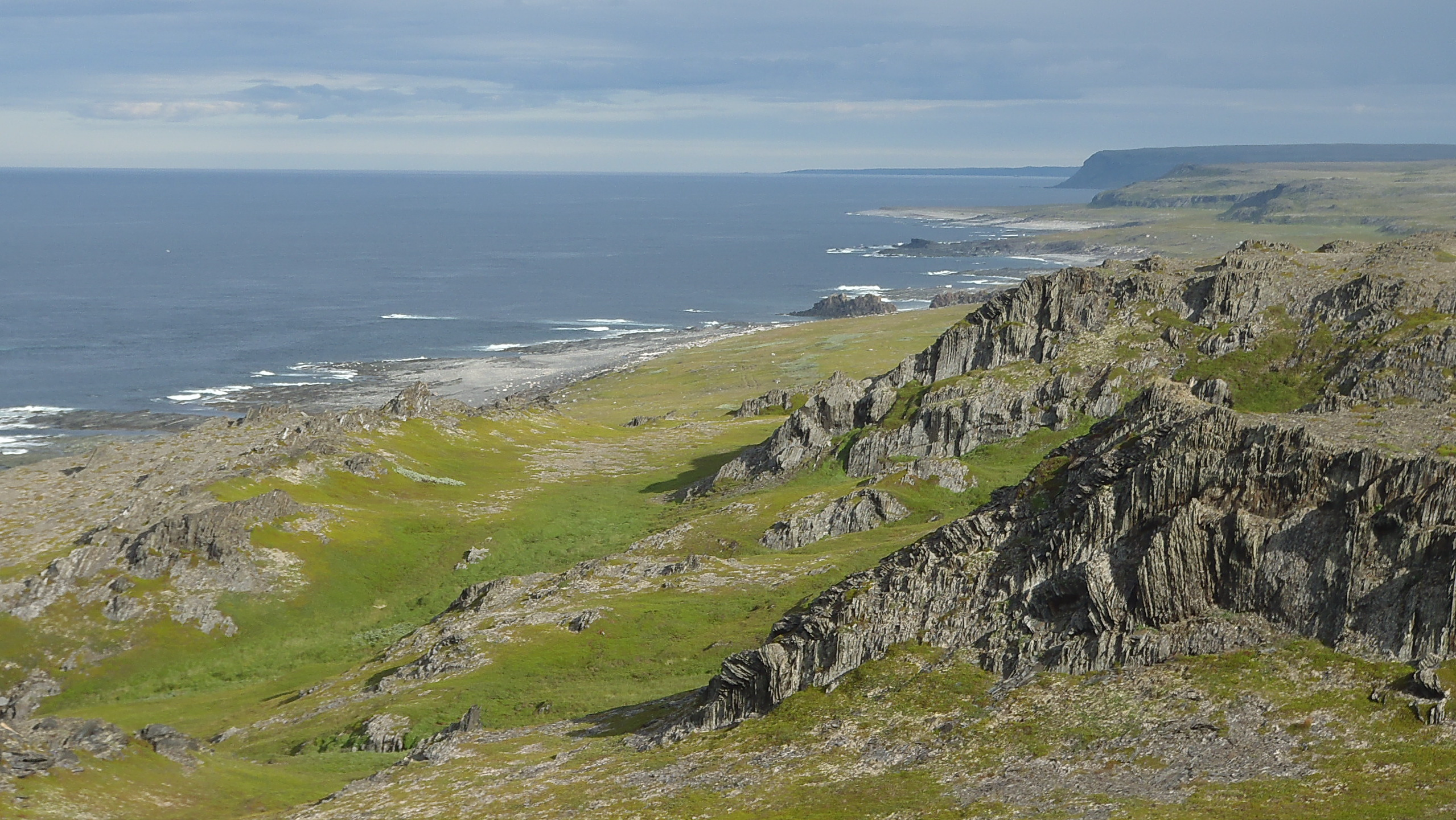
The Murman Coast on the Rybachy Peninsula

The Murman Coast (Russian: Мурманский берег; Norwegian: Murmankysten) is a coastal area in Murmansk Oblast in northwest Russia. It is located on the southern side of the Barents Sea, between the Norway–Russia border and Cape Svyatoy Nos. The major rivers flowing to the sea at the coast are the Tuloma and the Voronya.

== History ==
The coast was inhabited by indigenous Mesolithic hunter-gatherers (8th–7th millennium BC), later by Neolithic groups, before becoming home to the coastal Sámi (1st millennium AD). By the 11th century, it had been populated by Russians, who were engaged in maritime hunting, fur trading, and fishing across the region. The name Murman comes from a Sámi (Lopar) word meaning “edge of the earth”. This naming pattern is mirrored in the Sami toponymy of northern Norway (Finnmark), in names using geographical terms, such as "ravda" ("rávˈdâ"), meaning “edge” or “border”, and "njárga", meaning “point”. In Old Norse, this region was referred to as Bjarmaland, a name that some scholars associate with the Kola Peninsula, though its exact location remains debated.

From the 13th century, the Novgorod Republic spread its influence into parts of the Kola Peninsula, leading to a clash in interests with Norway over the right to tax the Sámi; Finnmark and the Murman Coast formed part of a largely undefined frontier region. During this period, the Novgorodians launched regular military raids into northern and western Norway. The two sides signed border treaties in 1251 and 1326; however, hostilities between the Russians and Norwegians along the border continued until the mid-15th century at least, with Moscow inheriting Novgorod's claim to the region.

== Geography ==
The Murman Coast is administratively shared between Pechengsky, Kolsky and Lovozersky Districts of Murmansk Oblast, and Zaozyorsk, Vidyayevo, Aleksandrovsk, Murmansk, Severomorsk, Ostrovnoy.

The cities of Zaozyorsk, Gadzhiyevo, Polyarny, Snezhnogorsk, Murmansk, Kola, Severomorsk, Ostrovnoy are all located on the Murman Coast.

The Murman Coast, excluding Murmansk, is a Russian border security zone, intended to protect the borders of the Russian Federation from unwanted activity. In order to visit the zone, a permit issued by the local FSB department is required.

== See also ==
- Bjarmaland
- Kola Norwegians
- Pomor trade
- Russenorsk
- Ushkuyniks
- Viking expansion
