= Kuzomen =

Kuzomen (Russian: Кузомень) is the name of several rural localities in Russia:

- Kuzomen, Arkhangelsk Oblast, a village in Leunovsky Selsoviet of Kholmogorsky District of Arkhangelsk Oblast
- Kuzomen, Murmansk Oblast, a selo in Tersky District of Murmansk Oblast
