= Polyarny, Murmansk Oblast =

Town in Murmansk Oblast, Russia

Polyarny Полярный
- Town
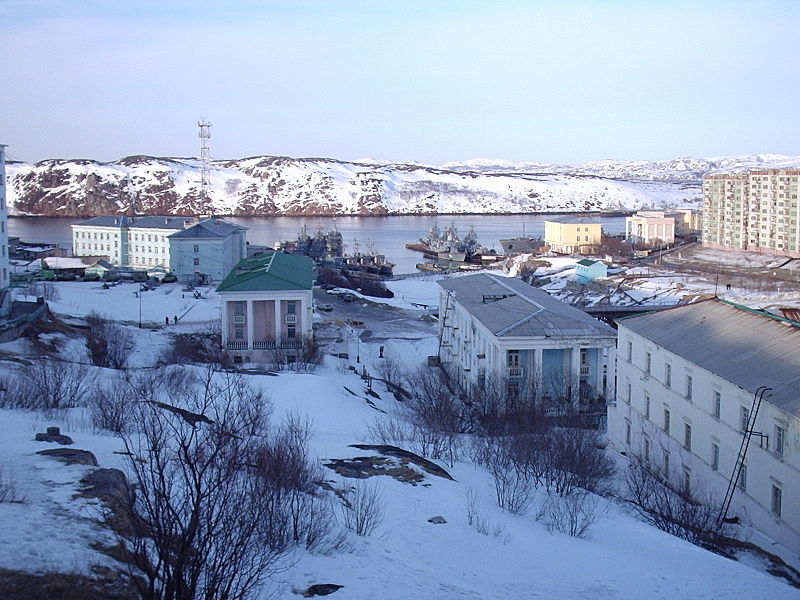
- View of Polyarny

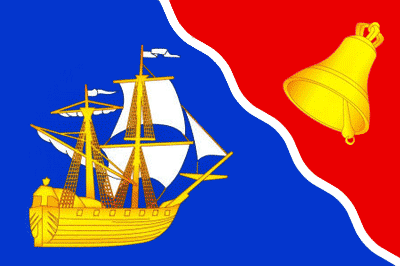
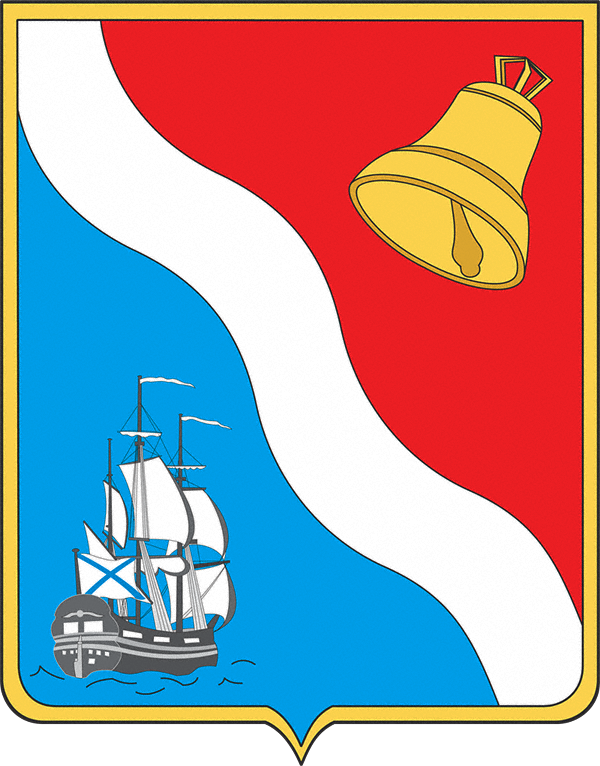
- Flag Coat of arms
- Interactive map of Polyarny
- Location of Polyarny Polyarny (Murmansk Oblast)
- Coordinates: 69°12′N 33°28′E
- Country: Russia
- Federal subject: Murmansk Oblast
- Founded: 1896

Government
  - Mayor: Vladimir Cherepov
- Elevation: 20 m (66 ft)

Population (2010 Census)
  - Total: 17,293
  - Estimate (2023): 12,154 (−29.7%)

Administrative status
  - Subordinated to: closed administrative-territorial formation of Alexandrovsk
  - Capital of: closed administrative-territorial formation of Alexandrovsk

Municipal status
  - Urban okrug: Alexandrovsk Urban Okrug
  - Capital of: Alexandrovsk Urban Okrug
- Postal codes: 184650, 184651, 184653
- Dialing code: +7 81551

Polyarny (Russian: Поля́рный) is a town and the administrative center of the closed administrative-territorial formation of Alexandrovsk in Murmansk Oblast, Russia, situated on the outermost western side of the Kola Bay. Population: 17,293 (2010 census); 18,552 (2002 census); 27,635 (1989 Soviet census).

Historical population
| Year | Pop. | ±% |
|---|---|---|
| 1926 | 408 | — |
| 1939 | 7,068 | +1632.4% |
| 1959 | 11,354 | +60.6% |
| 1970 | 15,321 | +34.9% |
| 1979 | 20,015 | +30.6% |
| 1989 | 27,635 | +38.1% |
| 2002 | 18,552 | −32.9% |
| 2010 | 17,293 | −6.8% |
| 2021 | 12,293 | −28.9% |
Source: Censuses

It was previously known as Alexandrovsk (until 15 March 1926), Alexandrovskoye (until 11 March 1931), Polyarnoye (until 19 September 1939).

== History ==
It was founded in 1896 and named Alexandrovsk (Алекса́ндровск) in honor of Tsar Alexander III. Other sources, however, state that the original name was Alexandrovsk-na-Murmane (Алекса́ндровск-на-Му́рмане), it was called so after Alexandra Fyodorovna, wife of Emperor Nicholas II, and did not become known as "Alexandrovsk" until later.

Town status was granted to it on 20 June [O.S. 7 June] 1899. At the same time, Alexandrovsk became an uyezd town, for which reason Kolsky Uyezd was renamed Alexandrovsky.

On 3 May 1920 the Alexandrovskaya Volost Executive Committee divided the territory of the volost into six selsoviets, including Alexandrovsky Selsoviet with the administrative center in Alexandrovsk. However, the Murmansky Uyezd Executive Committee's did not approve the creation of all six selsoviets, with Alexandrovsky Selsoviet being one which did not get an approval.

On 16 October 1925, when the Murmansk Governorate Commission meeting initiated work on compiling lists of the urban and rural localities — Murmansk, Alexandrovsk, and Kola were categorized as urban; however, a recommendation was sent to the All-Russian Central Executive Committee (VTsIK) to demote the latter two to rural localities due to economic conditions, sparse population, low trade volume, lack of industrial enterprises, and "general regression". On 9 January 1926 the assembly of the town residents created Alexandrovsky Selsoviet and on 15 March 1926, when the VTsIK approved the recommendation to demote the towns, Alexandrovsk and Kola were re-categorized as rural localities. At the same time the name was unofficially changed to Alexandrovskoye (Александровское).

On 12 January 1931 the Third Congress of the Soviets of Alexandrovsky District issued a resolution, renaming the district "Polyarny"; at the same time the village of Alexandrovskoye was renamed Polyarnoye (Поля́рное). On 5 March 1931 the new name of the district was approved by the administrative commission of the Leningrad Oblast Executive Committee, and on 11 March 1931 by its Presidium. While the Presidium of the VTsIK never officially gave a final approval for this renaming, de facto the name has changed.

In 1934, the Murmansk Okrug Executive Committee unsuccessfully petitioned to grant town status to Polyarnoye and to rename it Krasnoflotsk. Town status, however, was not granted to Polyarnoye until 19 September 1939, when it was at the same time renamed Polyarny.

By the 14 June 1956 Decree of the Presidium of the Supreme Soviet of the Russian SFSR, Polyarny was demoted in status to that of a town under district jurisdiction and subordinated to Polyarny District. By the Decree of the Presidium of the Supreme Soviet of the RSFSR of 9 July 1960, Polyarny District was abolished and the town of Polyarny was administratively subordinated to Severomorsk. Finally, by the 17 June 1983 Presidium of the Supreme Soviet of the RSFSR Decree, the town was elevated in status to that of a town under oblast jurisdiction, and by the 10 August 1983 Decision of the Murmansk Oblast Executive Committee, several inhabited localities previously subordinated to Severomorsk were transferred to it.

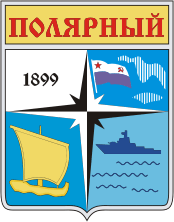
Old coat of arms of Polyarny

== Administrative and municipal status ==
Within the framework of administrative divisions, Polyarny serves as the administrative center of the closed administrative-territorial formation of Alexandrovsk—an administrative unit with the status equal to that of the districts—to which it is directly subordinated. Within the framework of municipal divisions, the town of Polyarny is a part of Alexandrovsk Urban Okrug.

== Military ==
Since the 1930s Polyarny has had naval significance. Russian Shipyard Number 10 (Shkval) is located in Polyarny, and in the West is more often referred to by the name of the town than by its official name. As the first nuclear-powered submarines were delivered to the Northern Fleet at the end of the 1950s, the yard was modified for docking and repair of these vessels. As Soviet (and now Russian) naval nuclear vessels are decommissioned, they are laid up at Polyarny to await defuelling and disposal.

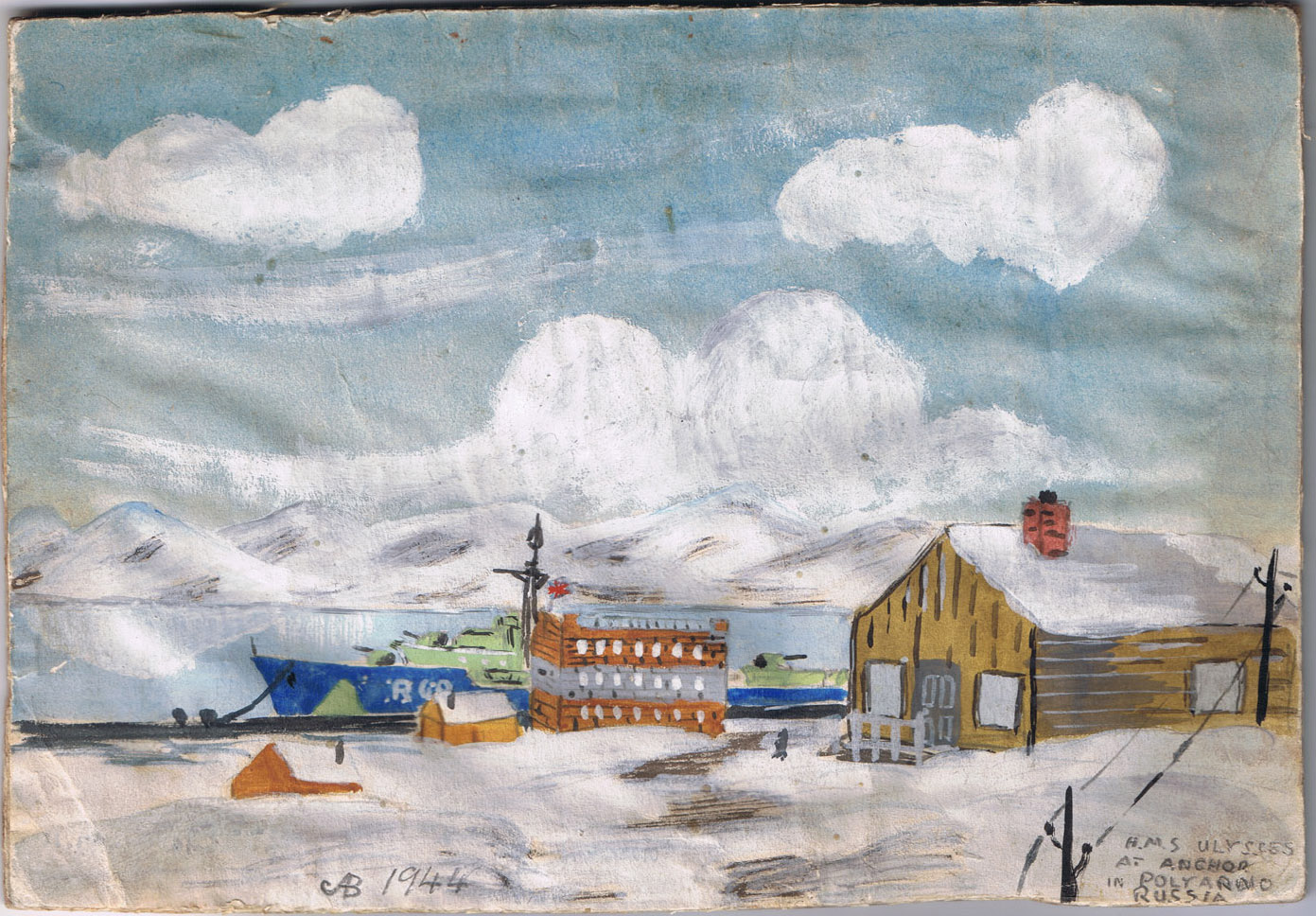
Watercolor of HMS Ulysses at "Polyarno" (Polyarny), May 1944, by Arnold Barlow (crewmember). Part of the 1944 "Arctic Convoys" supplying Russia in World War II

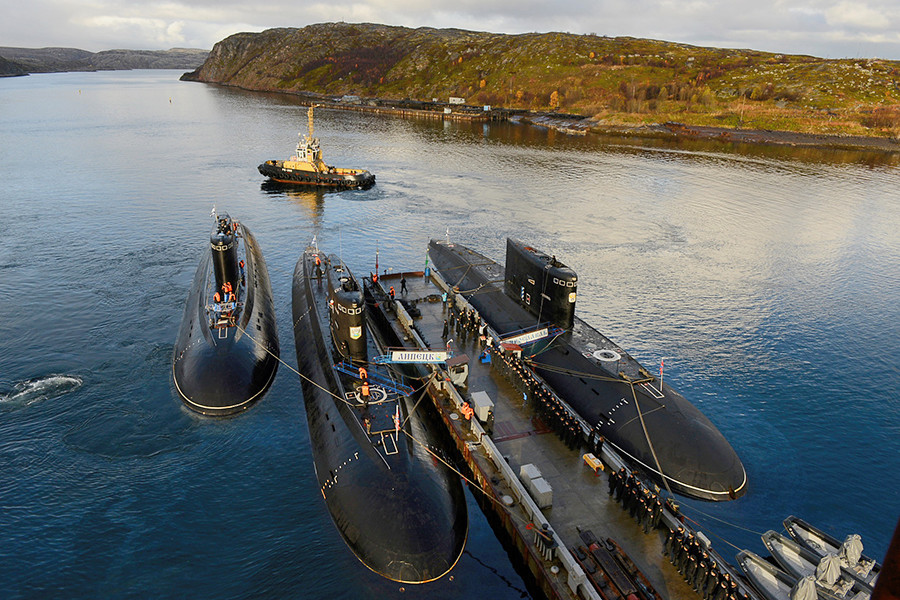
Kilo-class submarines

== Honors ==
In a presidential decree dated 5 May 2008 the town of Polyarny was awarded the title of City of Military Glory.

== In popular culture ==
In the Tom Clancy novel The Hunt for Red October, the experimental Typhoon-class nuclear submarine Red October departs on her voyage from Polyarny.

In the 2018 action thriller Hunter Killer, directed by Donovan Marsh, the main plot revolves around an attempted coup d'état against the Russian President while he is visiting a major Russian base of naval operations in Polyarny.
