= Kolsky Uyezd =

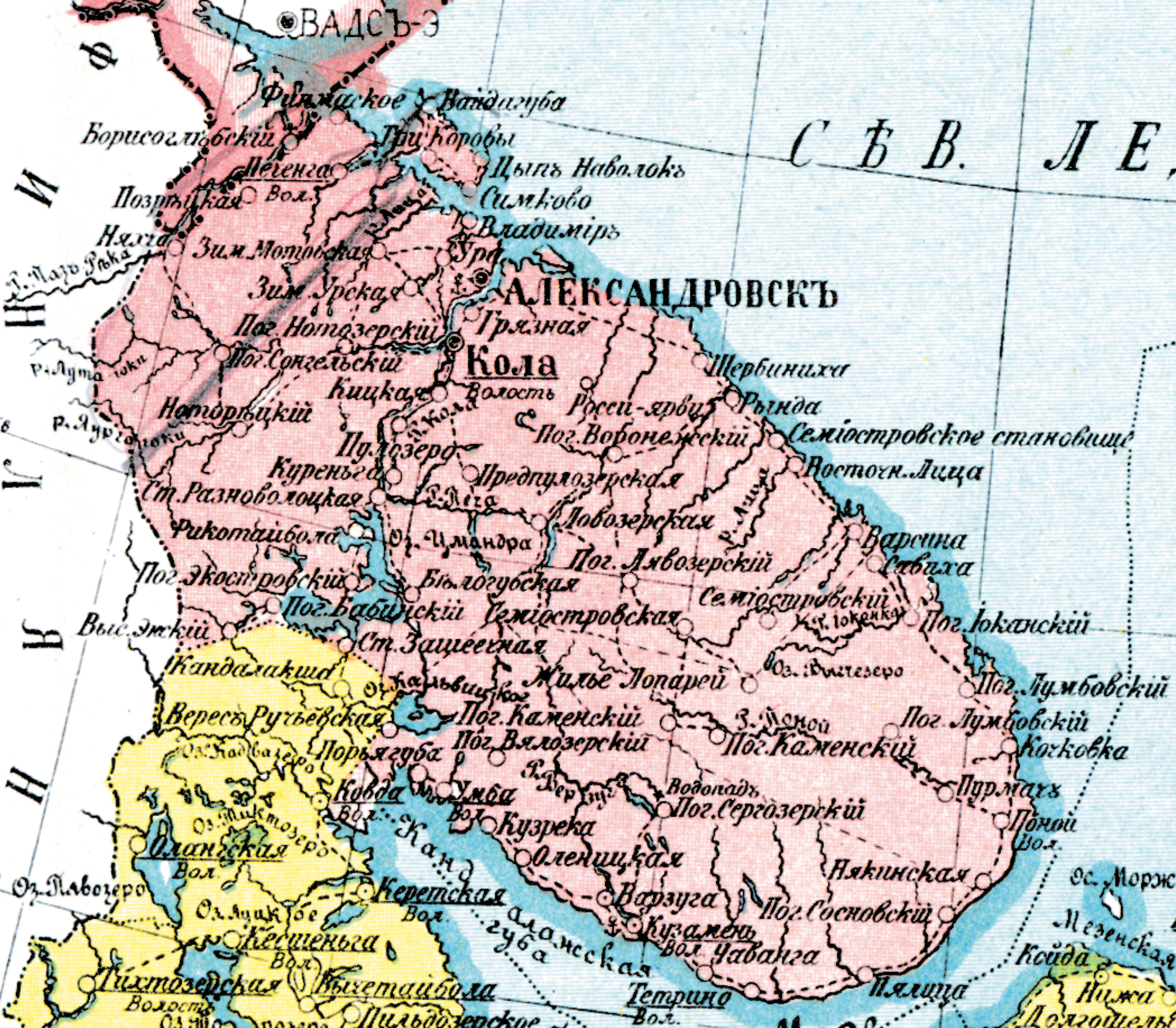
1913 map of Kolsky Uyezd

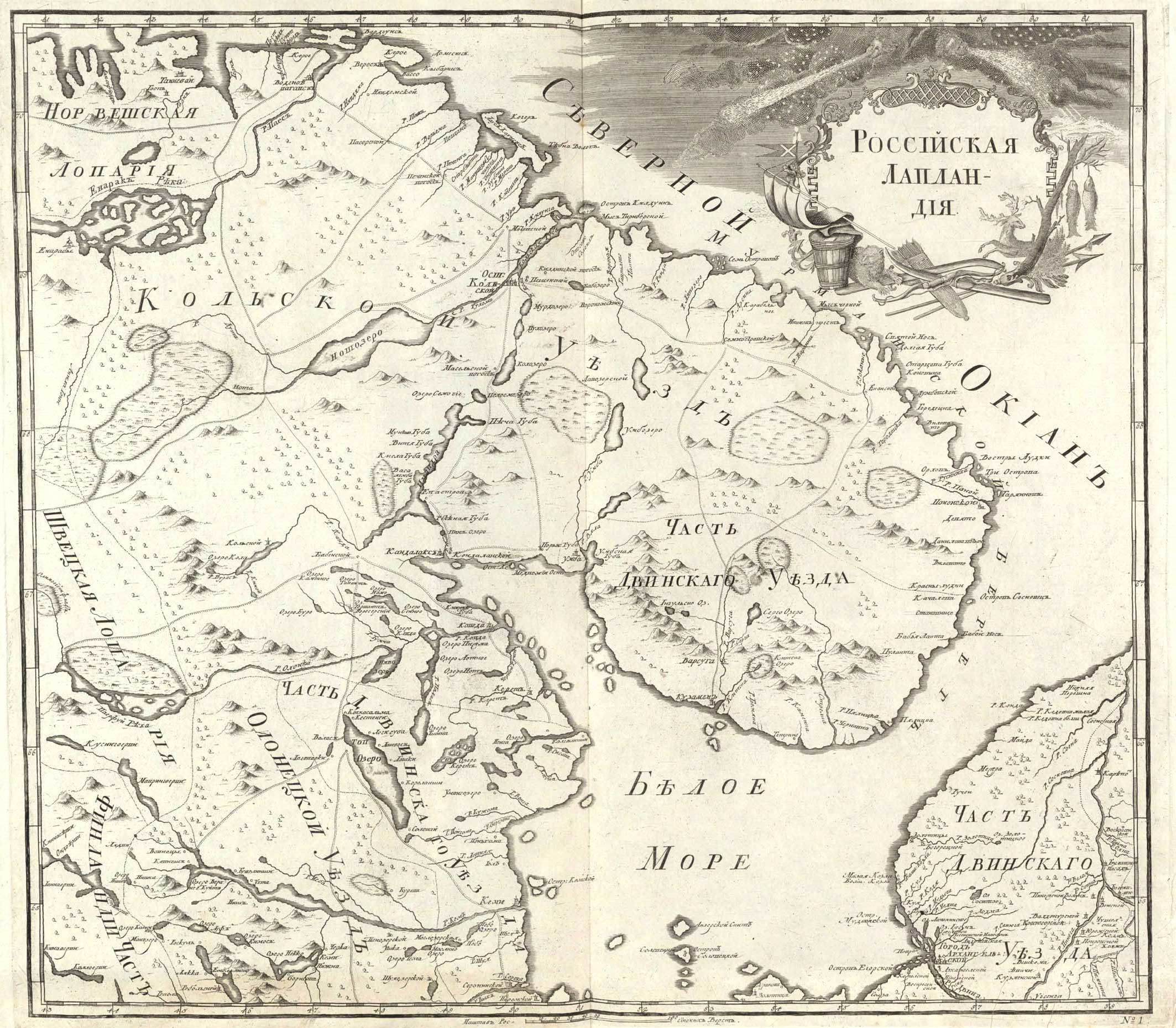
1745 map of Kolsky Uyezd

Kolsky Uyezd (Russian: Ко́льский уе́зд) was an administrative division (an uyezd) of the Tsardom of Russia and later of the Russian Empire.

== History ==
=== 16th–17th centuries ===
Russian expansion to the Kola Peninsula can be traced to the early 16th century when the Russian monk Trifon founded an Orthodox monastery at Pechenga. Later in 1556, Ivan the Terrible, by his own will, gave the monastery a large part of land on the peninsula. This land covered territories which Norway—then a part of the kingdom of Denmark–Norway—traditionally considered as their own. Consequently, Frederick II, the King of Denmark–Norway, sent two expeditions in the 1580s and in 1586 to give up the peninsula. His claims were, however, contested by Sweden, then the major power in the Baltic region.

At first, Sweden extracted the Kola Peninsula from both Russia and Denmark–Norway in a series of wars and resulting treaties. However, in the later Treaty of Täysinä in 1595, Sweden acknowledged Russian rights in Kola. Claims from Denmark–Norway remained, and therefore in 1582, a Russian voivode was appointed to Kola to provide for better defenses of the peninsula. The voivode governed the territory which became known as Kolsky Uyezd. Upon its creation, the uyezd covered most of the territory of the Kola Peninsula, with the exception of Varzuzhskaya and Umbskaya Volosts (which were a part of Dvinsky Uyezd), and also the northern part of Karelia all the way to Lendery.

In 1608–1611, a population census was conducted in the uyezd. The census categorized the Sami people (called "Lapps" by the census) living in the uyezd into three groups—Terskaya Lapps, who lived west of the line between Kildin Island and Turiy Headland of the Turiy Peninsula; Konchanskaya Lapps, who lived east of that line; and Leshya (wild, unbaptized) Lapps, who lived south of Kandalaksha all the way south to approximately the 65th parallel. The territories on which each group lived were also named by the same terms (Terskaya, Konchanskaya, and Leshya).

The territory of the Terskaya Lapps included the Sami pogosts of Voroninsky, Norensky (Semiostrovsky), Lovozersky, Ponoysky, and Kandala. The territory of Konchanskaya Lapps comprised the pogosts of Babinsky, Yekostrovsky, Maselgsky, Songelsky, Notozersky, Munomoshsky (Kildinsky), Motovsky, Pechengsky, Pazretsky, and Nyavdemsky. In 1623–1624, the territory of the Konchanskaya Lapps was occasionally called the "Upper Lands" (Верхняя земля).

Apart from the Sami pogosts, the uyezd also included Kandalakshskaya, Knyazhegubskaya, Kovdskaya, Keretskaya, and Poryegubskaya Volosts, as well as northern Karelia. Kolsky ostrog served as the administrative center.

=== 18th century ===
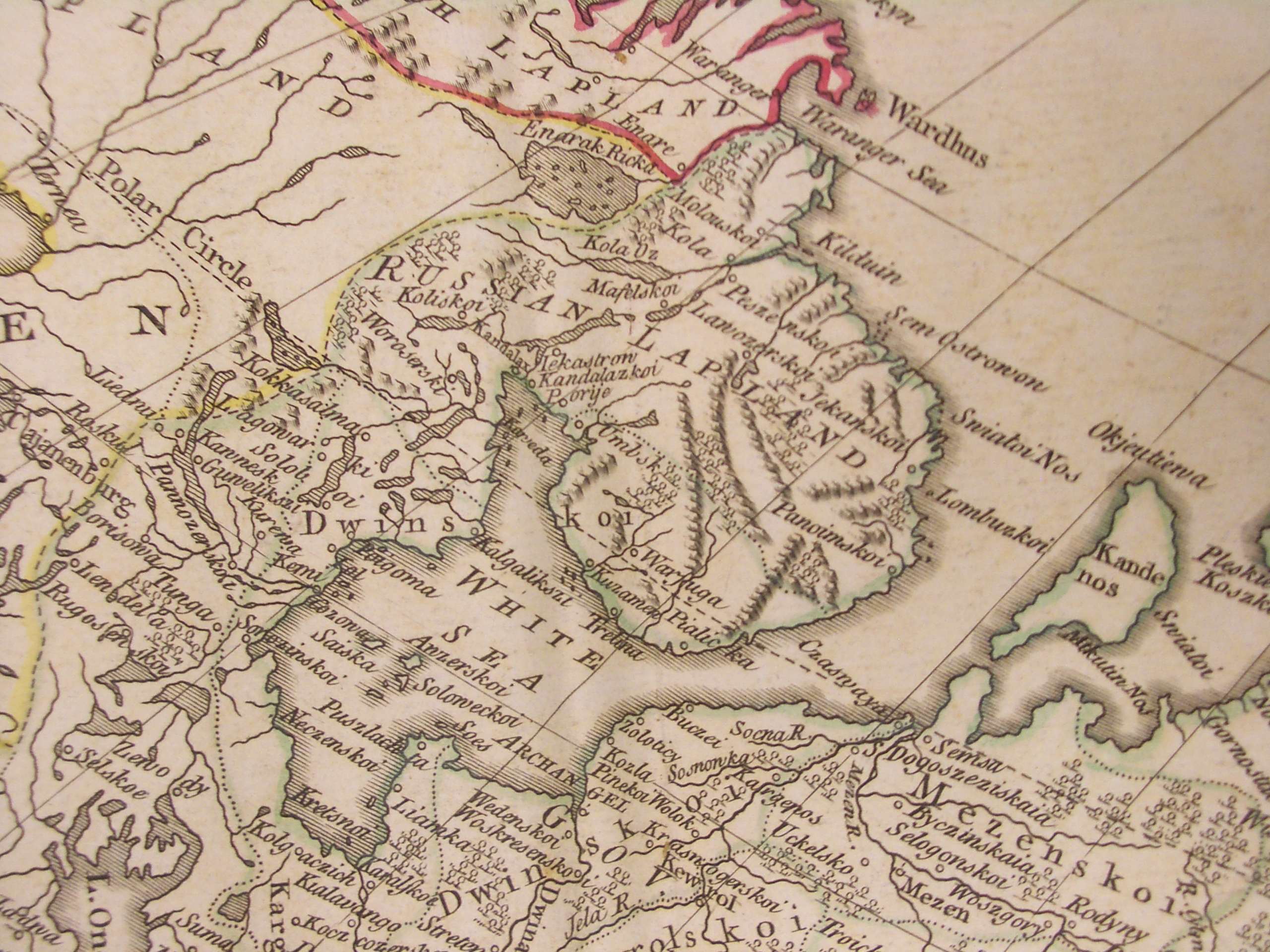
Kolsky Uyezd (labeled "Russian Lapland") in the Atlas of Thomas Kitchin, 1773

From the time of its foundation, the uyezd was governed directly from Moscow. This changed on December 29 [O.S. December 18], 1708, when Tsar Peter the Great divided the country into eight governorates, and Kolsky and Dvinsky Uyezds became a part of Archangelgorod Governorate. When Archangelgorod Governorate was abolished by Catherine II on February 5 [O.S. January 25] 1780, Kolsky Uyezd became a part of Arkhangelsk Oblast of Vologda Viceroyalty. When Arkhangelsk Oblast was re-organized into Arkhangelsk Viceroyalty by Catherine II's decree on April 6 [O.S. March 26], 1784, Kolsky Uyezd became a part of it as well. The borders of the uyezd were also changed—Varzuzhskaya and Umbskaya Volosts were transferred under its jurisdiction, while most territories in northern Karelia were transferred into Kemsky Uyezd.

Administrative divisions of Kolsky Uyezd in 1785
- Volosts: 1. Kandalakshskaya; 2. Keretskaya; 3. Knyazhegubskaya; 4. Kovdskaya; 5. Poryegubskaya; 6. Umbskaya; 7. Varzuzhskaya
- Selos: 1. Ponoy
- Pogosts: 1. Babensky; 2. Ekostrovsky; 3. Kildinsky; 4. Lovozersky; 5. Maselgsky; 6. Motovsky; 7. Notozersky; 8. Nyavdemsky; 9. Pazretsky; 10. Pechengsky; 11. Pyaozersky; 12. Semiostrovsky; 13. Songelsky; 14. Voronezhsky
- Other: 1. Pyalitskaya slobodka 2. Tetrinskaya slobodka 3. Terskaya Lapps; 4. Chernoretskoye usolye

Upon Paul I's accession to the throne in 1796, all viceroyalties in Russia were abolished, and the country was divided into governorates instead. Arkhangelsk Viceroyalty was transformed into Arkhangelsk Governorate, of which Kolsky Uyezd became a part.

=== 19th century ===
The borders of the uyezd were changed again in 1826. According to the treaty between Russia and the Sweden–Norway union, the territory to the west of the Voryema River was ceded to Norway. Russia retained only a small plot of land on the left bank of the Paz River with a 16th-century church of Boris and Gleb, and a pogost, today's Borisoglebsky.

1828 saw more changes—Knyazhegubskaya Volost was merged into Kandalakshskaya Volost; Chernoretskoye usolye was merged into Kovdskaya Volost, Tetrinskaya slobodka and Pyalitskaya slobodka, along with Ponoy, were merged into Varzuzhskaya Volost, and Poryegubskaya Volost was merged into Umbskaya Volost.

On May 31 [O.S. May 20], 1841, all volosts in the uyezds of Arkhangelsk Governorate were enlarged. In Kolsky Uyezd, only two volosts remained—Kovdskaya, which included old Keretskaya and Kandalakshskaya Volosts and all of the pogosts; and Kuzomenskaya, which was formed from Varzuzhskaya and Umbskaya Volosts and the territory of the Terskaya Lapps).

After having been reduced nearly to ashes as a result of a bombardment by a British ship in 1854, the town of Kola went into decline. As a result, on December 13 [O.S. December 2], 1858, Tsar Alexander II approved a State Council opinion "On Changing the Governance in the Town of Kola and in Kolsky Uyezd" that Kolsky Uyezd be abolished and its territory merged into Kemsky Uyezd.

The uyezd was restored on February 19 [O.S. February 8], 1883 when Tsar Alexander III approved a new opinion of the State Council, although the territory of the restored uyezd was smaller than its pre-1858 territory. In 1899, it was renamed Alexandrovsky Uyezd.

== Demographics ==
At the time of the Russian Empire Census of 1897, Kolsky Uyezd had 9,291 inhabitants. Of those, 63.1% spoke Russian, 18.7% Sami, 11.7% Finnish, 2.8% Karelian, 2.0% Norwegian or Danish, 1.3% Komi-Zyrian, and 0.3% Nenets as their first language.
