= Tetrino =

Tetrino Тетрино
- Selo
- Interactive map of Tetrino
- Location of Tetrino Tetrino (Murmansk Oblast)
- Coordinates: 66°03′51″N 38°14′37″E
- Country: Russia
- Federal subject: Murmansk Oblast
- Administrative district: Tersky District
- Founded: 1660

Population (2010 Census)
  - Total: 18
  - Estimate (2021): 21 (+16.7%)

Municipal status
  - Municipal district: Tersky Municipal District
  - Rural settlement: Varzuga Rural Settlement
- Time zone: UTC+3 (MSK)
- Postal code: 184715
- Dialing code: +7 81559
- OKTMO ID: 47620401121

Tetrino (Russian: Тетрино) is a rural locality (a selo) in Tersky District of Murmansk Oblast, Russia, located on the Kola Peninsula at a height of 6 meters (20 ft) above sea level. Population: 18 (2010 Census).

== History ==
Tetrino was established in 1660, when some of the residents of Varzuga moved out to the coast. In 1785, its population consisted of five households. In 1854–1855, Tetrino was attacked by the English. A school was opened in 1890. In 1914, the population was 515 inhabitants living in 85 households.
