= Kholmogorsky Uyezd =

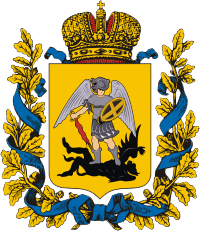
Coat of Arms of Arkhangelsk Governorate, Russian Empire

Kholmogorsky Uyezd (Холмогорский уезд) was one of the subdivisions of the Arkhangelsk Governorate of the Russian Empire. It was situated in the central part of the governorate. Its administrative centre was Kholmogory.

== Demographics ==
At the time of the Russian Empire Census of 1897, Kholmogorsky Uyezd had a population of 35,991. Of these, 99.8% spoke Russian and 0.1% Polish as their native language.
