= Barkino =

Barkino Баркино
- Village
- Location within Vladimir Oblast Location within Russia
- Coordinates: 55°51′N 41°15′E
- Country: Russia
- Region: Vladimir Oblast
- District: Sudogodsky District
- Time zone: UTC+3:00

Barkino (Russian: Баркино) is a rural locality (a village) in Moshokskoye Rural Settlement, Sudogodsky District, Vladimir Oblast, Russia. The population was 28 as of 2010.

== Geography ==
Barkino is located 8 km north from Moshok, 41 km southeast of Sudogda (the district's administrative centre) by road. Krasny Kust is the nearest rural locality.
