= Arkhangelsk Oblast, Russian Empire =

Russian Empire administrative division (1780–1784)

Arkhangelsk Oblast (Russian: Арха́нгельская о́бласть, Arkhangelskaya oblast) was an administrative division (an oblast) of Vologda Viceroyalty of the Russian Empire, which existed in 1780–1784. Its seat was located in the city of Arkhangelsk.

Arkhangelsk Oblast was one of the three original oblasts of Vologda Viceroyalty, when the latter was established by the Catherine II's decree (ukase) on February 5 [O.S. January 25], 1780.

It was divided into six uezds,

- Kholmogorsky Uyezd with the center in Kholmogory;
- Kolsky Uyezd with the center in Kola;
- Mezensky Uyezd with the center in Mezen;
- Onezhsky Uyezd with the center in Onega;
- Pinezhsky Uyezd with the center in Pinega;
- Shenkursky Uyezd with the center in Shenkursk.

Arkhangelsk was the center of the oblast but did not belong to any uezd.

In 1780, Arkhangelsk, Velsk, Kola, Krasnoborsk, Mezen, Onega, Pinega, Solvychegodsk, Shenkursk, and Yarensk were given the town status, and coat of arms were designed for these towns.

The oblast was abolished by Catherine II's decree on April 6 [O.S. March 26], 1784, when it was re-organized into Arkhangelsk Viceroyalty with the administrative center in Archangel.
