= Archangelgorod Governorate =

1708–1780 unit of Russia

Coordinates: 59.215°N 39.877°E

Archangelgorod Governorate Архангелогородская губерния
- Governorate of the Russian Empire
- 1708–1780
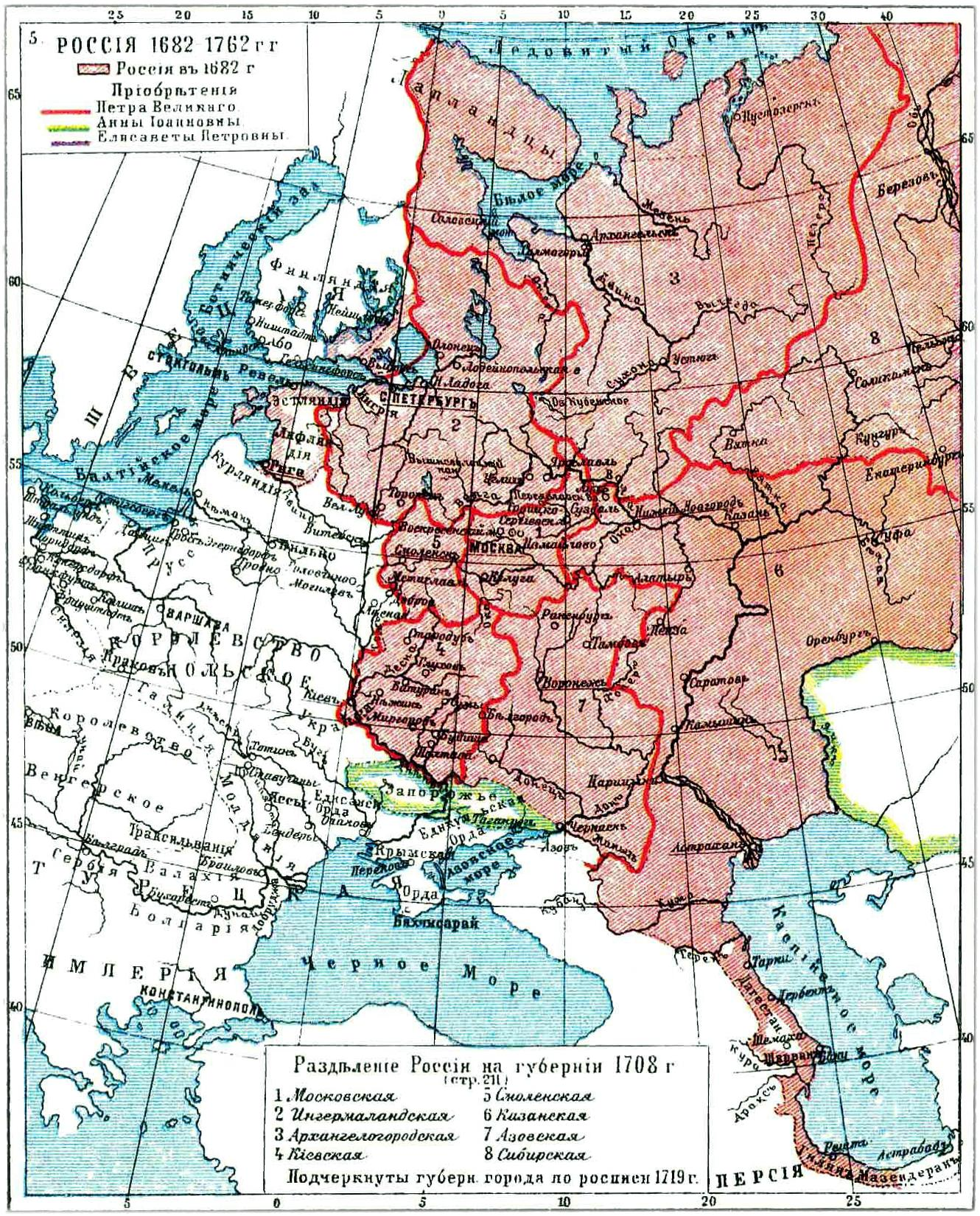
- Russia in 1682–1762. Archangelgorod Governorate is shown as number 3.
- Capital: Archangel
- History
  - Established: December 29 [O.S. December 18] 1708
  - Disestablished: February 5 [O.S. January 25] 1780
- Political subdivisions: four provinces
Succeeded by
Vologda Viceroyalty; Kostroma Viceroyalty

Archangelgorod Governorate (Russian: Архангелогородская губерния, romanized: Arkhangelogorodskaya guberniya) was an administrative-territorial unit (guberniya) of the Tsardom of Russia and the Russian Empire, which existed from 1708 until 1780. Its seat was in Archangel (Arkhangelsk). The governorate was located in the north of the Russian Empire and bordered Siberia Governorate in the east, Kazan Governorate in the southeast, Moscow and Ingermanland Governorates in the southwest, Sweden (later independent Finland) in the west, and Norway in north-west. In the north, the governorate was limited by the White and Barents Seas.

Archangelgorod Governorate, together with seven other governorates, was established on December 29 [O.S. December 18], 1708, by Tsar Peter the Great's edict. As with the rest of the governorates, neither the borders nor internal subdivisions of Archangelgorod Governorate were defined; instead, the territory was defined as a set of cities and the lands adjacent to those cities.

Cities included into Archangelgorod Governorate at the time of its establishment
#	City	#	City	#	City
1.	Arkhangelskoy	8.	Kolskoy Ostrog	15.	Totma
2.	Charonda	9.	Mezen	16.	Unzha
3.	Chukhloma	10.	Parfenyev	17.	Ustya volosts
4.	Galich	11.	Pustozerskoy	18.	Ustyug Veliky
5.	Kevrol	12.	Sol Galitskaya	19.	Vaga
6.	Kineshma	13.	Sol Vychegodskaya	20.	Vologda
7.	Kologrivov	14.	Suday		

In terms of the modern political division of Russia, Archangelgorod Governorate comprised the areas of what is currently Murmansk Oblast, Nenets Autonomous Okrug and the Komi Republic, the greater parts of Arkhangelsk and Vologda Oblasts, as well as parts of the Republic of Karelia, Kostroma, Kirov, and Nizhny Novgorod Oblasts.

On June 9 [O.S. May 29], 1719, the governorate was divided into provinces: Archangelgorod, Vologda, Galich, and Ustyug. Simultaneously, Yarensky Uyezd with the administrative center of Yarensk was moved from Siberia Governorate to Archangelgorod Governorate. The uyezds were transformed into districts, however, in 1727 the districts were transformed back into uyezds.

The governorate existed until February 5 [O.S. January 25] 1780, when it was transformed into Vologda Viceroyalty.

== Governors ==
The administration of the governorate was performed by a governor. The governors of the Arkhangelogorod Governorate were

- 1708-1711 Pyotr Alexeevich Golitsyn
- 1711-1714 Alexey Alexandrovich Kurbatov (vice-governor)
- 1714–1725 Pyotr Yefimovich Lodyzhensky
- 1725–1727 Ivan Petrovich Izmaylov
- 1727–1728 Ivan Mikhaylovich Likharev
- 1728–1729 Villim Fermor
- 1729–1732 Semyon Fyodorovich Meshchersky
- 1732-1732 Ivan Maksimovich Shuvalov
- 1732–1738 Mikhail Yuryevich Shcherbatov (the father of Mikhail Shcherbatov)
- 1738–1740 Andrey Litskin
- 1740-1740 Pyotr Kalinovich Pushkin
- 1740–1743 Alexey Andreyevich Obolensky-Bely
- 1743–1745 Alexey Mikhaylovich Pushkin
- 1745–1762 Stepan Alexeyevich Yuryev
- 1762–1763 Grigory Filatovich Sukhotin
- 1763–1780 Yegor Andreyevich Golovtsyn
