= Vologda Oblast, Russian Empire =

Vologda Oblast (Russian: Волого́дская о́бласть) was an administrative division (an oblast) of Vologda Viceroyalty of the Russian Empire, which existed in 1780–1796.

Vologda Oblast was one of the three original oblasts of Vologda Viceroyalty, when the latter was established by the Catherine II's decree (ukase) on February 5 [O.S. January 25], 1780.
