= Umba, Russia =

Umba Умба
- Urban-type settlement
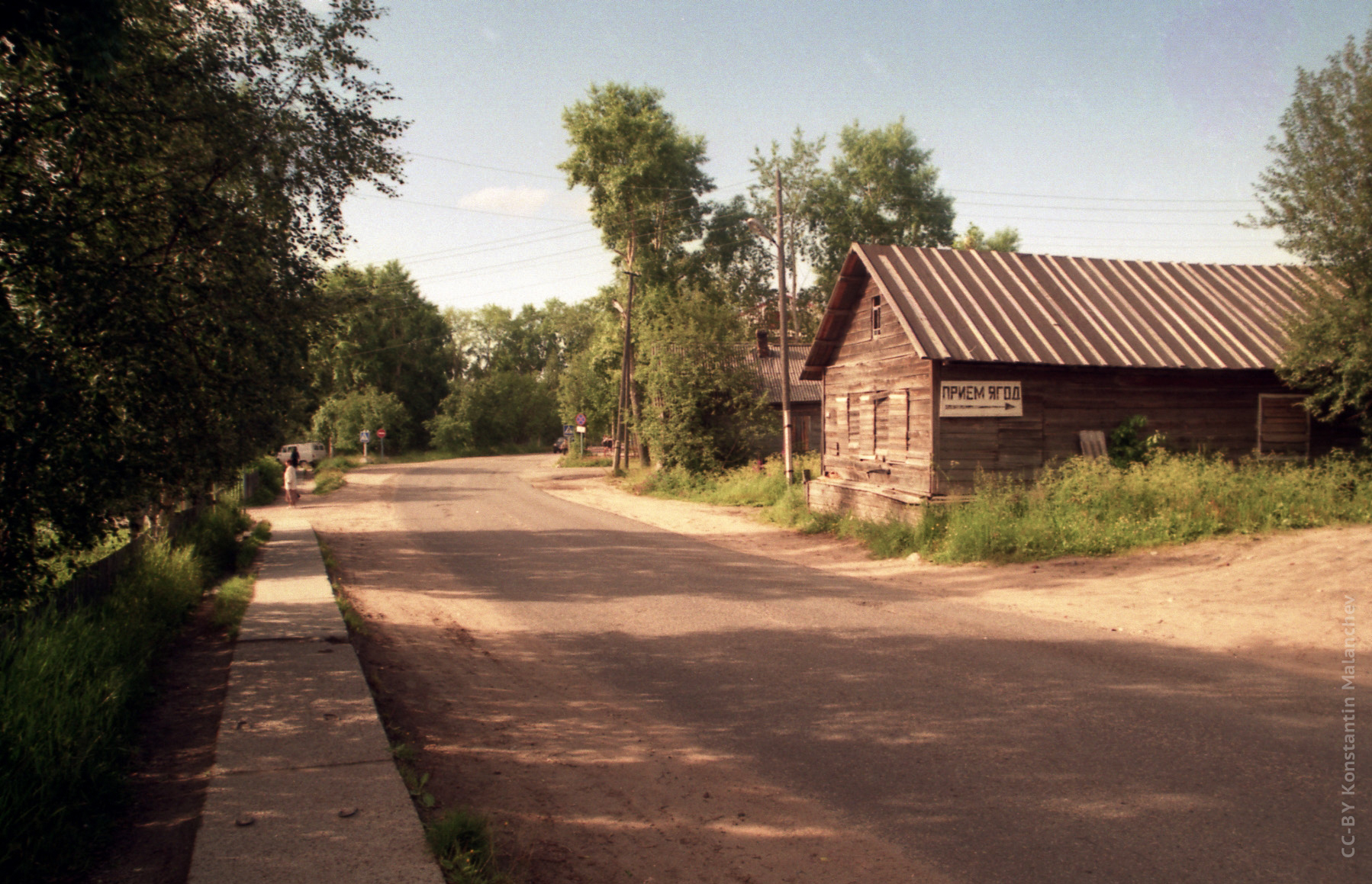

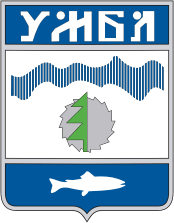
- Coat of arms
- Interactive map of Umba
- Location of Umba Umba (Murmansk Oblast)
- Coordinates: 66.6894444°N 34.3469444°E
- Country: Russia
- Federal subject: Murmansk Oblast
- Administrative district: Tersky District
- Elevation: 5 m (16 ft)

Population (2010 Census)
  - Total: 5,532
  - Estimate (2023): 4,031 (−27.1%)

Municipal status
  - Municipal district: Tersky Municipal District
  - Urban settlement: Umba Urban Settlement
- Time zone: UTC+3 (MSK)
- Postal code: 184701–184703
- Dialing code: +7 81559
- OKTMO ID: 47620151051

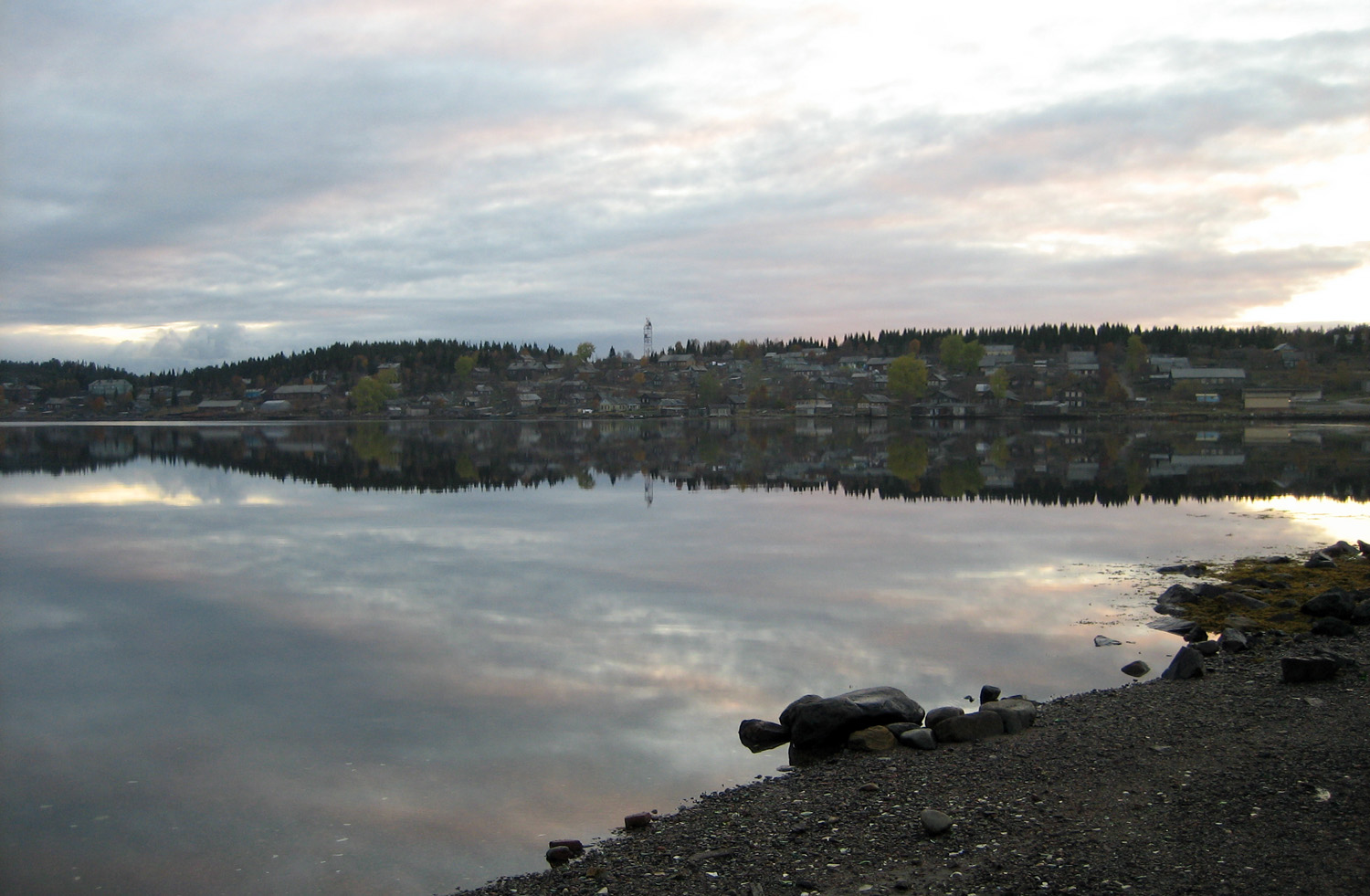
View of Umba

Umba (Russian: Умба) is an urban locality (an urban-type settlement) in Tersky District of Murmansk Oblast, Russia, located on the Kola Peninsula at the point where the Umba River flows into the Kandalaksha Gulf. Population: 5,532 (2010 census); 6,497 (2002 census); 8,309 (1989 Soviet census).

== History ==
First mentioned in 1466, Umba, along with Varzuga, is the first documented permanent Russian settlement on the Kola Peninsula. From the second half of the 15th century it served as the seat of Umbskaya Volost.

== Politics and society ==
Umba has been characterized by several sources as a quiet district managed by traditional Communists.

== Transportation &Foreigner travel ==
There is a bus from to Umba from Kandalaksha, going twice a day. The airport from Umba serves parts of the south edge of the Peninsula inaccessible by auto. Priority in buying tickets is given to locals, and reserving them was not possible at least as of September 2013; this mode of transportation cannot be considered reliable. A helicopter can be hired for around $3000 per hour (based in September 2013 information).

Some of the coastline near Umba is off limits to foreigners. Local police should be consulted for details. Visitors may stay in Umba itself or travel along the road that goes along the sea from Kandalaksha to Varzuga.

== Culture, events, tourist information, travel services ==
(taken from www.kandalaksha.su)

- Tourist Information Center, ul. Dzherzhinskogo 40, (881559) 51744.
- Folklore Festival three times a year
- Pomor Rawing Regatta, yearly
- Pomor Kuzulya (bread figurine) Festival at Kuzreka
- Sports Fishing Contest “Fish Face”
- Library of Pomor History and Culture, ul. Dzerzhinskogo 40, tel. 8 (81559) 51373.
- Museum of History, Culture, and Industry of Tersky Pomors, ul. Dzherzhinskogo 78, tel. 8 (81559) 51532, open Tue. to Sat. 9am to 5pm, closed Sunday and Monday.
- Kanozero Rock Carvings Museum, ul. Dzerzhinskogo 40, tel. 8 81559 50657, 8 911 312 9557, open Mon. to Thur. 8am to 5pm, closed for lunch noon to 1pm, Friday 8am to 12noon, closed Saturday and Sunday.
- “Tonya Tetrina” fishing station. A history and ethnography complex. 27 km east from Umba (towards Varzuga). Tel. 8 911 343 5140.
- Umba Students Science Society.
- Amethyst Shore. Souvenirs, workshops. Ul. Gornaya 60, tel. 8 921 151 3991, 8 921 667 5920.
- Stuffed Fish Studio 8 921 152 1996
- Department of Preservation and Development of Pomor Traditions and Trades, ul. Belomorskaya 1a, tel. 8 815 59 52385. Open Tue. to Sat. 10am to 6pm (closed for lunch 2pm to 3pm), closed Sun. and Mon.
- Suvoy Tour Agency, the village of Kuzreka, tel. 8 81559 51135, 8 911 319 8973

== See also ==
- Pomors

== Sources ==
- Архивный отдел Администрации Мурманской области. Государственный Архив Мурманской области. (1995). Административно-территориальное деление Мурманской области (1920–1993 гг.). Справочник. Мурманск: Мурманское издательско-полиграфическое предприятие "Север".
