= Onezhsky Uyezd =

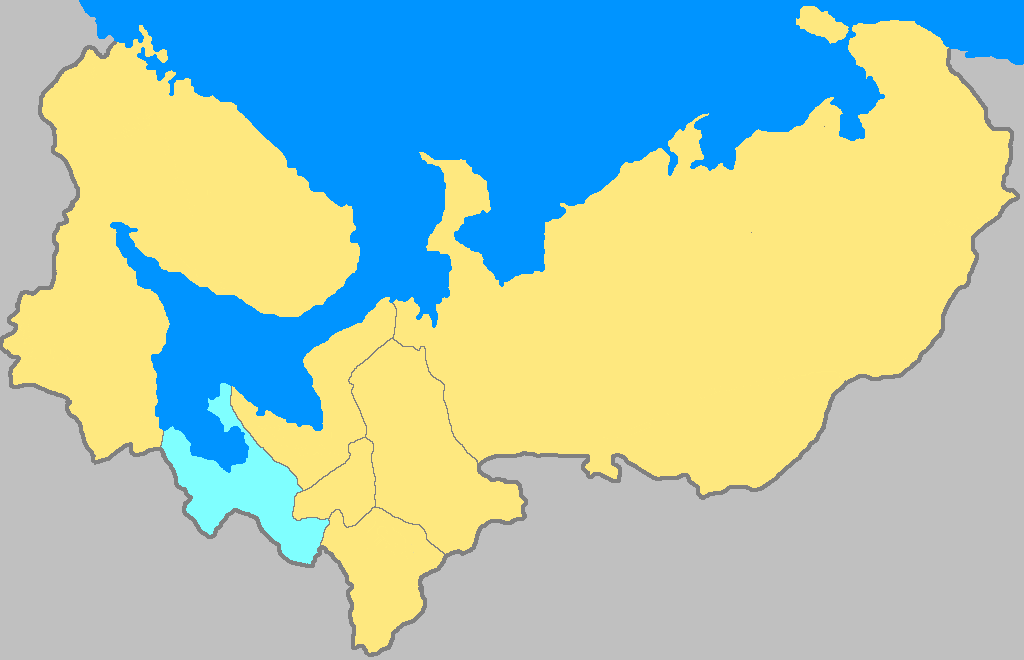

Onezhsky Uyezd (Онежский уезд) was one of the subdivisions of the Arkhangelsk Governorate of the Russian Empire. It was situated in the western part of the governorate. Its administrative centre was Onega.

== Demographics ==
At the time of the Russian Empire Census of 1897, Onezhsky Uyezd had a population of 39,337. Of these, 99.6% spoke Russian, 0.1% Polish and 0.1% Romani as their native language.
