= Kuzomen, Murmansk Oblast =

Kuzomen Кузомень
- Selo
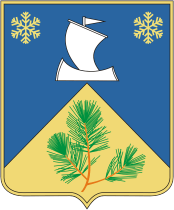
- Coat of arms
- Interactive map of Kuzomen
- Location of Kuzomen Kuzomen (Murmansk Oblast)
- Coordinates: 66°17′11″N 36°52′00″E
- Country: Russia
- Federal subject: Murmansk Oblast
- Administrative district: Tersky District

Population (2010 Census)
  - Total: 84
  - Estimate (2021): 94 (+11.9%)

Municipal status
  - Municipal district: Tersky Municipal District
  - Rural settlement: Varzuga Rural Settlement
- Time zone: UTC+3 (MSK)
- Postal code: 184713
- Dialing code: +7 81559
- OKTMO ID: 47620401111

Kuzomen (Russian: Кузомень) is a rural locality (a selo) in Tersky District of Murmansk Oblast, Russia, located on the Kola Peninsula at a height of 11 meters (36 ft) above sea level. Population: 84 (2010 Census).
