= Vologda Viceroyalty =

1780–1796 unit of Russia

Coordinates: 59.215°N 39.877°E

Vologda Viceroyalty Волого́дское наме́стничество
- Viceroyalty of Russian Empire
- 1780–1796
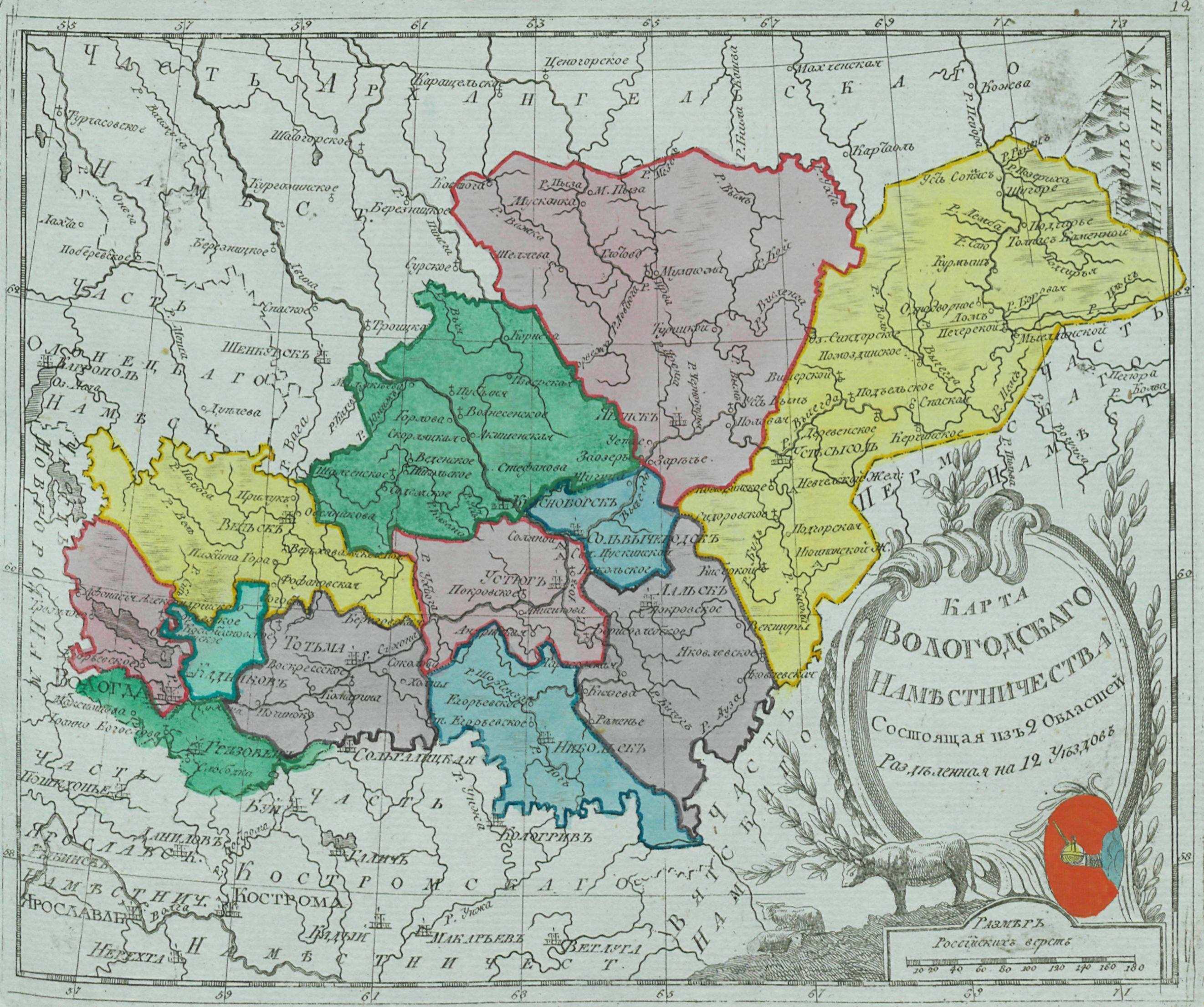
- Map of the governorate in 1792
- Capital: Vologda
- History
  - Established: February 5 [O.S. January 25] 1780
  - Disestablished: December 23 [O.S. December 12] 1796
Preceded by	Succeeded by
Archangelgorod Governorate	Vologda Governorate; Arkhangelsk Governorate

Vologda Viceroyalty (Russian: Волого́дское наме́стничество, romanized: Vologodskoye namestnichestvo) was an administrative-territorial unit (namestnichestvo) of the Russian Empire, which existed in 1780–1796. The seat of the Viceroyalty was located in Vologda.

The viceroyalty was established by a decree (ukase) of Catherine II on February 5 [O.S. January 25], 1780. It was subdivided into three oblasts: Vologda, Veliky Ustyug, and Arkhangelsk. The predecessor of Vologda Viceroyalty was Archangelgorod Governorate with the seat in Arkhangelsk.

As with most of other governorates and viceroyalties established in the 1770s–1780s, the establishment of Vologda Viceroyalty was a part of the reform attempting to have a tighter control of local matters by the Russian autocracy. The reform, in turn, was facilitated by the Pugachev's Rebellion of 1774–1775.

On March 26, 1784 Arkhangelsk Oblast was split off and established as Arkhangelsk Viceroyalty.

Between 1784 and 1796, Vologda Viceroyalty bordered Arkhangelsk Viceroyalty in the north, Tobolsk Viceroyalty in the northeast, Perm Viceroyalty in the east, Vyatka Viceroyalty in the southeast, Kostroma and Yaroslavl Viceroyalties in the south, Novgorod Viceroyalty in the southwest, and Olonets Viceroyalty in the west. In terms of the modern political division of Russia, Vologda Viceroyalty in this period comprised the areas of what is currently the greater part of Vologda Oblast, as well as parts of the Komi Republic, Kostroma, Kirov, and Nizhny Novgorod Oblasts.

The viceroyalty was abolished by Paul I's decree on December 23 [O.S. December 12], 1796. On the territory of the viceroyalty (Vologda and Veliky Ustyug Oblasts) Vologda Governorate was established.

== Governors ==
The administration of the viceroyalty was performed by a namestnik (vice-roy) and controlled by a governor general. The governors of Vologda Viceroyalty were

- 1780-1788 Alexey Petrovich Melgunov;
- 1788-1793 Evgeniy Petrovich Kashkin;
- 1794-1796 Pyotr Vasilyevich Lopukhin.

The namestniks were

- 1780-1784 Grigoriy Dmitriyevich Makarov;
- 1784-1792 Pyotr Fyodorovich Mezentsov;
- 1793-1796 Nikolay Dmitriyevich Shetnev.
