= Kola, Russia =

Town in Murmansk Oblast, Russia

Kola Кола
- Town
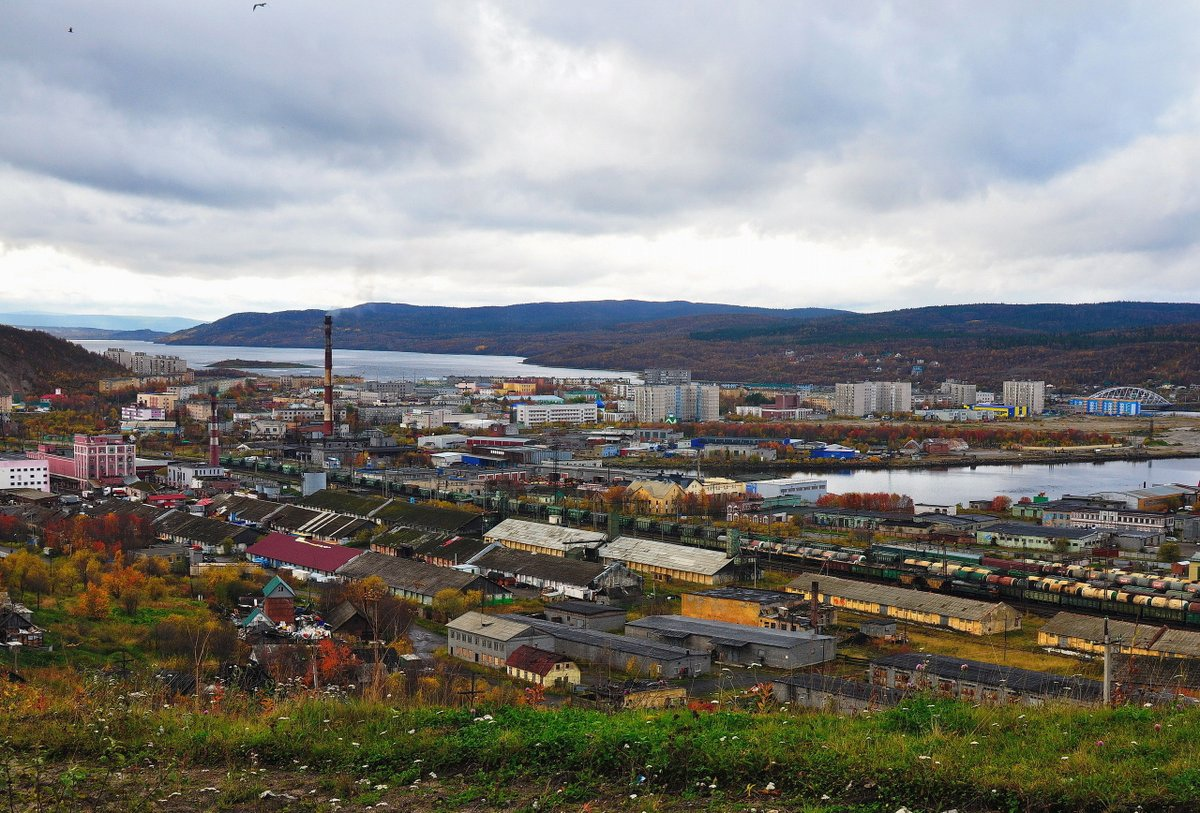
- View of the town of Kola

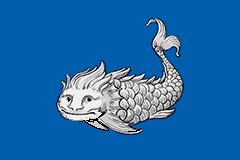
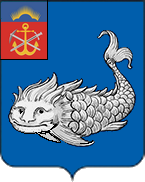
- Flag Coat of arms
- Interactive map of Kola
- Location of Kola Kola (Murmansk Oblast)
- Coordinates: 68°53′N 33°05′E
- Country: Russia
- Federal subject: Murmansk Oblast
- Administrative district: Kolsky District
- Founded: 1565
- Town status since: August 2, 1965
- Elevation: 60 m (200 ft)

Population (2010 Census)
  - Total: 10,437
  - Estimate (2023): 8,933 (−14.4%)

Administrative status
  - Capital of: Kolsky District

Municipal status
  - Municipal district: Kolsky Municipal District
  - Urban settlement: Kola Urban Settlement
  - Capital of: Kola Urban Settlement
- Time zone: UTC+3 (MSK)
- Postal code: 184380
- Dialing code: +7 81553
- OKTMO ID: 47605101001

Kola (Russian: Ко́ла; Northern Sami: Guoládat; Skolt Sami: Kuâlõk) is a town and the administrative center of Kolsky District of Murmansk Oblast, Russia, located at the confluence of the Kola and Tuloma Rivers, 12 kilometers (7.5 mi) south of Murmansk and 24 kilometers (15 mi) southwest of Severomorsk. It is the oldest town of the Kola Peninsula. Population: 10,437 (2010 census); 11,060 (2002 Census); 16,541 (1989 Soviet census).

== History ==
The district of Kolo was first attested in Russian chronicles in 1264. The first documented mention of the town itself dates to 1565— the area was settled by the Pomors, who built the fort of Kola also called Malmus (Russian: Мальмус).

Over time, Sweden extracted the Kola Peninsula from both Russia and Denmark-Norway in a series of wars and resulting treaties. However, in the later Treaty of Teusina in 1595, Sweden acknowledged Russian rights in Kola. Claims from Denmark-Norway remained, however, and in 1582, a Russian voivode was appointed to Kola to provide for better defenses of the peninsula. The voivode governed the territory which became known as Kolsky Uyezd.

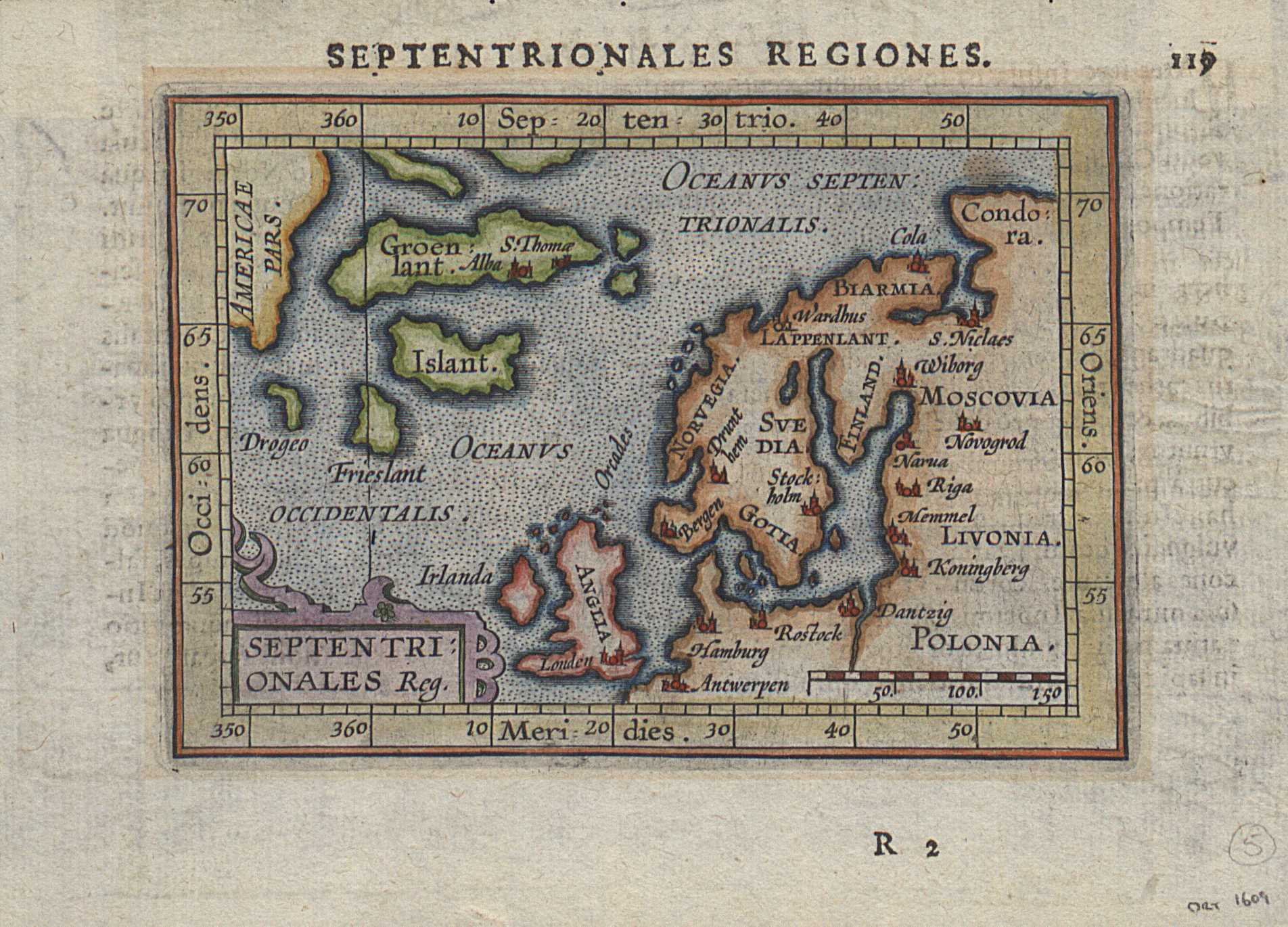
Kola on the 1601 Dutch map of Northern Europe

During the Russo-Swedish War of 1590–1595, the Swedes failed to capture the fort. In the 17th century, it prospered as a starting point for naval expeditions of the Pomors to Spitzbergen and Novaya Zemlya. The brethren of the Pechenga Monastery moved there as well.

Although it was incorporated as a town in 1784, Kola declined after Russia gained access to the Baltic Sea, and was used by the Tsarist government as a place of exile. Kola was destroyed by a twenty-hour bombardment in 1854 by a three-ship squadron led by the Royal Navy sloop HMS Miranda, at the time of Crimean War. As a consequence, Kolsky Uyezd was abolished and merged into Kemsky Uyezd. Kola, while retaining its town rights, lost the status of the center of the uyezd to Kem. The ruined town was later eclipsed by nearby Murmansk, of which it is now commonly considered to be a satellite.

On October 16, 1925—when the Murmansk Governorate Commission meeting initiated work on compiling the lists of the urban and rural localities—Murmansk, Alexandrovsk, and Kola were categorized as urban; however, a recommendation was sent to the All-Russian Central Executive Committee (VTsIK) to demote the latter two to rural localities due to economic conditions, sparse population, low trade volume, lack of industrial enterprises, and "general regress". On March 15, 1926, the VTsIK approved the recommendation, and Alexandrovsk and Kola were re-categorized as rural localities.

At the end of 1934, the Murmansk Okrug Executive Committee developed a plan to enlarge the city of Murmansk by merging surrounding territories into it. Kola was one of the rural localities slated for this merger, and a settlement soviet subordinated to Murmansk was planned to be organized on its territory. The plan was not confirmed by the Leningrad Oblast Executive Committee, but Kola was re-classified as an urban locality by the VTsIK Resolution of August 20, 1935, when it was granted work settlement status. It retained this status until it was granted the status of a town under district jurisdiction by the August 2, 1965 Presidium of the Supreme Soviet of the RSFSR Decree.

== Landmarks ==
Although earthen ramparts and ditches of the original fortress still survive, Kola's main landmark is the Annunciation Cathedral (1800–1809), which may have been the first stone building constructed in the Kola Peninsula. Other sights include the Museum of Pomor Way of Life and Murmashi, the northernmost spa in Russia.

== Sources ==
- Архивный отдел Администрации Мурманской области. Государственный Архив Мурманской области. (1995). Административно-территориальное деление Мурманской области (1920-1993 гг.). Справочник. Мурманск: Мурманское издательско-полиграфическое предприятие "Север".
- Frederick Bernard Singleton, Anthony F. Upton (1998). A short history of Finland. Cambridge University Press. pp. 36–37. ISBN 0-521-64701-0.
