= Kemsky Uyezd =

Kemsky Uyezd (Ке́мский уе́зд) was one of the subdivisions of the Arkhangelsk Governorate of the Russian Empire. It was situated in the western part of the governorate. Its administrative centre was Kem. In terms of present-day administrative borders, the territory of Kemsky Uyezd is divided between the Belomorsky, Kalevalsky, Kemsky and Loukhsky districts and the city of Kostomuksha of the Republic of Karelia, Kandalakshsky District of Murmansk Oblast and Solovetsky District of Arkhangelsk Oblast.

== Demographics ==
At the time of the Russian Empire Census of 1897, Kemsky Uyezd had a population of 35 392. Of these, 54.4% spoke Karelian, 45.0% Russian and 0.5% Finnish as their native language.
