= Arkhangelsk Governorate =

1796–1929 unit of Russia

Coordinates: 64°32′N 40°32′E

Arkhangelsk Governorate Архангельская губерния
- Governorate of the Russian Empire, Russian Republic, Soviet Russia
- 1796–1929
- Coat of arms

- Location in the Russian Empire
- Capital: Arkhangelsk
- History
  - Established: 12 December 1796
  - Disestablished: 14 January 1929
- Political subdivisions: nine uyezds
Preceded by	Succeeded by
Vologda Viceroyalty	Northern Krai

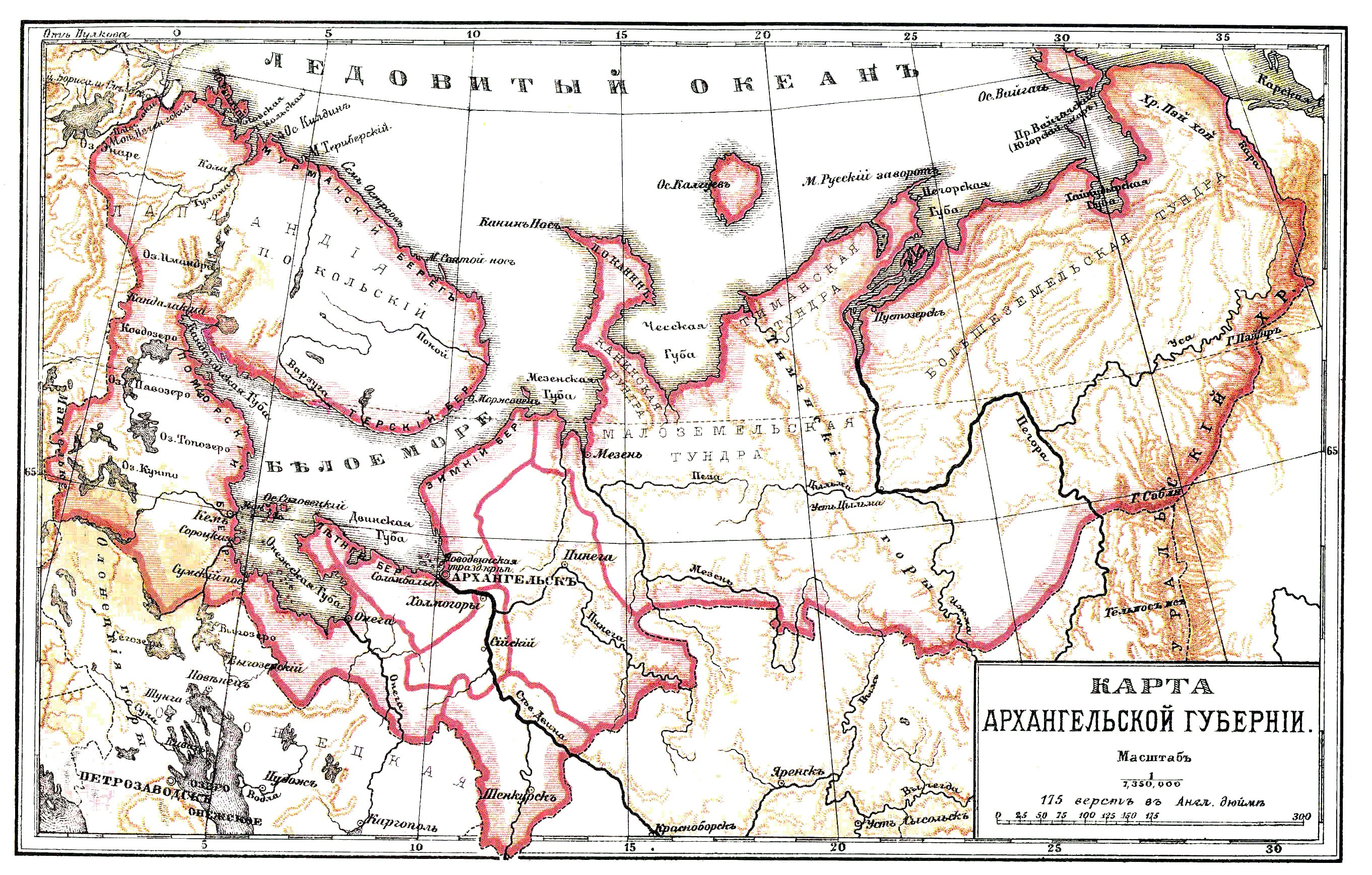

Arkhangelsk Governorate (Russian: Архангельская губерния, romanized: Arkhangel'skaya guberniya) was an administrative-territorial unit (guberniya) of the Russian Empire and the Russian SFSR, which existed from 1796 until 1929. Its seat was in Arkhangelsk. The governorate was located in the north of the Russian Empire and bordered Tobolsk Governorate in the east, Vologda Governorate in the south, Olonets Governorate in the southwest, Sweden (later Grand Duchy of Finland and later independent Finland) in the west, and Norway in north-west. In the north, the governorate was limited by the White and Barents Seas.

The area of the governorate is currently split between Arkhangelsk and Murmansk Oblasts, the Komi Republic, the Republic of Karelia, and the Nenets Autonomous Okrug.

== History ==
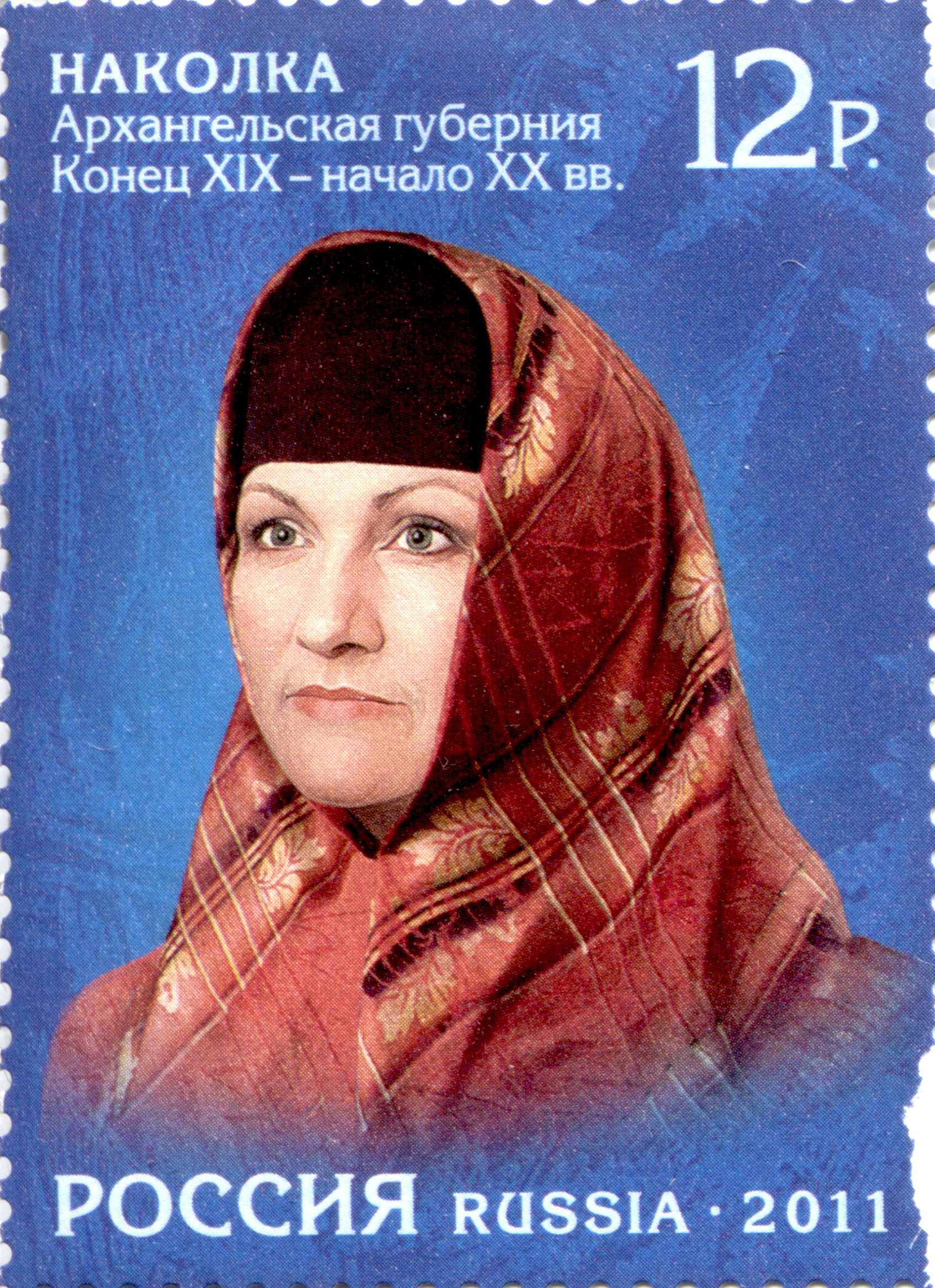
Female headgear "Nakolka". Arkhangelsk Governorate, late 19th – early 20th century.

In 1780, the Archangelgorod Governorate, with its center in Arkhangelsk, was abolished and transformed into the Vologda Viceroyalty. The viceroyalty was subdivided into three oblasts: Vologda, Veliky Ustyug, and Arkhangelsk. On 26 March 1784, the Arkhangelsk Oblast was split off and formed into the Arkhangelsk Viceroyalty. Tsar Paul I on 12 December 1796 issued a decree remaining Arkhangelsk Viceroyalty into Arkhangelsk Governorate. Simultaneously, the Olonets Viceroyalty was abolished, and the Kemsky Uyezd and about a half of the Povenetsky Uyezd were transferred to the Arkhangelsk Governorate.

In 1780, the Arkhangelsk Oblast (and later the Arkhangelsk Viceroyalty) was subdivided into seven uyezds (the administrative centers, which all had the town status, are given in parentheses),

- Arkhangelsky Uyezd (Arkhangelsk)
- Kholmogorsky Uyezd (Kholmogory)
- Kolsky Uyezd (Kola)
- Mezensky Uyezd (Mezen)
- Onezhsky Uyezd (Onega)
- Pinezhsky Uyezd (Pinega)
- Shenkursky Uyezd (Shenkursk)

Mezen, Onega, and Pinega were incorporated as towns in 1780 just to become the uyezd towns. Kola was incorporated in 1784.

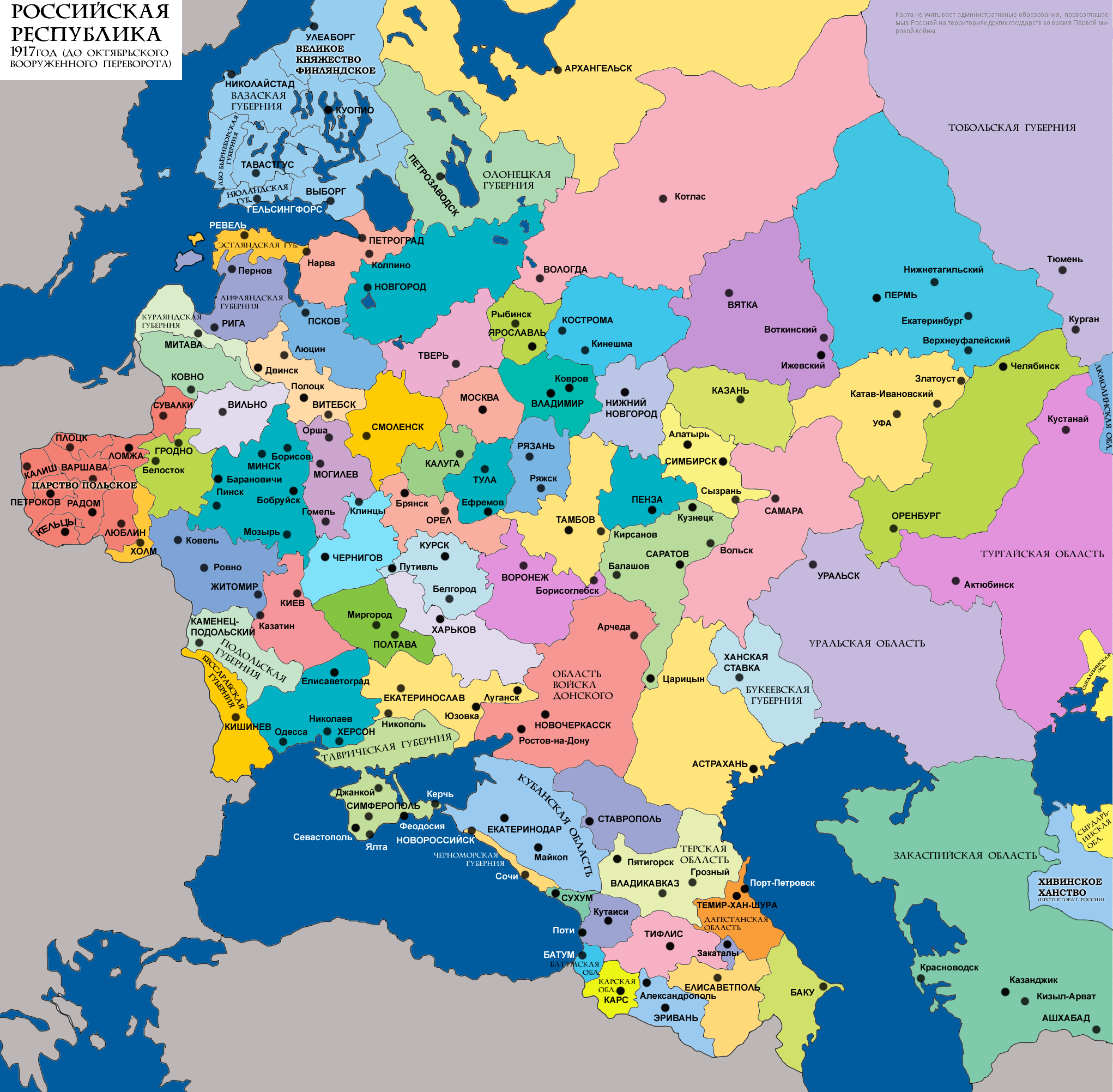
The European part of the Russian Empire in 1917. Arkhangelsk Governorate is shown in yellow on top of the map.

In 1801, portions of the Povenetsky Uyezd were transferred to the Olonets Governorate, while the Kemsky Uyezd, with its center in Kem, was left to remain in the Arkhangelsk Governorate. In 1854, the town of Kola was destroyed during the Crimean War, and Kolsky Uyezd was merged into the Kemsky Uyezd. In 1883, the Kolsky Uyezd was restored, but in 1899, the Uyezds center was transferred to Aleksandrovsk, and the uyezd was renamed to become the Aleksandrovsky Uyezd. In 1891, Pechorsky Uyezd with its center in Ust-Tsilma was split off from the Mezensky Uyezd.

The governorate's structure remained in place after the 1917 revolution. In 1917, the governorate thus comprised nine uyezds. On 2 March 1918, the Ust-Vashsky Uyezd with its center in Ust-Vashka was split off from the Mezensky Uyezd (On 6 February 1922 it was abolished and merged back into the Mezensky Uyezd). Also in 1918, the western part of the Aleksandrovsky Uyezd was transferred to Finland, which became independent, and the rest of the uyezd was incorporated as Murmansk Governorate. In 1920, the Kemsky Uyezd was transferred to the Karel Labour Commune, which later became the Karelian Socialist Soviet Republic. In 1922, the major part of the Pechorsky District was moved to the newly established Komi-Zyryan Autonomous Oblast. On 15 March 1922, the Kholmogorsky Uyezd was renamed into the Yemetsky Uyezd, and the uyezds town was transferred from Kholmogory to Yemetsk.

In the following period, administrative changes in the governorate occurred almost on the yearly basis. In 1928, the governorate consisted of five uyezds: Arkhangelsky, Mezensky, Onezhsky, Pechorsky, and Shenkursky.

On 14 January 1929, by the order of the All-Russian Central Executive Committee, three governorates (Arkhangelsk, Vologda, and Northern Dvina) and Komi-Zyryan Autonomous Oblast were merged into Northern Krai.

== Governors ==
The administration tasks in the vice-royalty were shared between a governor and a governor general; the governorate had a military governor and a (civil) governor; the military governors were not always appointed. Sometimes a governor general was appointed. The governors of Arkhangelogorod Viceroyalty were

- 1784–1796 Ivan Romanovich Liven (Johann Christophor Lieven), a governor
- 1796–1797 Ivan Ilyich Grevens, a governor
- 1784–1793 Timofey Ivanovich Tutolmin, a governor general;
- 1793–1796 Pyotr Konovnitsyn, a governor general;
- 1796 Ivan Romanovich Liven, a governor general.

The governors of Arkhangelsk Governorate were

- 1797 Dmitry Fyodorovich Glinka;
- 1797–1798 Nikolay Isayevich Akhverdov;
- 1798–1799 Nazariy Stepanovich Muravyov;
- 1799–1802 Ivan Fyodorovich Mezentsev;
- 1802 Alexey Matveyevich Okulov;
- 1802–1803 Pyotr Fyodorovich Martyanov, acting governor;
- 1803–1804 Alexandr Matveyevich Veryovkin;
- 1804–1805 Pyotr Fyodorovich Martyanov, acting governor;
- 1805–1807 Kazimir Ash;
- 1807–1823 Andrey Yakovlevich Perfilyev;
- 1823–1824 Nikolay Sergeyevich Tukhachevsky;
- 1824–1827 Yakov Fyodorovich Ganskau;
- 1827–1829 Ivan Yakovlevich Bukharin;
- 1829–1831 Vladimir Sergeyevich Filimonov;
- 1831–1837 Ilya Ivanovich Ogaryov;
- 1837 Viktor Yakovlevich Roslavets;
- 1837 Nikolay Ivanovich Khmelnitsky;
- 1837–1839 Alexander Nikolayevich Muravyov, formerly sentenced as a decembrist;
- 1839–1842 Platon Viktorovich Stepanov;
- 1842–1843 Mikhail Fyodorovich Nozhin, acting governor;
- 1843–1856 Vilem (Vikentiy) Frantsevich Fribers;
- 1856–1863 Nikolay Ivanovich Arandarenko;
- 1863–1866 Nikolay Martynovich Garting;
- 1866 Alexey Gavrilovich Kaznacheyev;
- 1866–1869 Sergey Pavlovich Gagarin;
- 1869–1870 Nikolay Alexandrovich Kachalov;
- 1871–1880 Nikolay Pavlovich Ignatyev;
- 1880–1881 Modest Mavrikiyevich Koniar;
- 1881–1882 Nikolay Mikhaylovich Baranov;
- 1882–1883 Pyotr Alexeyevich Poltoratsky;
- 1883 Nikolay Pavlovich Shchepkin;
- 1883–1885 Konstantin Ivanovich Pashchenko;
- 1885–1893 Nikolay Dmitrievich Golitsyn, later the last Imperial Prime Minister of Russia;
- 1893–1901 Alexander Platonovich Engelgardt;
- 1901–1904 Nikolay Aleksandrovich Rimsky-Korsakov;
- 1904–1905 Nikolay Georgievich fon Byunting (von Bünting);
- 1905–1907 Nikolay Nikolayevich Kachalov;
- 1907–1911 Ivan Vasilyevich Sosnovsky;
- 1911–1917 Sergey Dmitriyevich Bibikov.

After February 1917, the highest authority in the governorate belonged to the Comissar of the Governorate, and after November 1917 – to the Governorate Executive Committee (with the exception of the period of the Civil War in Russia, when Arkhangelsk was occupied by the Entente troops). The governors were not appointed any more.

The military governors of Arkhangelsk Governorate were

- 1797–1798 Ivan Romanovich Liven;
- 1798 Boris Borisovich Letstsano (Lezzano);
- 1798 Dmitry Ivanovich Lobanov-Rostovsky;
- 1798–1799 Dmitry Petrovich Volkonsky;
- 1799–1801 Karl Andreyevich Liven;
- 1802–1803 Sergey Andreyevich Bekleshov;
- 1803–1807 Ivan Petrovich Ferster;
- 1807–1811 Martin Petrovich Dezin;
- 1811–1813 Alexey Grigoryevich Spiridov;
- 1813–1820 Alexey Fedotovich Klokachyov;
- 1842–1850 Alexander Ivanovich Traverse;
- 1850–1854 Roman Platonovich Boil;
- 1854–1857 Stepan Petrovich Khrushchov;
- 1857–1859 Bogdan Alexandrovich Glazenap;
- 1907 Dmitry Davidovich Grigoryev.

The following governors general were appointed,

- 1820–1823 Alexey Fedotovich Klokachyov;
- 1823–1830 Stepan Ivanovich Minitsky;
- 1836–1842 Iosif Ivanovich Sulima;
- 1862–? Konstantin Ivanovich Istomin;
- 1915 Arkady Mikhaylovich Valuyev, acting governor general.

== Demography ==
=== Language ===
- By the Imperial census of 1897.

Language	Number	percentage (%)	males	females
Russian	294 865	85.1	139 174	155 691
Komi	23 259	6.7	11 058	12 201
Karelian	19 522	5.6	8737	10785
Samoyedic	3 874	1.1	2 030	1 844
Sámi	1 742	0.5	870	872
Finnish	1 276	0.4	645	631
Polish	456	0.0	350	106
German	309	0.0	118	191
Belarusian	256	0.0	133	123
Yiddish	253	0.0	156	97
Norwegian and Danish	226	0.0	125	101
Romani	147	0.0	84	63
Lithuanian	81	0.0	80	1
Estonian	76	0.0	70	6
Ukrainian	51	0.0	45	6
Other	143	0.0	109	34
Total	346 536	100.0	163 784	182 752
