= Murman =

Murman may refer to:

== Places ==
- Murman Coast, a coastal area in Murmansk Oblast, Russia
- Murman, the same as the Kola Peninsula, Russia
- Murman Sea, former name of the Barents Sea

== Ships ==
- Saint Andrew (research vessel), renamed Murman in 1910
- Icebreaker Murman, see Drifting ice station
- Murman, original name of Rautu-class minesweeper Rautu

== Other ==
- Murman Murmansk, a bandy club in Murmansk, Russia
- Murman Scientific Fisheries Expedition, earlier name of the Nikolai M. Knipovich Polar Research Institute of Marine Fisheries and Oceanography
- Murman Railway, the original name of the Kirov Railway connecting Saint Petersburg with Murmansk

== People with the given name ==
- Murman Dumbadze (born 1960), Georgian politician
- Murman Omanidze (1938–2020), Georgian politician

== See also ==
- Moorman (disambiguation)
- Moerman (disambiguation)
- Murmansk (disambiguation)
