= Murmansk (disambiguation) =

Murmansk is a city in Russia.

Murmansk may also refer to:

- Murmansk Oblast (est. 1938), a federal subject of Russia
- Murmansk Okrug (1927–1938), an administrative division of Leningrad Oblast in the Russian SFSR, Soviet Union
- Murmansk Governorate (1921–1927), an administrative division of the Russian SFSR, Soviet Union
- Murmansk Governorate (1920), an administrative division established by the White Government in Russia in 1920
- Murmansk Krai, an informal name used in the Russian SFSR to refer to the territory of modern Murmansk Oblast
- 2979 Murmansk, a main-belt asteroid

== Ships ==
- Soviet cruiser Murmansk, name of two cruisers
- Murmansk (1968 icebreaker), a Soviet and later Russian diesel-electric icebreaker built at Hietalahti shipyard, in service in 1968–1995
- Murmansk (2015 icebreaker), a Russian diesel-electric icebreaker built in 2015
