= Severnaya Oblast =

Severnaya Oblast may refer to:

- Provisional Government of the Northern Region
- Supreme Administration of the Northern Region
