= Northern Oblast =

Northern Oblast may refer to:

- Supreme Administration of the Northern Region, a White movement, Anti-Bolshevik left-wing, and Allied government in 1918, which transformed into Provisional Government of the Northern Region
- Provisional Government of the Northern Region, krai of the Provisional All-Russian Government in 1918-1920
- Northern Oblast (1933–1934), an administrative division in the North Caucasus, RSFSR
- Northern Oblast (1936–1937), an administrative division in the northwest of the RSFSR
