= Mormon (disambiguation) =

Mormons are people who are members of a religious group that is part of Mormonism and the Latter Day Saint movement.

Mormon may also refer to:

== Religion ==
- Mormon (word), informal term for a follower or constituent of the Latter-Day Saint movement
- Mormonism, term for Christian theologies which accept the Book of Mormon, common to the Latter-Day Saint movement
- The Church of Jesus Christ of Latter-day Saints, also known as the "LDS Church" or "Mormon Church", the largest and most prominent faith within the Latter Day Saint movement
- Latter-Day Saint movement, the group of faiths tracing their origin to Joseph Smith Jr.
- Mormon studies, the academic discipline involving scholarship about Mormons
- Mormon fundamentalism, branches of the Latter-Day Saint movement which continue to practice polygamy
- Jack Mormon, slang for an unbaptized Mormon sympathizer or a Mormon member who is not fully devout

=== Literature ===
- Book of Mormon, one of the sacred books within the Church of Jesus Christ of Latter-day Saints, and other "mormon-based" religious sects.
  - Mormon (Book of Mormon prophet), a prophet and narrator figure within the Book of Mormon; the original meaning of the term “Mormon”
  - Waters of Mormon, fountain of "pure water" where Alma the Elder preaches and baptizes in secret
  - Book of Mormon (Mormon's record), one of several "books" within the Book of Mormon
  - Words of Mormon, another “book” within the Book of Mormon

== Places ==
- Mormon, California, an unincorporated community in San Joaquin County, California, US

== Arts and entertainment ==
- The Mormons (miniseries), a 2007 PBS documentary about The Church of Jesus Christ of Latter-Day Saints

== Butterflies ==
- "Mormon" is part of the common name of several butterflies in the genus Papilio, in particular:
  - Andaman Mormon (Papilio mayo) found in the Adamans
  - Great Mormon (Papilio memnon), endemic to Indochina and Japan
  - Blue Mormon (Papilio polymnestor), endemic to parts of India
  - Common Mormon (Papilio polytes), endemic to India, the Himalayas, parts of China, and Indochina
  - Scarlet Mormon (Papilio rumanzovia), endemic to the Philippines and Celebes

== Other uses ==
- 'Mormon tea', a name for plants of the genus Ephedra
- Anabrus simplex, the Mormon cricket
- Sphenophorus mormon, a species of beetle in the family Dryophthoridae
- Mopsus mormon is an Australian spider species of the family Salticidae (jumping spiders)
- inflected form of Mormo (Greek: Μορμώ, Μορμών, Mormō), a female spirit in Greek folklore

== See also ==
- List of sects in the Latter Day Saint movement
- Moerman (disambiguation)
- Moorman (disambiguation) (also shows entries for “Moormann”)
- Morman
