= Perseus (Soviet ship) =

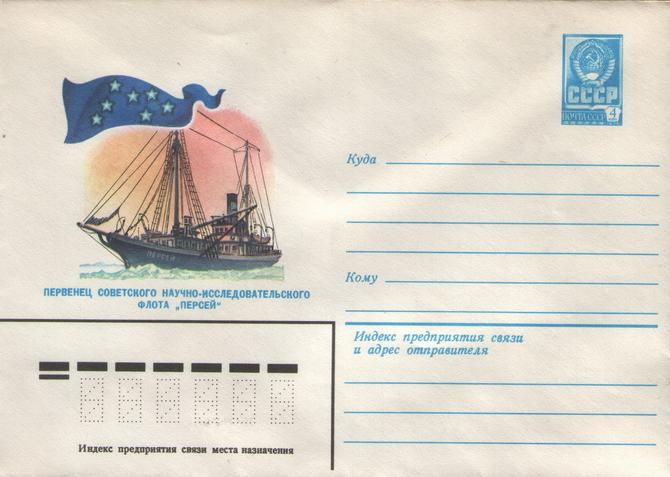
- 1979 Soviet illustrated postal envelope showing Perseus and its banner

History

USSR
- Completed: 1922
- Maiden voyage: 1923
- In service: 1922
- Out of service: 1941

General characteristics
- Type: Research vessel
- Displacement: 550 tons
- Length: 41.5 metres (136 ft)
- Beam: 8 metres (26 ft)
- Draft: 3.2 metres (10 ft)
- Installed power: 360 hp
- Propulsion: triple expansion steam engine
- Speed: 7.5 knots
- Crew: 24, of which 16 expedition members

Perseus (Russian: Персей) was the first Soviet research ship. (It was not the first Russian research ship, that being the Imperial Russian ship Saint Andrew, which undertook expeditions under the direction of fisheries research pioneer Nikolai Knipovich (and later L. L. Breytfus) from 1899 to 1907.)

Perseus was constructed as a sealer (seal hunting ship) by industrialist E. V. Mogučim at Onega, Russia on the White Sea in 1916. In 1919 (political conditions and thus ownership having changed) it was towed to Arkhangelsk where on January 10 of 1922 the Council of Labor and Defense transferred it to PINRO (Russian: ПИНРО), the Nikolai M. Knipovich Polar Research Institute of Marine Fisheries and Oceanography, which equipped it as a research vessel under supervision of the ship's master V. F. Gostev and the first director of the Institute, Ivan Illarionovich Mesjacev. The work was done by shipbuilders and future famous scientists Lev Zenkevich, Vasily Shuleikin, Maria Klenova, and Nikolay Zubov (who later became a Rear Admiral), all of whom later participated in voyages on Perseus.

On November 7, 1922, the national flag of the Russian Soviet Federated Socialist Republic was raised at the stern of Perseus, and on February 1, 1923 the vessel's unique flag – a blue pennant with the seven stars of the Perseus constellation – was first flown from the mast. (Since then, this pennant has become the emblem of PINRO.) On 19 August 1923, Perseus began its first scientific voyage.

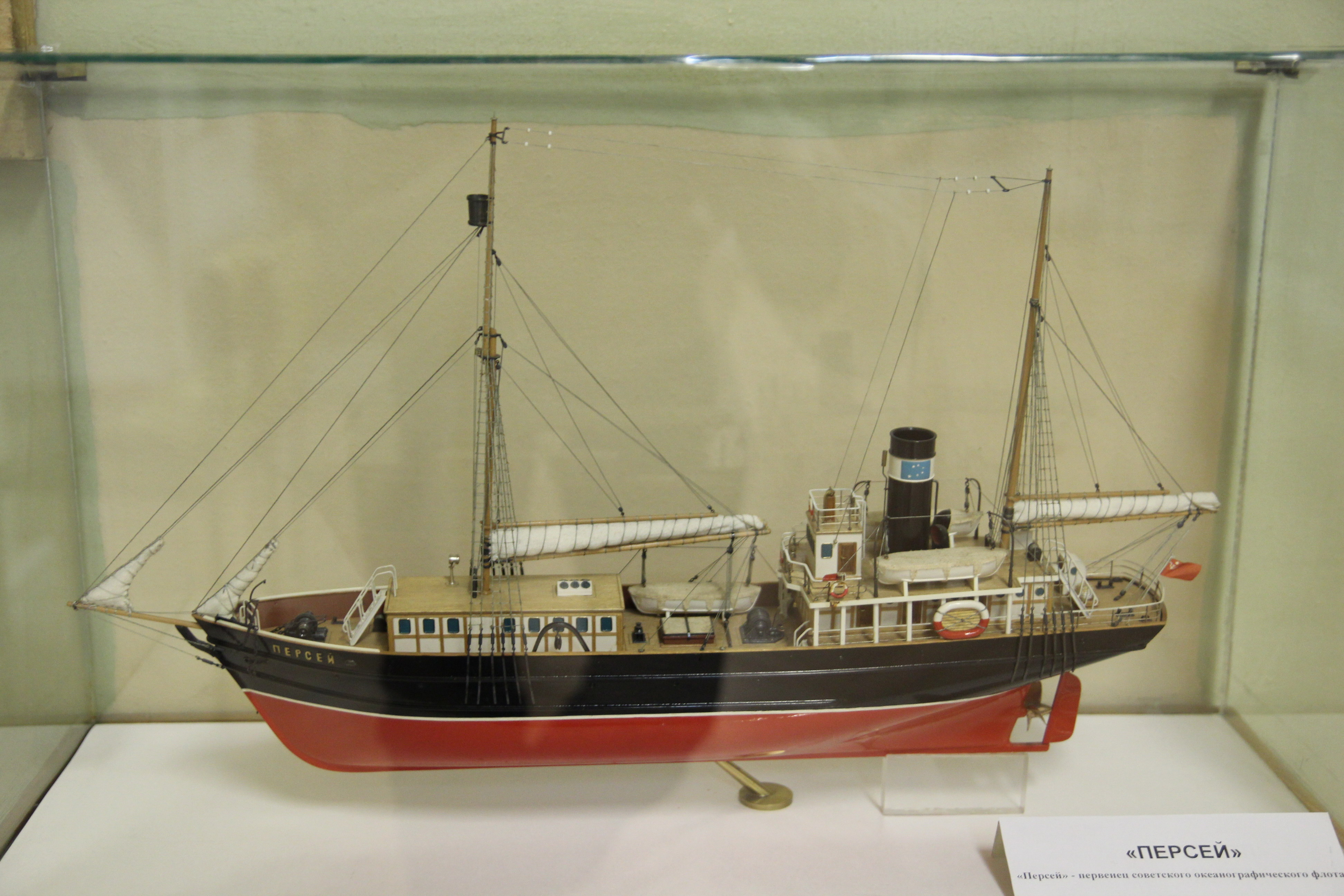
Model of Perseus in the Murmansk Region Museum

Over the years of its voyages, Perseus undertook many expeditions (between 80 and 99, according to various estimates) in the northern seas – the Barents Sea, Greenland, the Kara Sea, and the coasts of Novaya Zemlya, Franz Josef Land, Jan Mayen, and Svalbard. It took part in the international search for the airship Italia of Umberto Nobile's ill-fated second North Pole expedition. The ship conducted hydrological, scientific, and commercial research, including programs of the second International Polar Year (1932-1933). Through its study of the arms of the Arctic Ocean, Perseus led the way for later Soviet expeditions to all the world's oceans.

On July 10, 1941 (during the opening weeks of the Russian Campaign of World War II (called, in Russia, the Great Patriotic War)), the Luftwaffe sank Perseus in Motovsky Gulf, in shallow water just south of the Rybachy Peninsula, while she carried supplies to the garrisons there.

Soviet scientist Sergei Obruchev (son of Vladimir Obruchev) wrote a hymn "Perseus" which contains this quatrain:

And let Perseus' pennant proud
– Slash of sky and stars in cloud –
Above the polar oceans soar
Now, tomorrow, and forevermore.

A memorial stele was erected to Perseus in the town of Onega in 1979.

Later vessels were named in Perseus's honor. Perseus 2 was a converted minesweeper (built in 1944) received as German war reparations. After 176 voyages (mainly in the Barents Sea), that introduced many new technologies and greatly advanced Soviet fishery science, it was retired in 1967. In 1969 a much larger purpose-built research ship, Perseus III, began service with PINRO. Perseus III was transferred from PINRO to Vega (an R&D organization supporting Russian fisheries) in 1991 and decommissioned in 2007.
