= Moerman =

Moerman is a Dutch surname. Moer was the name for a bog where peat was harvested. A moerman could have referred to a peat harvester or trader, or a person living near such a region. Notable people with this surname include:

- Adrien Moerman (born 1988), French basketball player
- Cornelis Moerman (1893–1988), Dutch physician
  - Moerman Therapy, a diet he claimed to be a cancer treatment
- Daniel Moerman (born 1941), American medical anthropologist
- Ernst Moerman (1897–1944), Belgian writer and film director
- Fientje Moerman (born 1958), Belgian liberal politician
- Francis-Alfred Moerman (1936–2010), Belgian-born French gypsy jazz guitarist
- Gerben Moerman, (born 1959) Dutch sociologist
- Ingrid Moerman (born 1965), Belgian electrical engineer
- Jan Moerman (1850–1896), Belgian genre painter
- Jean-Paul Moerman (born 1952), Belgian Walloon politician

== See also ==
- Moorman (disambiguation)
- Morman
- Mormon (disambiguation)
- Murman (disambiguation)
