= Moorman =

Moorman or Moormann may refer to:

- Moorman, Kentucky, a census-designated place (CDP) in Muhlenberg County, United States
- Bernard H. Moormann House, a historic residence in eastern Cincinnati, Ohio, United States
- a Sri Lankan Moor

== People ==
=== Moorman ===
- Brian Moorman (born 1976), American football player
- Charlotte Moorman (1933–1991), American cellist and performance artist
- Charles Moorman (born 1953), American businessman
- Chris Moorman (born 1985), British professional poker player
- John Moorman (1905–1989), English Anglican bishop and ecumenist
- Joyce Solomon Moorman (born 1946), American composer and educator
- Marjolein Moorman (born 1974), Dutch politician
- Mary Moorman (born 1932), witness to the assassination of U.S. President John F. Kennedy
- Mo Moorman (born 1945), American football player
- Robert Moorman (1814 – 1873), American politician

=== Moormann ===
- Rainer Moormann (born 1950), German chemist and nuclear whistleblower
- Sarah Moormann Scharper (1920-1992), actress, director, teacher, writer and lecturer
- Paul Schmitz-Moormann (known as Kid Paul; born 1975), German DJ, and acid house and trance musician

== See also ==
- Moerman (disambiguation)
- Morman (died 818), Breton chieftain
- Mormon (disambiguation)
- Murman (disambiguation)
