= Lycenchelys sarsii =

Scientific classification
- Kingdom: Animalia
- Phylum: Chordata
- Class: Actinopterygii
- Order: Perciformes
- Family: Zoarcidae
- Genus: Lycenchelys
- Species: L. sarsii

Binomial name
- Lycenchelys sarsii (Collett, 1871)

Synonyms
- Lycodes sarsii Collett, 1871; Lycenchelys sarsi septentrionalis Knipowitsch, 1906

Species of fish

Lycenchelys sarsii, Sar's wolf eel, is a species of marine ray-finned fish belonging to the family Zoarcidae, the eelpouts.

It is native to coasts of Northern Atlantic Ocean.
