= Murmansk Krai =

1918–1920 unit of Russia

Murmansk Krai (Russian: Му́рманский край) was an informal name used in the early Russian SFSR to refer to the territory roughly corresponding to modern Murmansk Oblast. At various times, the term referred to the territory which included Alexandrovsky and Kemsky Uyezds of Arkhangelsk Governorate and some parts of Olonets Governorate.

== History ==
=== 1917-18 ===
The first references to Murmansk Krai date back to the period after the February Revolution when the power in the region was assumed by the Murmansk Soviet of the Workers' and Soldiers' Deputies. On October 27 [O.S. November 9], 1917, the Soviet transferred all the power to the newly created Murmansk Provisional Revolutionary Committee; however, after the joint assembly of the Murmansk Soviet with the representatives of the local democratic organizations on November 17 [O.S. December 2], 1917, the Revolutionary Committee was dismissed and all power was returned to the Soviet.

On February 18, 1918, the Arkhangelsk Governorate Congress of Deputies declared the town of Murmansk the center of Murmansk Krai, and in terms of self-government recognized its independence from Arkhangelsk Governorate. It emphasized that Arkhangelsk Soviet of Deputies has no authority over the Murmansk Soviet and that the latter is directly subordinated to the All-Russian Central Executive Committee and the Council of People's Commissars of the Russian SFSR.

On May 2, 1918, the Council of People's Commissars considered a formal separation of Murmansk Krai from Arkhangelsk Governorate, and while the separation was found to be desirable, the final decision had been postponed.

In June 1918, the Murmansk Krai Soviet reached an agreement with the representatives of the Allies, and the foreign armies disembarked on the krai's territory. On August 2, 1918, Soviet power fell in Arkhangelsk, and the Provisional Government of the Northern Oblast was established instead. On August 6, 1918, the Murmansk Krai Soviet authorized Chairman Yuryev to agree on the inclusion of Murmansk Krai (Alexandrovsky and Kemsky Uyezds of Arkhangelsk Governorate, a part of Olonets Governorate, and some other territories) into Northern Oblast. On September 15, 1918, the Provisional Government issued a resolution which accepted Murmansk Krai as a part of Northern Oblast. In October 1918, they also abolished all the soviets and restored zemstvos.

=== 1920 ===
On February 2, 1920, the Provisional Government of the Northern Region issued a resolution establishing Murmansk Governorate, which included Alexandrovsky and Kemsky Uyezds of Arkhangelsk Governorate and parts of Olonets Governorate. The governorate, however, proved to be short-lived and was abolished after the Soviet power on the Kola Peninsula was restored on February 21, 1920. Alexandrovsky and Kemsky Uyezds were restored in their 1917 borders.
