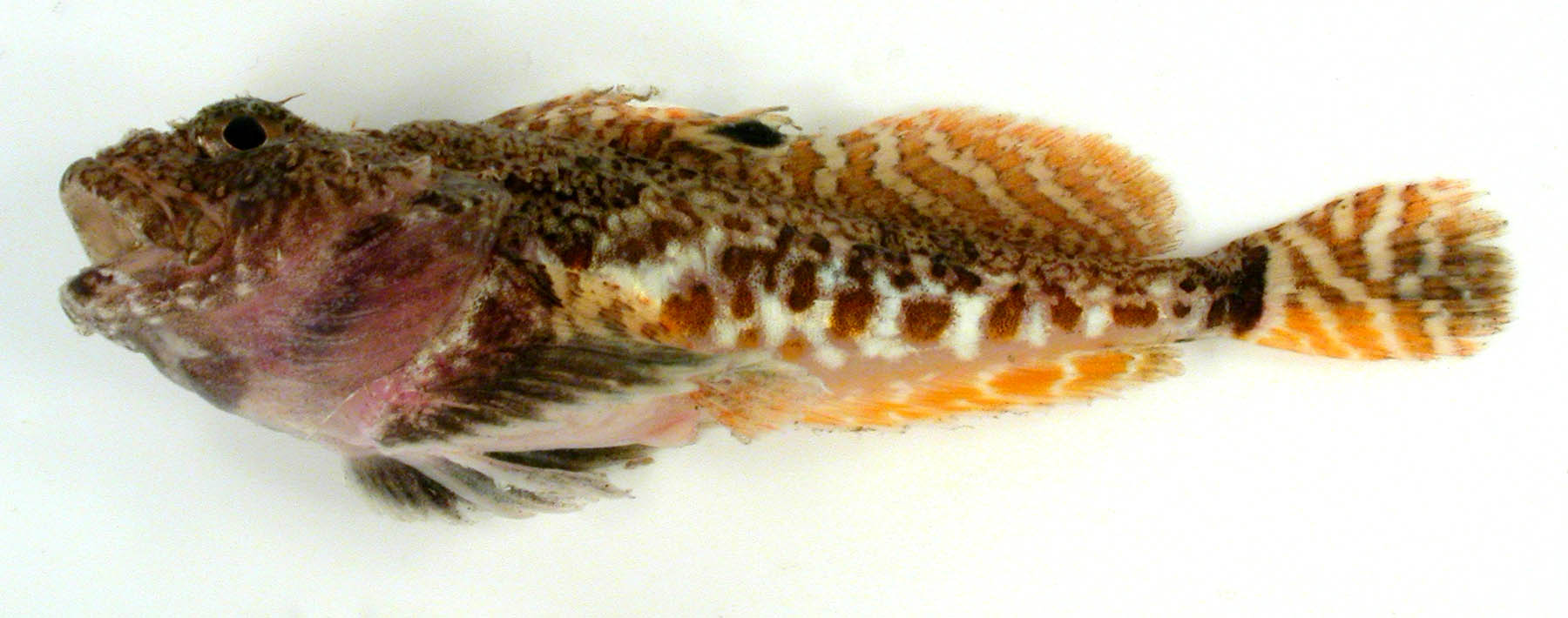
- Hamecon (A. scaber)
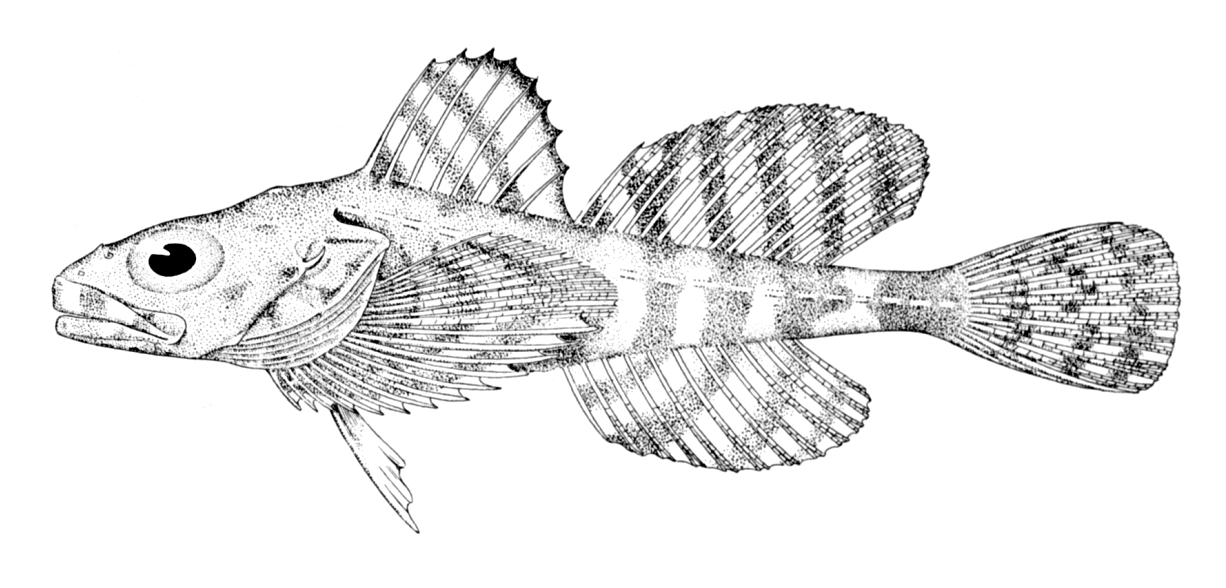
- Arctic Hookear Sculpin (A. unicinatus)

Scientific classification
- Kingdom: Animalia
- Phylum: Chordata
- Class: Actinopterygii
- Order: Perciformes
- Suborder: Cottoidei
- Family: Psychrolutidae
- Genus: Artediellus; D. S. Jordan, 1885

Type species
- Cottus uncinatus Reinhardt, 1834

Synonyms
- Artediellops Neelov, 1979; Evermanniana Taranetz, 1935

= Artediellus =

Artediellus Temporal range: Middle Miocene to present

Genus of fishes

Artediellus is a genus of marine ray-finned fishes belonging to the family Psychrolutidae, the marine sculpins. Most of the fishes in this genus are found in the northern Pacific Ocean but they also occur in the Arctic and North Atlantic Oceans.

== Taxonomy ==
Artediellus was first proposed as a monospecific genus in 1885 by the American ichthyologist David Starr Jordan with Cottus uncinatus, which was described in 1834 from Greenland by the Danish zoologist Johan Reinhardt, as its only species and designated as its type species. The 5th edition of Fishes of the World classifies the genus Artediellus within the subfamily Cottinae of the family Cottidae, however, other authors classify the genus within the subfamily Psychrolutinae of the family Psychrolutidae.

== Etymology ==
Artediellus is a diminutive of Artedius, a genus of similar fishes but these do not have the naked body and head of Artediellus.

== Species ==
There are currently fifteen recognized species in this genus, which are split into two subgenera:

- Subgenus Artediellus D. S. Jordan, 1885
  - Artediellus aporosus Soldatov, 1922
  - Artediellus atlanticus D. S. Jordan & Evermann, 1898 (Atlantic hookear sculpin)
  - Artediellus camchaticus C. H. Gilbert & Burke, 1912
  - Artediellus gomojunovi Taranetz, 1933
  - Artediellus ingens D. W. Nelson, 1986
  - Artediellus miacanthus C. H. Gilbert & Burke, 1912
  - Artediellus neyelovi Muto, Yabe & Amaoka, 1994
  - Artediellus ochotensis C. H. Gilbert & Burke, 1912
  - Artediellus pacificus C. H. Gilbert, 1896 (Hookhorn sculpin)
  - Artediellus scaber Knipowitsch, 1907 (Hamecon)
  - Artediellus schmidti Soldatov, 1915
  - Artediellus uncinatus (J. C. H. Reinhardt, 1834) (Arctic hookear sculpin)
- Subgenus Artediellops Neeelov, 1979
  - Artediellus dydymovi Soldatov, 1915
  - Artediellus fuscimentus D. W. Nelson, 1986
  - Artediellus minor (M. Watanabe, 1958)

The fossil species †Artediellus simplex Nazarkin, 2019 is known from the Middle Miocene of Sakhalin, Russia.

== Characteristics ==
Artediellus sculpins have wide heads. They have both vomerine teeth and palatine teeth. They have 2 spines on the preoperculum, the upper spine is the largest and is hooked upwards with no supplementary spines. The skin is smooth and naked. The first, spiny dorsal fin is short and is not incised. These are small fishes with the largest species being A. camchaticus with a maximum published length of 15 cm (5.9 in)while the smallest is A. minor which has a maximum published standard length of 4.1 cm (1.6 in).

== Distribution and habitat ==
Artediellus sculpins Are found mainly in the North Pacific Ocean, although some species are found in the Arctic and Atlantic Oceans. Thesefishes are found from shallow sub tidal waters to depths of 800 m (2,600 ft).
