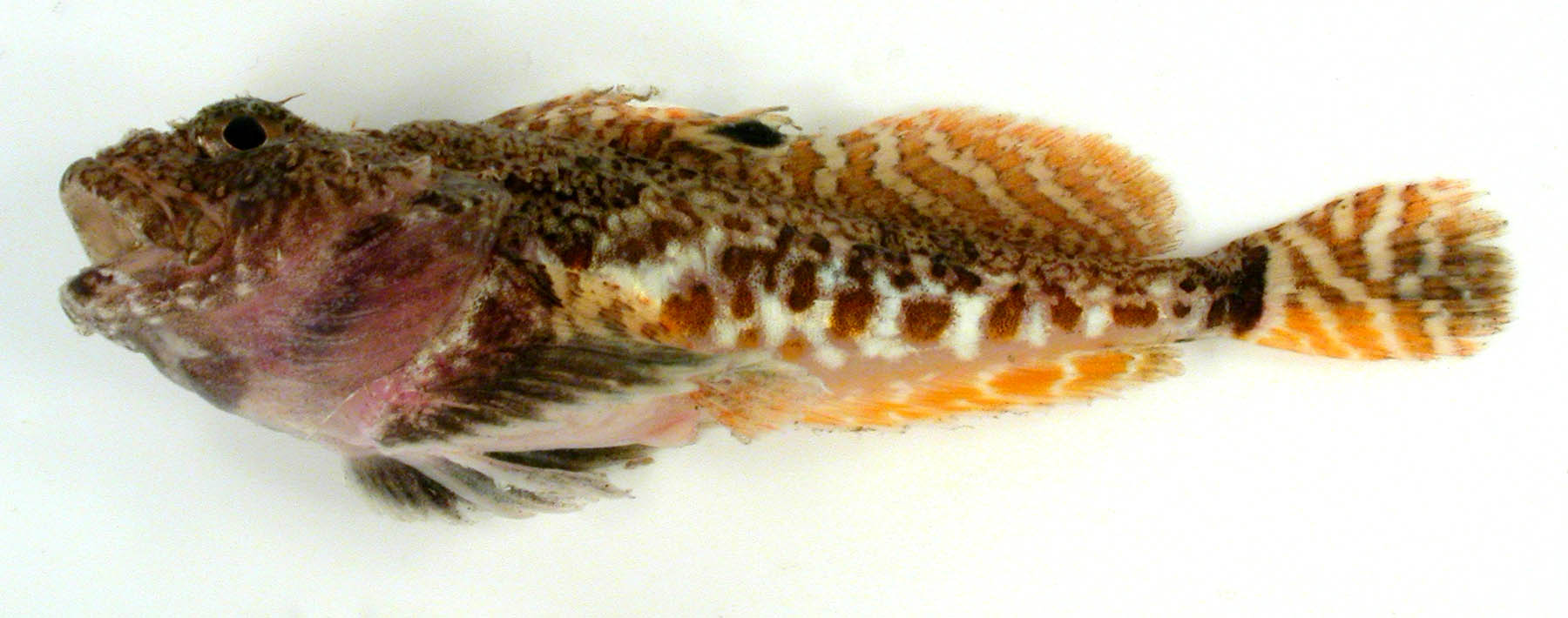

Scientific classification
- Kingdom: Animalia
- Phylum: Chordata
- Class: Actinopterygii
- Order: Perciformes
- Suborder: Cottoidei
- Family: Psychrolutidae
- Genus: Artediellus
- Species: A. scaber

Binomial name
- Artediellus scaber Knipowitsch, 1907

Synonyms
- Artedius scaber (Knipowitsch, 1907); Artediellus scaber beringianus Schmidt, 1927

= Hamecon =

Species of fish

The hamecon (Artediellus scaber) is a species of marine ray-finned fish belonging to the family Cottidae. This species is found along the coasts of northeastern Atlantic Ocean and in the Arctic Ocean.

== Taxonomy ==
The hamecon was first formally described in 1907 by the Russian ichthyologist, marine zoologist and oceanographer Nikolai Knipowitsch with the type locality given as "Northeastern, eastern and southeastern part of European Arctic Ocean, Kara Sea, to Bering Strait". The hamecon is classified by some authorities in the subgenus Artediellus.

== Etymology ==
The hamecon's specific name scaber means "rough" and is a reference to the nomerous small bumps on the skin of this fish.

== Description ==
The hamecon has the first spine on the preoperculum hooked upwards and has many fleshy cirrhi on its head and the front part of the lateral line. There are no nasal spines and the crown and forward part of the back are covered in small tubercles. There are between 7 and 9 spines and 12 to 14 soft rays in the dorsal fins and 10 to 13 soft rays in the anal fin. The caudal fin is rounded. The upper head is greyish-brown the upper body lis paler and is marked with large, irregular dark spots which line up to create cross-bands. There are orange stripes on all the fins and the tips of the pectoral fins are white. there is an oval black spot on the rear part of spiny (i.e. first) dorsal fin in males. This species has a maximum published total length of 8.9 cm (3.5 in).

== Distribution and habitat ==
The hamecon is found from the northeastern Atlantic Ocean through the southern Barents Sea east through the Kara Sea to the Bering Strait and Hudson Strait. This is a benthic species found over mud, sand, gravel and rocky substrates at depths between 10 and 290 m (33 and 951 ft).

== Biology ==
The hamecon will burrow into soft substrates. It feeds mainly on polychaetes and small crustaceans. These fishes spawn in late autumn, laying between 50 and 100 eggs. They are sexually mature at 3 or 4 years of age and a length of 5.6 cm (2.2 in). They may live for up to 7 years.
