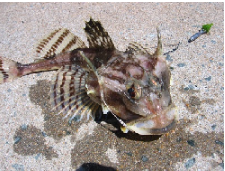

Scientific classification
- Kingdom: Animalia
- Phylum: Chordata
- Class: Actinopterygii
- Order: Perciformes
- Suborder: Cottoidei
- Family: Psychrolutidae
- Genus: Artediellus
- Species: A. atlanticus

Binomial name
- Artediellus atlanticus Jordan & Evermann, 1898

Synonyms
- Artediellus atlanticus atlanticus Jordan & Evermann, 1898; Artediellus europaeus Knipowitsch, 1907; Artediellus atlanticus europaeus Knipowitsch, 1907

= Artediellus atlanticus =

Species of fish

Artediellus atlanticus, the Atlantic hookear sculpin or hookhorn sculpin, is a species of marine ray-finned fish belonging to the family Cottidae. It is found along the coasts of Northern Atlantic Ocean.

== Taxonomy ==
Artediellus atlanticus was first formally described in 1898 by the American ichthyologists David Starr Jordan and Barton Warren Evermann with its type locality given as Massachusetts Bay. This species is classified in the genus Artediellus which is classified in the subfamily Cottinae of the family Cottidae in the 5th edition of Fishes of the World. This species is classified by some authorities in the subgenus Artediellus.

== Description ==
Artediellus atlanticus has an elongated body which is thicker at the front and tapers to the tail with a moderately large mouth. The gill membranes are joined at the isthmus, there are no bony protuberances on the scales of the lateral line and the spine on the operculum is hooked upwards. The dorsal fina are supported by a total of 7 spines and 13 soft rays while the anal fin is supported by 11 soft rays. The maximum published standard length is 15 cm (5.9 in), although 10.5 cm (4.1 in) is more typical.

== Distribution and habitat ==
Artediellus atlanticus in the North Atlantic Ocean where it occurs from Greenland to Cape Cod in the northwestern Atlantic and from the Barents Sea and Greenland south through Iceland, Scandinavia, the Faroes south to northern Scotland and Ireland. It is a demersal fish found on sandy or muddy substrates at depths between 35 and 900 m (115 and 2,953 ft).

== Biology ==
Artediellus atlanticus feeds on benthic inverterates such as polychaetes and small molluscs, they very infrequently prey on small crustaceans. It occurs at temperatures between −1.7 and 4 °C (28.9 and 39.2 °F). The females lay between 50 and 350 eggs in the late summer. The eggs take over 200 days to hatch and the larvae hatched from the eggs are well developed, very similar to adults.
