= Vyatka electoral district =

Legislative constituency of the Russian Republic

Vyatka
- Former Civilian constituency for the All-Russian Constituent Assembly
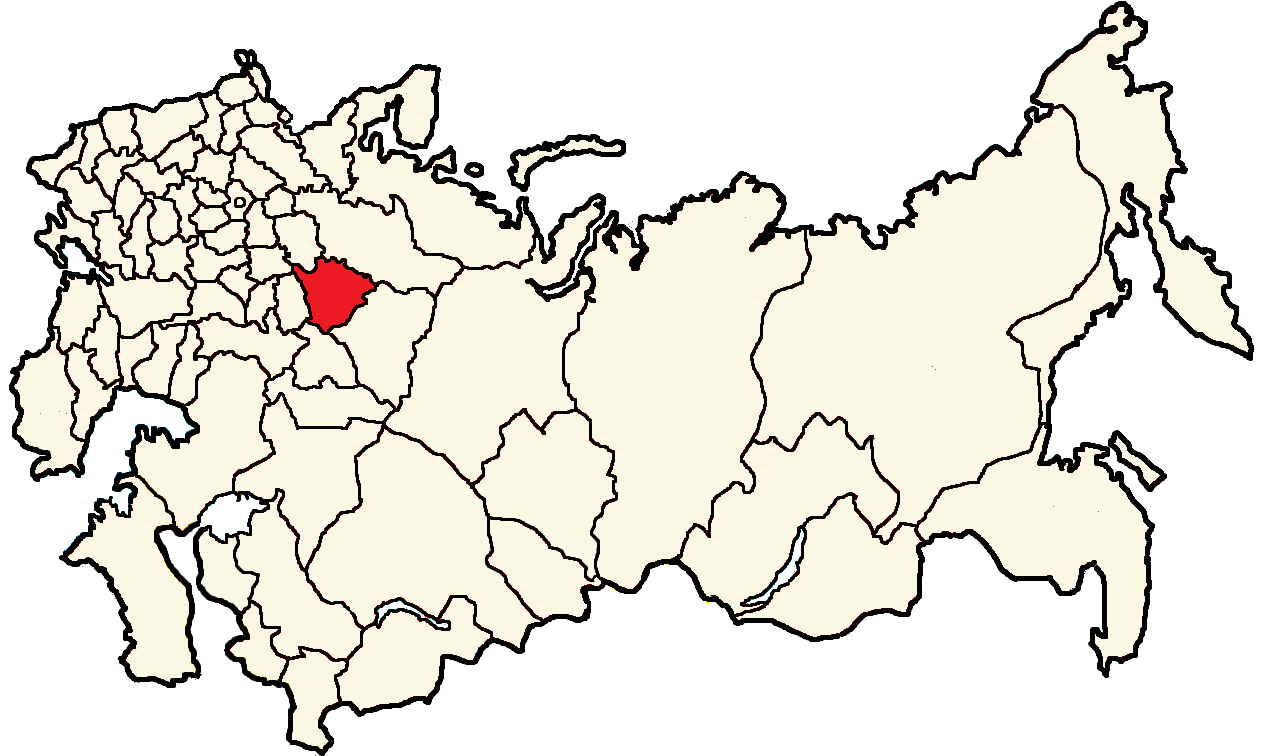

Former constituency
- Created: 1917
- Abolished: 1918
- Number of members: 16
- Number of Uyezd Electoral Commissions: 11
- Number of Urban Electoral Commissions: 1
- Number of Parishes: 324

The Vyatka electoral district (Russian: Вятский избирательный округ) was a constituency created for the 1917 Russian Constituent Assembly election.

The electoral district covered the Vyatka Governorate. 8 out of 20 submitted candidate lists were disqualified. Cheremis ran on a joint list with the Popular Socialists.

== Results ==
The account of American historian Oliver Henry Radkey (displayed in the table below) only includes full result for three lists (Bolsheviks, Mensheviks, Orthodox), albeit the number of votes for the Orthodox list has been rounded off. The real vote of the other nine lists, according to Radkey, would have been more than double what is accounted for.

Vyatka
Party	Vote	%
List 3 – Vyatka Governorate Congress of Peasants Deputies and the Party of Socialist-Revolutionaries	300,503	46.91
List 11 – Bolsheviks	222,272	34.70
List 4 – Muslim Union of Vyatka Governorate	37,781	5.90
List 5 – Popular Socialists and Cheremi National Union	25,311	3.95
List 9 – Kadets	22,404	3.50
List 6 – Mensheviks	18,964	2.96
List 10 – Orthodox Parish Democratic Union	9,000	1.40
List 2 – Vyatka Governorate Commercial and Industrial Union	3,424	0.53
List 12 – Glazovski Uezd Congress of Workers, Soldiers and Peasants Soviets (Left Socialist-Revolutionaries)	942	0.15
List 1 – Kotelnichesky Uezd Soviet of Peasant Deputies	?	
List 7 – Petropavlovsk Division of the Russian Peasant Union	?	
List 8 – Group of Citizens of Yaraisky and Pachinsky Volosts	?	
Total:	640,601	

Deputies Elected
Pastukhov	Bolshevik
Popov	Bolshevik
Shvetsov	Bolshevik
Sponde	Bolshevik
Biryukov	SR
Buzanov	SR
Efremov	SR
Evseev	SR
Golovizin	SR
Kropotov	SR
Kuznetsov	SR
Salamatov	SR
Shulakov	SR
Zbarsky	SR
Tchaikovsky	Popular Socialists-Cheremi National Union alliance
Vikhlyaev	SR

In Vyatka town, the Kadets was the most voted party, with 4,082 votes (29.8%). The Bolsheviks received 2,474 votes (18.2%), the Mensheviks 2,000 votes (14.6%), the SRs 1,682 votes (12.3%), the Popular Socialist-Cheremi list 1,635 votes (11.9%), the Commercial-Industrial list 952 votes (7.1%), the Orthodox list 675 votes (4.9%), the Muslim Union 100 votes (0.7%), the left-wing SRs 53 votes (0.3%) and 25 votes for the remaining lists. In the Vyatka garrison the Bolsheviks obtained 1,491 votes (68.7%), the SRs 441 votes (20.3%), the Kadets 87 votes (4%), the Mensheviks 50 votes (2.3%), the SR left 32 votes (1.5%), the Commercial-Industrial list 11 votes (0.5%), the Muslim Union 10 votes (0.4%) and 6 votes for the remaining lists.
