= Maria Klenova =

Russian and Soviet marine geologist

Maria Klenova (or Klyonova)
- Мари́я Васи́льевна Клёнова
- Born: 12 August 1898; Irkutsk, Russian Empire
- Died: 6 August 1976 (aged 77); Moscow, RSFSR, Soviet Union
- Known for: Seabed mapping
- Scientific career
- Fields: Marine geology
- Workplaces: Shirshov Institute of Oceanology; Academy of Sciences of the Soviet Union
- Doctoral advisor: Vladimir Vernadsky

Notes
- A founder of Russian marine science and the first to fully map the seabed of the Barents Sea.

Maria Vasilyevna Klenova (or Klyonova) (Russian: Мари́я Васи́льевна Клёнова; 12 August 1898 – 6 August 1976) was a Russian and Soviet marine geologist and one of the founders of Russian marine science and contributor to the first Soviet Antarctic atlas.

Klenova studied to become a professor and later on worked as a member of the Council for Antarctic Research of the Academy of Sciences of the Soviet Union. During that time she spent nearly thirty years researching in the Polar Regions and become the first woman scientist to do research in Antarctica. She joined in the First Soviet Antarctic Expedition (1955–57) and worked with ANARE (Australian National Antarctic Research Expeditions) at Macquarie Island.

== Early life ==
Maria Vasilyevna Klenova was born in Irkutsk in 1898. She was educated in Yekaterinburg and moved to Moscow during World War I to work in a hospital while undertaking medical studies. She travelled to Siberia to continue her medical studies during the Russian Civil War. In the early 1920s Klenova returned to Moscow and pursued a study of mineralogy. She graduated from Moscow State University in 1924. She undertook her doctoral degree under supervisors Yakov Samoilov and Vladimir Vernadsky.

== Career ==
Klenova began her marine geology career in 1925 as a researcher aboard the Soviet research vessel Perseus, attached to the Floating Marine Research Institute (precursor to the present-day Nikolai M. Knipovich Polar Research Institute of Marine Fisheries and Oceanography) established by Ivan Mesyatsev in the Barents Sea and the archipelagos of Novaya Zemlya, Spitsbergen, and Franz Josef Land. In 1933 Klenova produced the first complete seabed map of the Barents Sea. She identified and named the Barents abyssal plain (85ºN, 40ºE) after the Dutch polar explorer Willem Barentsz (or Barents) who died in 1597 on his third expedition to find the Northeast Passage.

In 1949 Klenova became a senior research associate at the Shirshov Institute of Oceanology of the Academy of Sciences of the Soviet Union. Her work included analyses of seabed geology in the Atlantic Ocean and the Antarctic, and in the Caspian, Barents and White Seas. In the austral summer of 1956 she traveled with a Soviet oceanographic team to map uncharted areas of the Antarctic coast.

== Contributions ==
Her contributions helped to create the first Antarctic atlas, a groundbreaking four-volume work published in the Soviet Union. Klenova spent most of her time making observations on board the Russian icebreakers Ob and Lena. Her group took oceanographic measurements in Antarctic and sub-Antarctic waters. Along with Klenova there were seven other women on board the Ob. At that time women were rarely allowed to venture on land and had to rely on their male colleagues to collect and bring back data samples. In between these two voyages she worked at Mirny, a Russian base on the Queen Mary Coast (which is shared by Australian and Polish Research Stations). On the way home Klenova went to Macquarie Island where she became the first female scientist ever to go ashore.

Her book Geologiya Moray (Geology of the sea) published in 1948 was the second textbook dedicated to marine geology.

== Honours ==
The Klenova Valley (84°36′N 55°00′W), an oceanographic valley discovered in 1981–1983 by the USSR Northern Fleet Hydrographic Expedition is named after her. Klenova Seamount, about 450 km east of Salvador, Brazil (13º01.5' S, 34º15' W), Klenova crater on Venus and Klenova Peak in Antarctica are also named in her honour.

== See also ==
- Timeline of women in science
