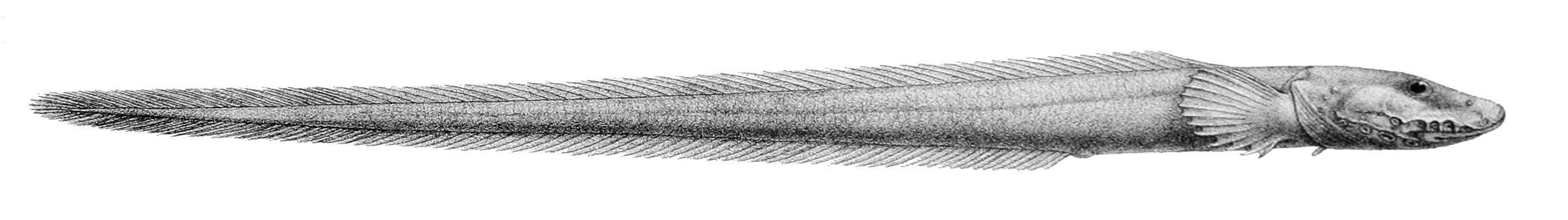

Scientific classification
- Kingdom: Animalia
- Phylum: Chordata
- Class: Actinopterygii
- Order: Perciformes
- Family: Zoarcidae
- Genus: Lycenchelys
- Species: L. muraena

Binomial name
- Lycenchelys muraena (Collett, 1878

Synonyms
- Lycodes muraena Collett, 1878)

= Lycenchelys muraena =

Species of fish

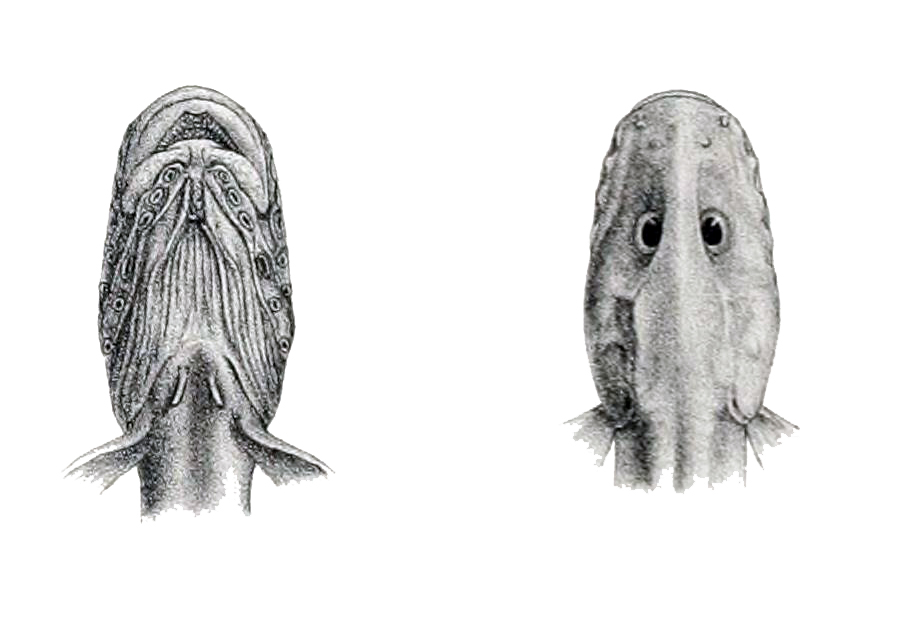

Lycenchelys muraena, the moray wolf eel, is a species of marine ray-finned fish belonging to the family Zoarcidae, the eelpouts. It is found in the Arctic and North Atlantic Oceans.

== Taxonomy ==
Lycenchelys muraena was first formally described as Lycodes muraena by the Norwegian zoologist Robert Collett in 1878 with its type locality given as 325 km (202 mi) west-southwest of Bodø in Norway, at a depth of 640 m (2,100 ft). In 1920 David Starr Jordan designated this Lycodes muraena as the type species of the genus Lycenchelys, which had been proposed by Theodore Gill in 1884 but which Gill had not given a type species for. The specific name is the Scientific name for moray eel and is a reference to the slender, eel-shaped body of this species.

== Description ==
Lycenchelys muraena has a very elongate body which has a depth at the origin of the anal fin which is around 1/20th of its total length. The body is covered in scales apart from the forward are of chest and on the back in front of the dorsal fin. The origin of the dorsal fin origin is over the centre of the pectoral fin, the pectoral fin has a length equivalent to 8% of the total length while the distance from the snout to the anus is around 26% t 30% of the total length. There is a double lateral line, with a frequently indistinct midlateral line and they branch ventrally. The colour is a uniform dark brownish. The maximum published standard length for this species is 22.6 cm (8.9 in).

== Distribution, habitat and biology ==
Lycenchelys muraena is found in the Arctic and North Atlantic Oceans where it has been recorded northwest and east of Greenland, in the Norwegian Sea and in the Kara Sea, south as far as the Faroe Islands It is a bathydemersal species found at depths between 350 and 1,700 m (1,150 and 5,580 ft) over mud substrates, often at water temperatures below 0 °C (32 °F). It feeds on small crustaceans.
