= Ivan Mesyatsev =

Russian and Soviet oceanographer and marine biologist (1885–1940)

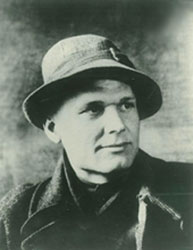

Ivan Illarionovich Mesyatsev (20 June 1885 – 7 May 1940) was a Russian and Soviet zoologist who specialized in oceanographic research. He was responsible for the first definitions of fish schools in ichthyology. An undersea mountain in the Atlantic, a Cape on Eva-Liv Island, and a mountain in Antarctica are named after Mesyatsev.

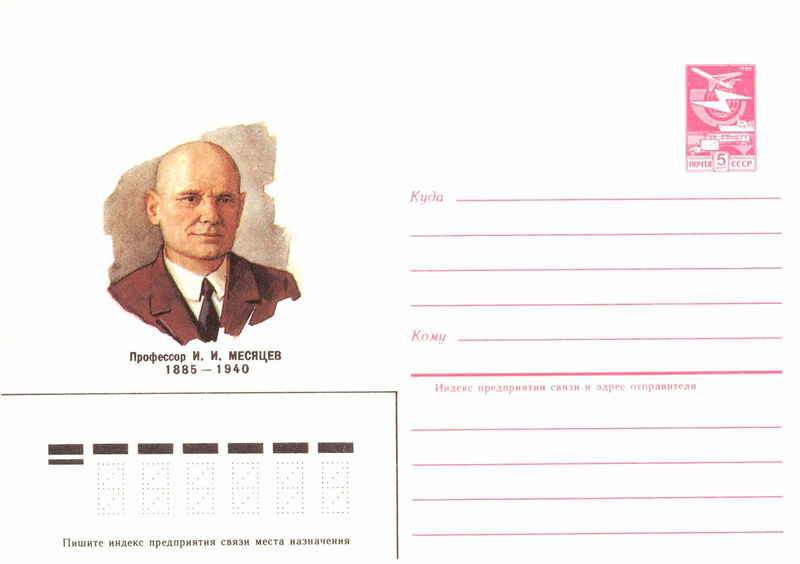
A Soviet postcard commemorating Mesyatsev

Mesyatsev was born in what is now Krasnodar Krai and studied at the Vladikavkaz gymnasium and St Petersburg Institute of Technology before going to Moscow University where he graduated in 1912. He worked on embryology and histology but an interest in marine fishes was sparked after a visit to the marine biological stations in France in 1910. He taught at Moscow University for a while and in 1920 he worked as part of a scientific fisheries expedition into the Barents Sea. An active member of the communist party, he received support from V.I. Lenin for his work. In 1921 he helped establish a floating marine laboratory (Plavmornin) and helped set up the wooden research vessel Perseus which was used for numerous expeditions. A firm believer in equal rights, he encouraged women oceanographers and the Perseus mission had nearly thirteen women on expeditions including Maria Klenova. In 1929 he headed the State Oceanographic Institute which later became the VNIRO (The Russian oceanographic research institute) and in 1934 he headed the commission to examine the fish resources of the Caspian Sea.
