= Lycenchelys alba =

Conservation status
- Data Deficient (IUCN 3.1)

Scientific classification
- Kingdom: Animalia
- Phylum: Chordata
- Class: Actinopterygii
- Order: Perciformes
- Family: Zoarcidae
- Genus: Lycenchelys
- Species: L. alba

Binomial name
- Lycenchelys alba (Vaillant, 1888)

Synonyms
- Lycenchelys labradorensis Geistdorfer, Hureau & Rannou, 1970; Lycodes albus Vaillant, 1888

Species of fish

Lycenchelys alba is a species of marine ray-finned fish belonging to the family Zoarcidae, the eelpouts.

== Description ==
Lycenchelys alba is up to 26.7 cm (10.5 in) in length. Its head pores are large and oval.

== Habitat ==
Lycenchelys alba is benthic, living at depths of up to 3,975 m (13,041 ft) in the northeast Atlantic Ocean, between Rockall and the Azores.
