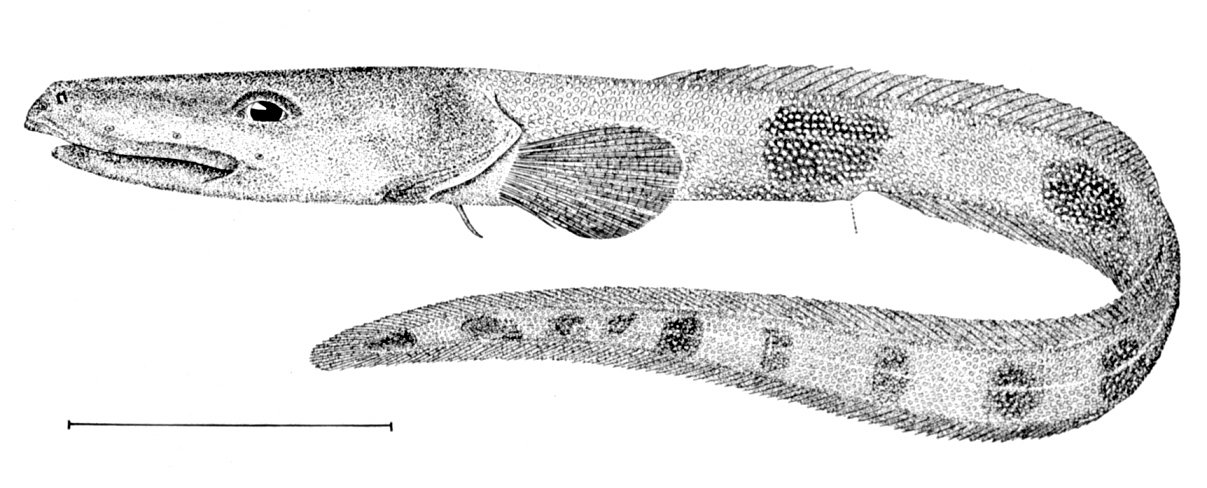
- Lycenchelys verrillii

Scientific classification
- Kingdom: Animalia
- Phylum: Chordata
- Class: Actinopterygii
- Order: Perciformes
- Family: Zoarcidae
- Subfamily: Lycodinae
- Genus: Lycenchelys; Gill, 1884

Type species
- Lycodes muraena Collett, 1878

Synonyms
- Apodolycus Andriyashev, 1979; Embryx Jordan & Evermann, 1898; Furcella Jordan £ Evermann, 1896; Lyciscus Jordan & Gilbert, 1899; Lycodophis Vaillant, 1888

= Lycenchelys =

Genus of fishes

Lycenchelys is a genus of marine ray-finned fishes belonging to the family Zoarcidae, the eelpouts. The genus has almost cosmopolitan distribution.

== Taxonomy ==
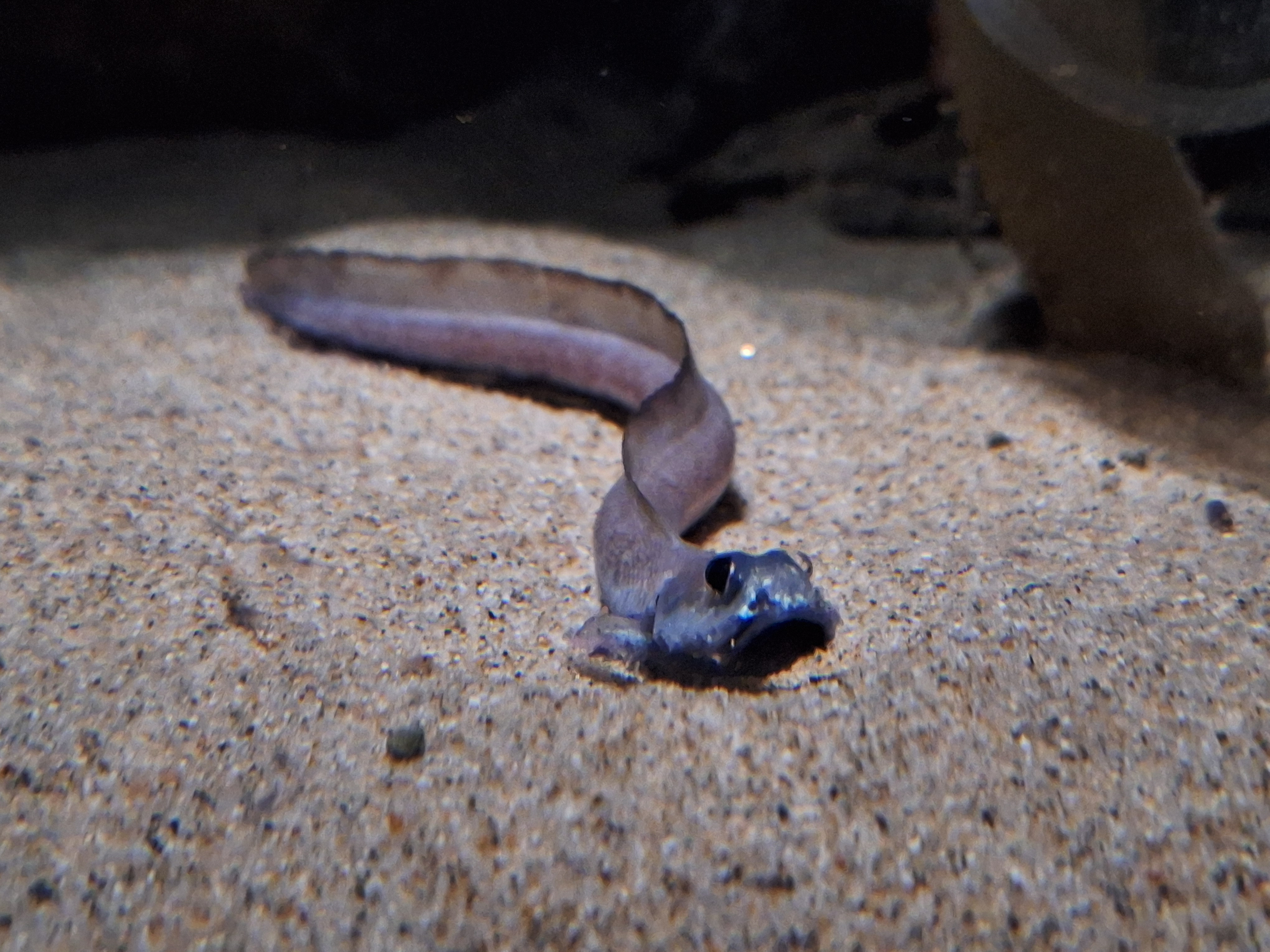
Snakehead eelpout

Lycenelchys was first proposed as a genus in 1884 by the American ichthyologist Theodore Gill with Lycodes muraena being designated as the type species in 1920 by David Starr Jordan, this species was originally described by the Norwegian zoologist Robert Collett in 1878 with its type locality given as 325 km (202 mi) west-southwest of Bodø in Norway, at a depth of 640 m (2,100 ft). The genus is classified in the subfamily Lycodinae, one of four subfamilies in the family Zoarcidae, the eelpouts.

== Species ==
Lycenchelys contains the following species:

- Lycenchelys alba (Vaillant, 1888)
- Lycenchelys albeola Andriashev, 1958
- Lycenchelys albomaculata Toyoshima, 1983
- Lycenchelys alta Toyoshima, 1985
- Lycenchelys antarctica Regan, 1913
- Lycenchelys aratrirostris Andriashev & Permitin, 1968
- Lycenchelys argentina Marschoff, Torno & Tomo, 1977
- Lycenchelys aurantiaca Shinohara & Matsuura, 1998
- Lycenchelys bachmanni Gosztonyi, 1977
- Lycenchelys bellingshauseni Andriashev & Permitin, 1968
- Lycenchelys bullisi Cohen, 1964
- Lycenchelys callista M. E. Anderson, 1995
- Lycenchelys camchatica (Gilbert & Burke, 1912)
- Lycenchelys chauliodus M. E, Anderson, 1995
- Lycenchelys cicatrifer (Garman, 1899)
- Lycenchelys crotalinus (Gilbert, 1890)
- Lycenchelys fedorovi M.., Anderson & Balanov, 2000
- Lycenchelys folletti M. E. Andersonn, 1995
- Lycenchelys hadrogeneia M. E. Anderson, 1995
- Lycenchelys hippopotamus Schmidt, 1950
- Lycenchelys hureaui (Andriashev, 1979)
- Lycenchelys imamurai M.E. Anderson, 2006
- Lycenchelys incisa (Garman, 1899)
- Lycenchelys jordani (Evermann & Goldsborough, 1907)
- Lycenchelys kolthoffi Jensen, 1904
- Lycenchelys lonchoura M. E. Anderson, 1995
- Lycenchelys maculata Toyoshima, 1985
- Lycenchelys makushok Fedorov & Andriashev, 1993
- Lycenchelys maoriensis Andriashev & Fedorov, 1986
- Lycenchelys melanostomias Toyoshima, 1983
- Lycenchelys micropora Andriashev, 1955
- Lycenchelys monstrosa Anderson, 1982
- Lycenchelys muraena (Collett, 1878)
- Lycenchelys nanospinata M. E. Anderson, 1988
- Lycenchelys nigripalatum DeWitt & Hureau, 1979
- Lycenchelys novaezealandiae Anderson & Møller, 2007
- Lycenchelys parini Fedorov, 1995
- Lycenchelys paxillus (Goode & T. H. Bean, 1879)
- Lycenchelys pearcyi M. E. Anderson, 1995
- Lycenchelys pentactina M. E. Anderson, 1995
- Lycenchelys pequenoi M. E. Anderson, 1995
- Lycenchelys peruana M. E. Anderson, 1995
- Lycenchelys platyrhina (Jensen, 1902)
- Lycenchelys plicifera Andriashev, 1955
- Lycenchelys polyodon M. E. Anderson & Møller, 2007
- Lycenchelys porifer (Gilbert, 1890)
- Lycenchelys rassi Andriashev, 1955
- Lycenchelys ratmanovi Andriashev, 1955
- Lycenchelys remissaria Fedorov, 1995
- Lycenchelys rosea Toyoshima, 1985
- Lycenchelys ryukyuensis Shinohara & M. E. Anderson, 2007
- Lycenchelys sarsii (Collett, 1871)
- Lycenchelys scaurus (Garman, 1899)
- Lycenchelys squamosa Toyoshima, 1983
- Lycenchelys tohokuensis Anderson & Imamura, 2002
- Lycenchelys tristichodon DeWitt & Hureau, 1979
- Lycenchelys uschakovi Andriashev, 1958
- Lycenchelys verrillii (Goode & T. H. Bean, 1877)
- Lycenchelys vitiazi Andriashev, 1955
- Lycenchelys volki Andriashev, 1955
- Lycenchelys wilkesi M. E. Anderson, 1988
- Lycenchelys xanthoptera M. E. Anderson, 1991

== Etymology ==
Lycenchelys is a combination of lyc, a reference to the genus Lycodes and enchelys, the Greek word for "eel". i.e. similar to Lycodes but with a more elongated eel-like shape.

== Characteristics ==
Lycenelchys are regarded as derived Lycodine eelpouts which are separated from other Lycodine genera by a number of oseological characters. They can be diagnosed by having between 6 and 10 suborbital bones and a cephalic sensory canal with between 6 and 10 pores. The pterygiophore of the first dorsal fin ray is associated with the second to the 21st vertebrae and there can be up to 16 free pterygiophores, or there may be none. There is a weak series of palatopterygoids, a weak oral valve and pseudobranch. They may or may not have pelvic fins, vomerine teeth and palatine teeth. Scales, the pyloric caeca and lateral line or lines are all present. The species with the greatest published length is Lycenchelys albomaculata, with a standard length of 43.8 cm (17.2 in), while the lowest published length is that of Lycenchelys peruana with a maximum total length of 10.5 cm (4.1 in).

== Distribution and habitat ==
Lycenchelys is a cosmopolitan genus with species in all oceans, they are found in continental slope and abyssal habitats. They are rare or absent from the far northern Arctic, the eastern Atlantic and the tropical Indian Oceans.
