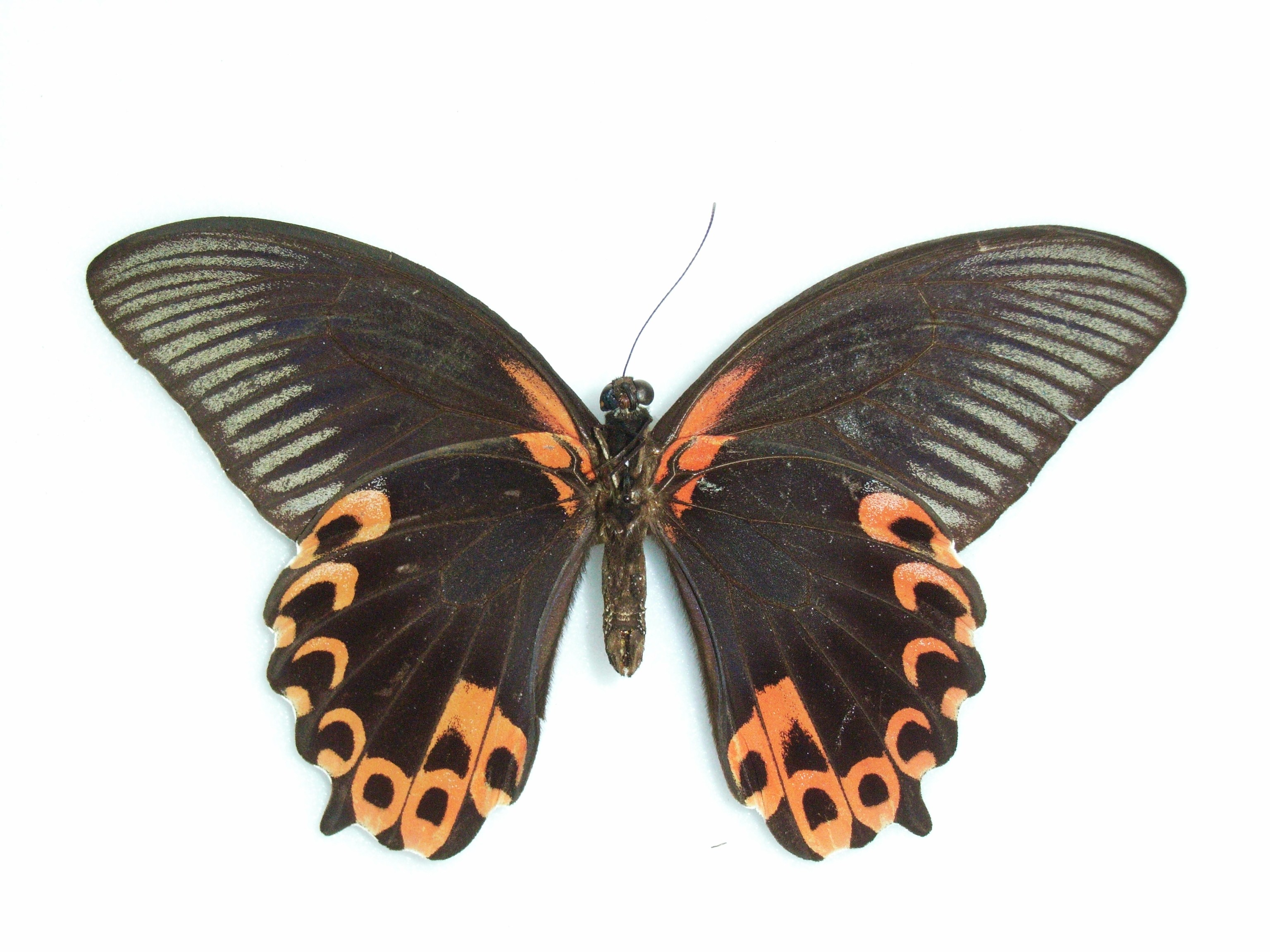

Scientific classification
- Kingdom: Animalia
- Phylum: Arthropoda
- Clade: Pancrustacea
- Class: Insecta
- Order: Lepidoptera
- Family: Papilionidae
- Genus: Papilio
- Species: P. deiphobus

Binomial name
- Papilio deiphobus Linnaeus, 1758

Synonyms
- Papilio alcandor Cramer, [1776]; Papilio aristartus Fruhstorfer, 1916; Papilio efbensis Talbot, 1932; Menelaides deiphobus; Papilio deiphontes C. & R. Felder, 1864; Papilio deipylus C. & R. Felder, 1864

= Papilio deiphobus =

Species of butterfly

Papilio deiphobus is a species of swallowtail butterfly in the Papilioninae subfamily. It is found from the Mollucas to Sulawesi in Indonesia.

The wingspan is 130–160 millimetres (5.1–6.3 in).P. deiphobus. Very nearly allied to the preceding species [Papilio rumanzovia]. Forewing much less falcate. With or without tail, the patches of the under surface as brilliant red as in rumanzovia.Male upper surface of the hindwing before the distal margin with a broad band composed of light blue stripes, the inner margin of which is uniformly concave.Female: forewing with thin white fringe-spots; the red admarginal spots of the hindwing, and especially the anterior ones, broadly confluent with the white fringe-spots. This quick-flying butterfly is especially common near the settlements, where Citrus trees grow in the gardens, rarer in the woods. The larva still undescribed [then] , probably similar to that of memnon. The Moluccas and Waigeu, perhaps also in New Guinea. — deiphontes Fldr. (29 a). Tailless, but with distinctly projecting tooth at the 3. radial. the blue stripes on the upper surface of the hindwing densely scaled, more or less united in pairs and the patches thus formed distally emarginate. Female: forewing from the base to the 2. median brownish black, then lighter, with brownish black streaks between the veins, on the under surface only the light streaks placed behind the 2. median basally white, the others all darkened. Hindwing always with white discal area and anteriorly near the apex with metallically blue scaling.Males and females which have yellowish instead of red spots on the hindwing are ab. flava Oberth. Morty, Halmaheira, Ternate and Batjan. —deipylus Fldr. Male tailed, the band of the hindwing as in deiphontes, but the black interneural stripes on the whole even thinner. The female likewise tailed, the forewing darker than in deiphontes, the posterior grey-brown stripes not whitish basally, the white cell-spot of the hindwing only indicated. Waigeu and perhaps also Dutch New Guinea. — deiphobus L. (female = alcandor Cr.) (28 a, b). Tailed. Male: the grey-blue stripes on the upperside of the hindwing much further from the distal margin than in the preceding forms and mostly also much thinner.Female: the part of the disc of the forewing placed below the cell and also the adjoining part of the cell itself much lighter; the markings of the hindwing individually variable. Specimens (males and females) in which all the red is replaced by yellow are ab. hypoxanthos Rob. On Ceram, Saparoea, Amboina, Buru and Obi: common.

The larvae feed on Citrus species.

== Subspecies ==
- Papilio deiphobus deiphobus (Ceram, Ambon, Buru, Obi)
- Papilio deiphobus deiphontes C. & R. Felder, 1864 (Sumatra, Morotai, Ternate, Halmahera, Bachan)
- Papilio deiphobus deipylus C. & R. Felder, 1864 (Weigeu)
- Papilio deiphobus tarawakana Page & Treadaway, 1993 (Tawitawi)

Now considered a separate species:

- Papilio rumanzovia Eschscholtz, 1821 – scarlet Mormon (formerly Papilio deiphobus rumanzovia)
