= Vasily Shuleikin =

Vasily Vladimirovich Shuleikin
- Born: January 1, 1895; Moscow, Russian Empire
- Died: April 25, 1979 (aged 84); Moscow, Soviet Union
- Education: Bauman Moscow State Technical University
- Awards: Order of Lenin; Stalin Prize; Order of the October Revolution; Order of the Red Banner of Labour; Medal "In Commemoration of the 800th Anniversary of Moscow"; Medal "For Valiant Labour in the Great Patriotic War 1941–1945"; Order of the Red Star
- Scientific career
- Fields: Physics
- Workplaces: Moscow State University
- Academic advisors: Nikolay Yegorovich Zhukovsky

Vasily Vladimirovich Shuleikin (Russian: Василий Владимирович Шуле́йкин, 1 January 1895 – 25 April 1979) was a Soviet scientist, mathematician and engineer. He made significant contributions to understanding of nonlinear wave phenomena, ocean acoustics and marine physics. His work on sea ice flows is considered foundational.

== Life ==
Born 1 January 1895 into the family of Vladimir Vasilievich Shuleikin the technical director of a small chemical-dyeing factory, Vasily Vladimirovich Shuleikin graduated from the Moscow Lutheran Reformer School founded by Ivan Fidler in 1912. He went on to Bauman Moscow State Technical University where he studied mathematics, graduating in 1917. His first published research work dealt with rectifiers (November, 1916).

After graduation he remained at Bauman and started teaching there in 1918. He taught mathematical analysis, analytic geometry, and latter electromagnetism. He acquired a research interest in marine physics in 1921 and remained faithful to this topic for the rest of this life. He gained the formal rank of professor in 1923. From 1927 to 1929 he was a professor at the Physics Department of the Yaroslavl Pedagogical Institute. Following Russian custom, he held multiple overlapping positions over the proceeding years including the Institute of Physics and Biophysics (1920–1931) and the Marine Scientific Institute (1922). From 1926 to 1929 he worked in the physical laboratory of the camouflage department of the Moscow engineering test site. While working on military research, he was enlisted as an officer in the Soviet Navy. Between 1945 and 1947 he held the additional position as head department in the Naval Academy of Shipbuilding and Armament.

In 1928, he moved to Moscow State University, where in 1943 and he became head of the marine physics department. He participated in establishing the geophysics section of the Physics Department.

He was one of the founders (1929) of the Moscow Hydrometeorological Institute (today known as the Russian State Hydrometeorological University) and established the Black Sea Hydrophysical Station in Katsiveli, Crimea. Other positions he held include: Director of the Marine Hydrophysical Institute of the USSR Academy of Sciences of the USSR since 1942. In 1942–1945 he served in the Hydrographic Administration of the Navy.

He served as director of Roshydromet (Russian equivalent of National Oceanic and Atmospheric Administration) 1947–1950.

From the time he was 27 until 74 years, he conducted expeditionary research work: the hydrographic vessel Pakhtusov in the Kara Sea, many expeditions of the Marine Scientific Institute, the Hydrographic Department of the Meteorological Service, the Hydrometeorological Service – as a senior specialist, assistant chief and chief of the expedition, both in the polar seas and in the Black Sea; steamer "Transbalt" on a flight from Evpatoria to Vladivostok; expedition vessel "Sedov" in the Atlantic Ocean.

He was also an established composer, with works performed for broadcasting on the national radio.

He died on April 25, 1979. He is buried at the Novodevichy Cemetery in Moscow.

== Recognition ==
Corresponding Member of the USSR Academy of Sciences from 1929 onwards, and an academician from 1946.

== See also ==
- Perseus (Soviet ship)
