= Wihomarc =

Breton chief

Wihomarc or Wiomarc'h (French: Guyomard; died 825) was a Breton chieftain "who seemed to have greater authority than the other Breton leaders" and who revolted against Frankish overlordship in 822 and held on to his power until his death. His rebellion may have been incited by the creation of a Frankish county in Poutrocoet sometime between 818 and 820.

His was the first rebellion in Brittany since Louis the Pious pacified the region after the failed rebellion and death of Morman in 818. In the fall of 822, Lambert I of Nantes led the other counts of the Breton march against Wihomarc, but the resistance put up prevented him from being captured or killed. When the insurrection flared up again in 824, Louis himself led the armies of the Franks, which had assembled at Rennes in September. This suggests that the locus of Wihomarc's power was in the north of Brittany (west of Domnonée) and not in the south and west like Morman's.

The imperial army divided into three battles, one led by Louis and two under the command of his sons Pepin and Louis. For six weeks the Franks ravaged Brittany, but again Wihomarc did not give up and the army returned to Rouen in November. According to Regino of Prüm, whose chronology is horribly inaccurate, Louis was defeated by the Bretons in 836, but it is the campaign of 824 which he probably has in mind. Both the Vita Hludowici and the Royal Frankish Annals mention the breadth and depth of the devastation of the imperial army, but ignore the ultimate success or lack thereof of the campaign; this probably indicates it was a setback.

In May 825, Wihomarc led the other Breton leaders to Aachen to make peace with Louis, who pardoned them, granted them gifts, and made other concessions to them on the receiving of vows of loyalty. On his return, he was killed in his home by Lambert of Nantes for making peace with the Vikings.

As the subsequent viscounts of Léon used the name Wihomarc (Guiomar) in their family, it has been hypothesised that they descended from him.

== Sources ==
- Smith, Julia M. H. Province and Empire: Brittany and the Carolingians. Cambridge University Press, 1992.
