= Supreme Administration of the Northern Region =

Russian Civil War

Supreme Administration of the Northern Region Верховное управление Северной области
- 1918
- Flag

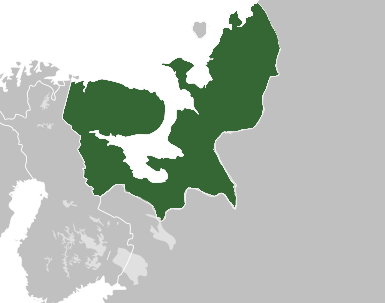
- The Supreme Administration of the Northern Region in August 1918.
- Status: Administration
- Capital: Arkhangelsk
- Common languages: Russian
- Chairman
  - 2 August to 6 September: Nikolai Tchaikovsky
  - 8 September to 28 September: Nikolai Tchaikovsky
- Historical era: World War I Russian Civil War
  - Established: 2 August 1918
  - The Supreme Administration of the Northern Region became the Provisional Government of the Northern Region: 28 September 1918
Preceded by
Russian Socialist Federative Soviet Republic
Murmansk Krai
Committee of Members of the Constituent Assembly
North Russia Intervention
Succeeded by
North Russia Intervention
Provisional Government of the Northern Region

The Supreme Administration of the Northern Region (VUSO; Severnaya Oblast; Russian: Верховное управление Северной области) was an anti-Bolshevik left-wing Allied government part of the White movement during the Russian Civil War.

== History ==
On 2 August 1918, the Supreme Administration of the Northern Region was declared in a coup by White Russians, led by Captain Georgi Chaplin, on the eve of the Western invasion of Arkhangelsk. British diplomats had traveled to Arkhangelsk in preparation of the invasion, and Major-general Frederick Poole had coordinated the coup with Chaplin. Allied warships sailed into the port from the White Sea. General Poole ran Archangelsk as Commander of British troops in Northern Russia, declaring martial law and banning the red flag, despite the decision of the Supreme Administration of the Northern Region to fly it.

On 6 August 1918, the Murmansk Krai Soviet authorized Chairman Yuryev to agree on the inclusion of Murmansk Krai into the Supreme Administration of the Northern Region. On 6 September 1918, Chairman Nikolai Tchaikovsky was ousted by the White Russian military in Arkhangelsk and incarcerated in a monastery on the nearby Solovetsky Islands. (He was later freed that same month.) On 15 September 1918, the Supreme Administration of the Northern Region issued a resolution which accepted Murmansk Krai as a part of the Supreme Administration of the Northern Region. On 28 September 1918, the Supreme Administration of the Northern Region became the Provisional Government of the Northern Region.

== Chairman of the Supreme Administration of Northern Region (Severnaya Oblast) ==
Popular Socialists

Portrait	Name (Birth–Death)	Term of office		Political party
	Nikolai Tchaikovsky (1851–1926)	2 August 1918	6 September 1918	Popular Socialists
	Nikolai Tchaikovsky (1851–1926)	8 September 1918	28 September 1918	Popular Socialists

== Territorial control ==
During its height of control, the Supreme Administration of the Northern Region controlled the overwhelming majority of the Arkhangelsk Governorate (using the 1917 governorate borders of the Russian Republic), about half of the Olonets Governorate (using the 1917 governorate borders of the Russian Republic), and a tiny part of the Vologda Governorate (using the 1917 governorate borders of the Russian Republic).
