= Nikolai M. Knipovich Polar Research Institute of Marine Fisheries and Oceanography =

Russian research institute

The Nikolai M. Knipovich Polar Research Institute of Marine Fisheries and Oceanography (Russian: Полярный научно-исследовательский институт морского рыбного хозяйства и океанографии имени Н. М. Книповича), its acronym being PINRO (Russian: ПИНРО), is one of several research institutes of Russia subordinate to the Russian Federal Agency for Fisheries (Rosrybolovstvo). It is based in Murmansk. It is named for Nikolai Knipovich.

== History ==
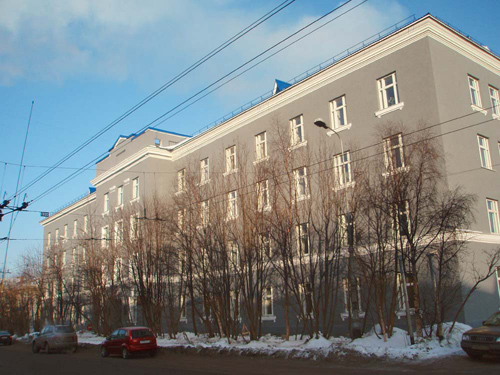
PINRO building in Murmansk

The institute was created on March 10, 1921 as the Floating Marine Research Institute (Plavmornin). It was preceded (though not directly) by the Imperial Russian organization Murman Scientific Fisheries Expedition, which existed in the late 19th and early 20th centuries and conducted early research with the vessel Saint Andrew. Between 1929 and 1933, the Institute was named State Oceanographic Institute of the USSR (SOI). Since 1935, it has borne the name of fisheries science pioneer Nikolai Knipovich.

During the German invasion of the Soviet Union in World War II (called, in Russia, the Great Patriotic War) the Institute was evacuated to Arkhangelsk. The Institute's main expedition ship Perseus, which had been with the Institute since its early days and undertaken close to 100 expeditions, was sunk by German air raiders in the early days of the war. The Perseus's flag, showing a stylized representation of the Perseus constellation, remains the Institute's symbol to this day.

== Activities ==
The main task of the team of scientists of the institute is conducting annual studies to help determine the total allowable catch of commercial fish species, invertebrates, algae and marine mammals. The main focus is on cod, haddock, capelin, herring, Greenland halibut, the Barents Sea population of the Kamchatka crab, and salmon. The Institute's area of responsibility includes the northern waters near European Russia – the Barents Sea, the Kara Sea, the White Sea, the Norwegian Sea, the Greenland Sea and the Northwest Atlantic Ocean – as well as freshwater lakes in the Murmansk and Arkhangelsk Regions, the Komi Republic, and the Nenets Autonomous District.
