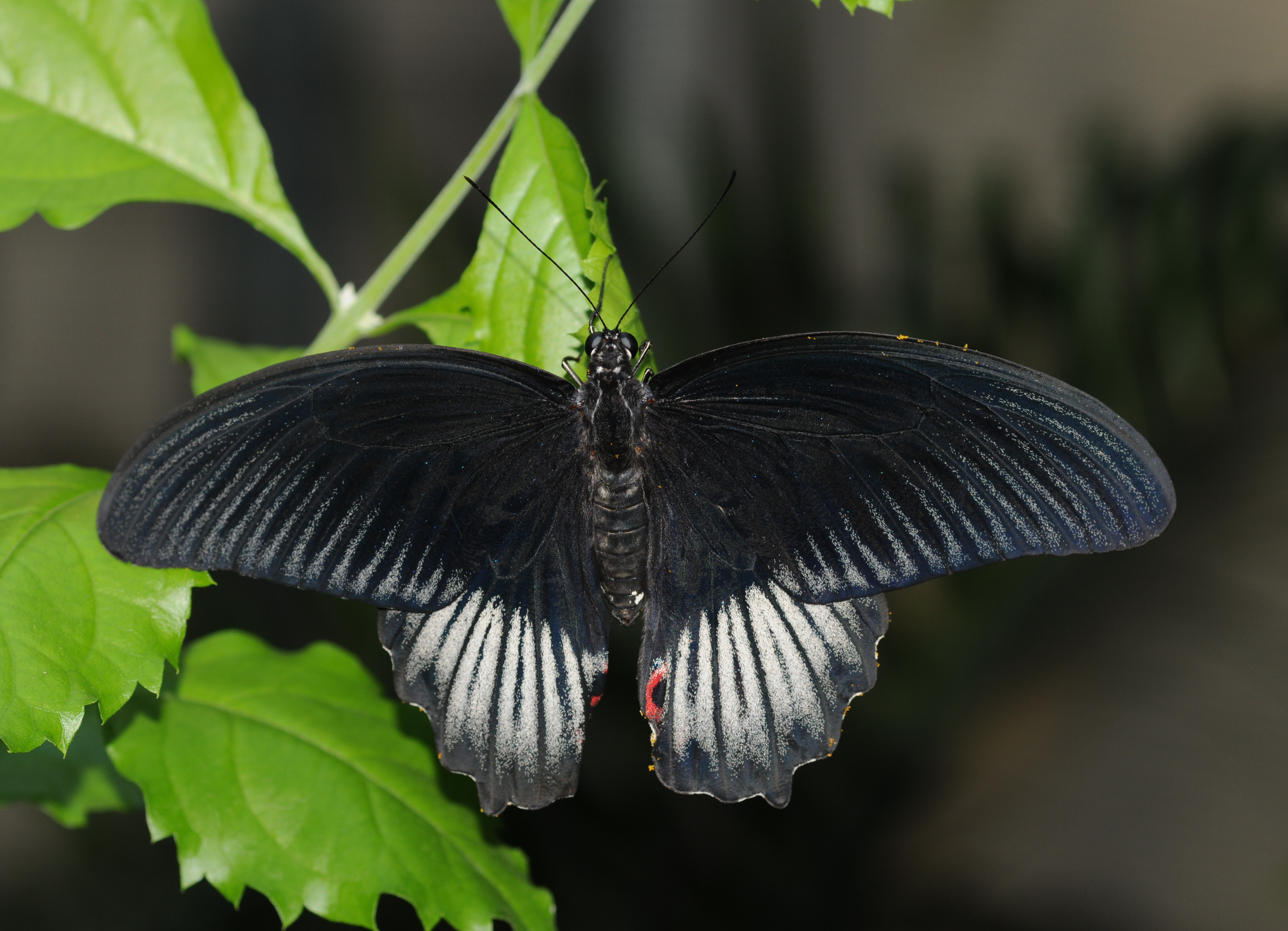
- Male
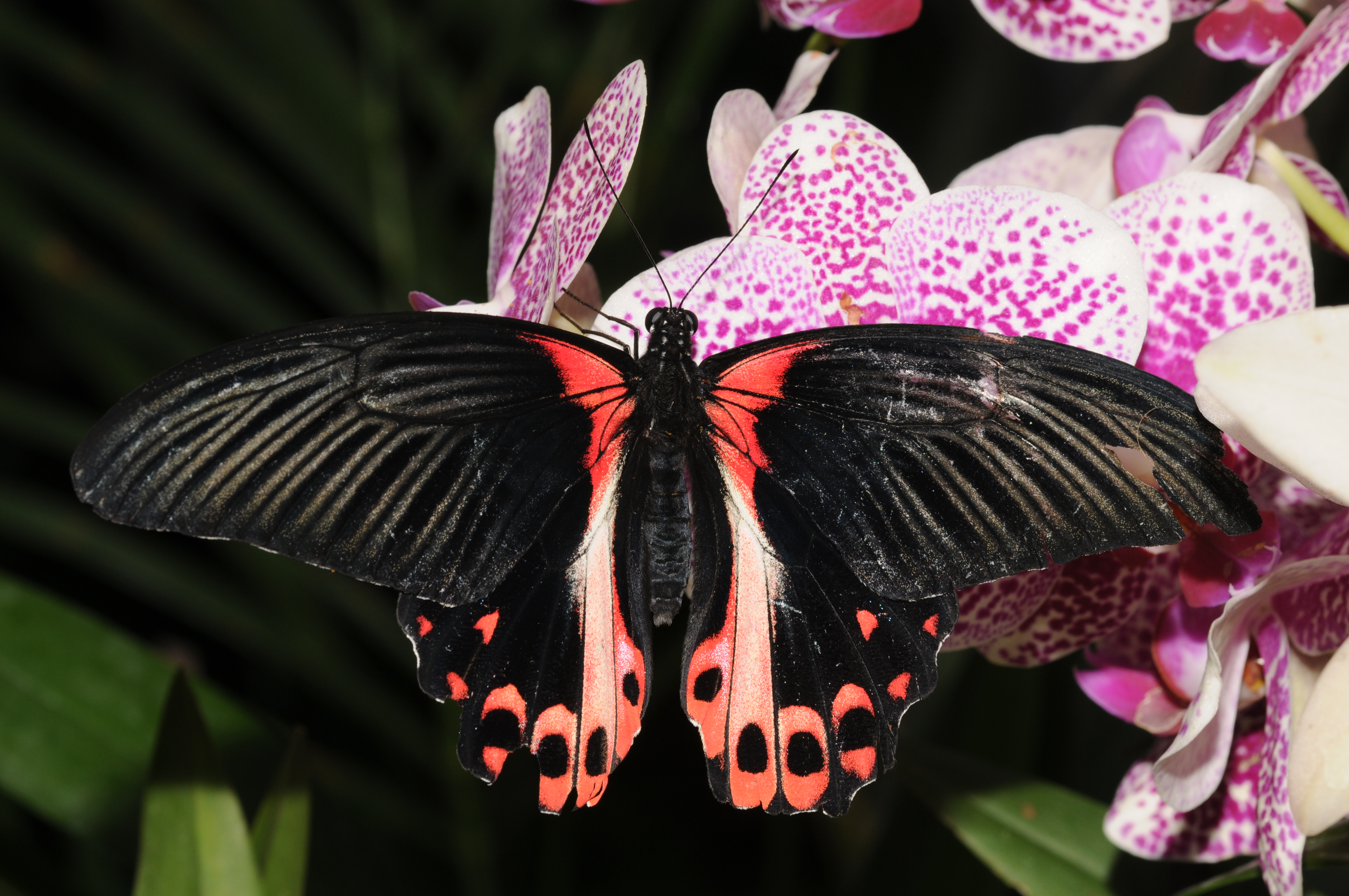
- Female

Scientific classification
- Kingdom: Animalia
- Phylum: Arthropoda
- Clade: Pancrustacea
- Class: Insecta
- Order: Lepidoptera
- Family: Papilionidae
- Genus: Papilio
- Species: P. rumanzovia

Binomial name
- Papilio rumanzovia Eschscholtz, 1821

Synonyms
- Papilio deiphobus rumanzovia; Papilio krusensternia Eschscholtz, 1821; Iliades emalthion Hübner, [1821]; Papilio descombii Roger, 1826; Papilio emalthion var. semperinus Haase, 1893

= Papilio rumanzovia =

Scarlet Mormon

Species of butterfly

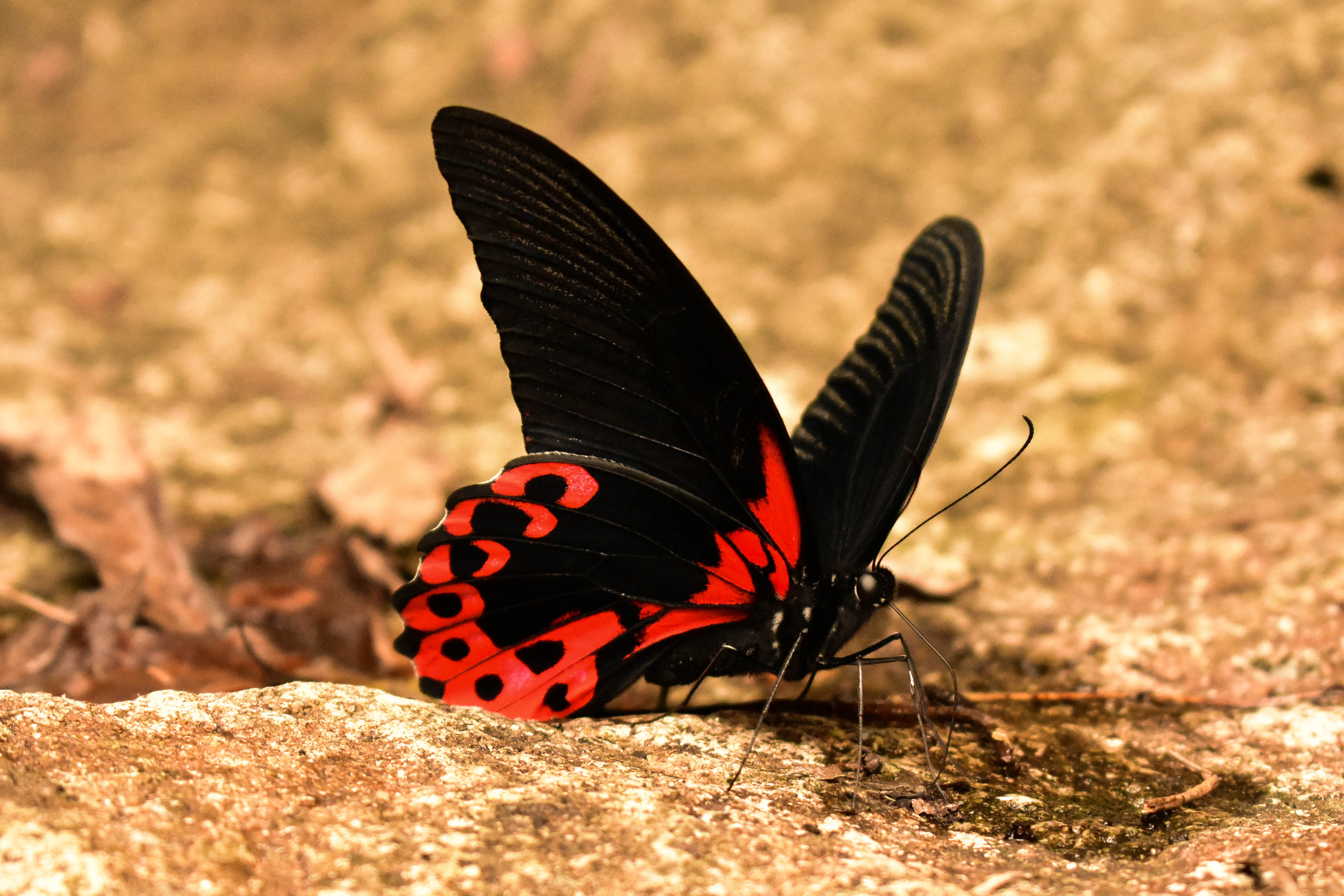
male, Mud-puddling

Papilio rumanzovia, the scarlet Mormon or red Mormon, is a butterfly of the family Papilionidae. It is found in the Philippines but has been recorded as a vagrant to southern Taiwan.

The species was named by Johann Friedrich von Eschscholtz after Nicholas Rumanzow, chancellor of the Russian Empire. It has traditionally been regarded as a species of its own rather than a subspecies of Papilio deiphobus, but the former treatment is still preferred by some.

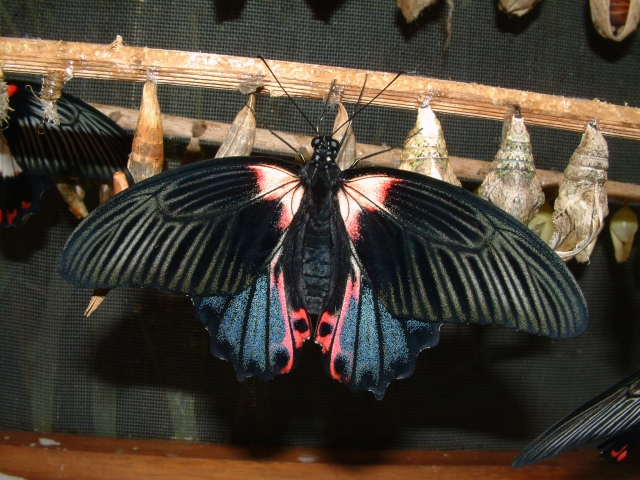

The wingspan is 120–140 mm. The male resembles the male Papilio ascalaphus, but lacks the tail at the bottom wing and has large red patches on the ventral side (underside) of the wings. In contrast, the female has distinct red markings on both sides of the wings.

== Description in Seitz ==
P. rumanzovia Eschsch. (krusensternia Eschsch., florida Godt., amalthion Bdv., ciris Fruhst., spinturnix Fruhst.) Tailless but with distinct tooth at the 3 radial.; both wings beneath with large brilliant red basal patch, the submarginal and admarginal spots of the hindwing likewise glaring red. Male black forewing with rather faint bluish grey stripes before the distal margin, of which the anterior ones mostly extend nearly to the cell; hindwing between the veins with broad bluish grey double stripes, which form a very broad band, the inner margin is twisted somewhat in s-shape. The anterior red spots of the hindwing beneath united into hooks and the posterior ones into rings.Some males have above a red anal ring on the hindwing. In the female the forewing in the cell and along the veins with white grey stripes which are light, especially beneath; several forms :- female-f. semperinus Haase (26 c), forewing almost as dark as in the male but also above with large red basal spot, which is continued on the hindwing by a red band parallel with the abdominal margin; the rest of the hindwing above black with blue stripes; but the longitudinal band is often more or less whitish and widened and in that case a number of admarginal and submarginal spots are also present. The second main form is female -f. rumanzovia Eschsch. (— descombesi Bdv.) (27 a). The stripes of the forewing above and beneath at least partly white, the hindwing with large white central area, which extends from near the abdominal margin into the cell; according to Semper the specimens of this form from the Philippines have always a red basal spot on the upperside of the forewing; on Siao, Sangir and Talaut on the contrary the basal spot is often very small or entirely absent, some specimens moreover present a very strikingly different appearance through the white area of the hindwing being reduced and the 4.—6. admarginal spot very large,( isolated) and red-white:[this is] female –f. eubalia form. nov. (type from Siao) (48 c). from Siao) (48 c).Larva green, with strongly swollen thorax; a spectacle-band on the thorax and behind it a raised yellowish band, which is connected laterally with a yellowish or greenish longitudinal stripe, on the abdomen an oblique band and a transverse one, not interrupted and like the anal segment whitish; the scent-fork orange. Pupa as in P. memnon. The butterfly on all the islands of the Philippines (Mindoro, Luzon, Mindanao, etc.), as well as on the Siao, Sangir and Talaut Islands to the north of Celebes; common. The semperinus form. of the female resembles P. semperi, the red longitudinal stripe on the wings mimics the red abdomen of semperi; but this form is also found on the Talaut Islands, where semperi does not occur.

The larvae feed on Citrus species.

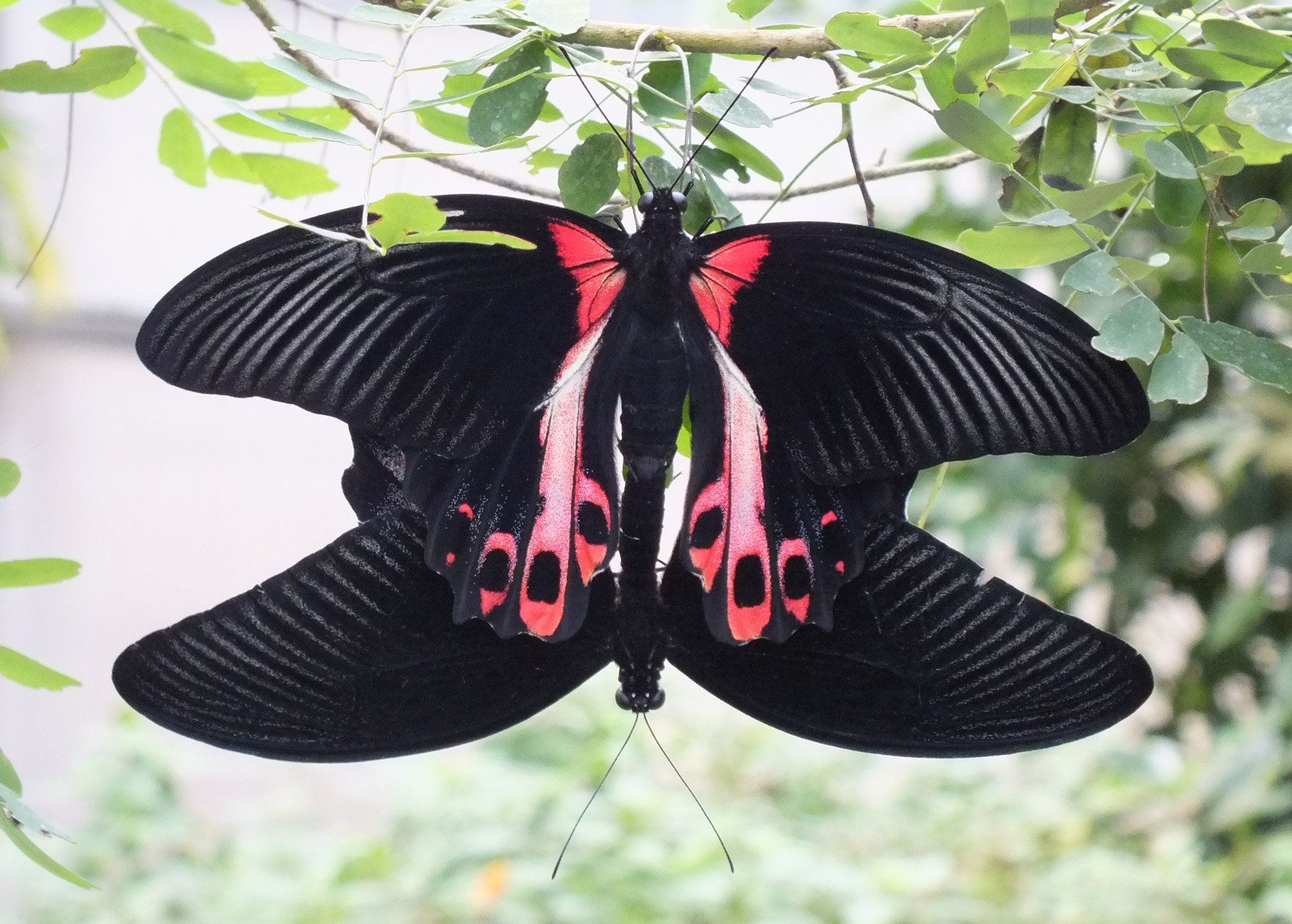
Mating
