= Bernard H. Moormann House =

Historic house in Ohio, United States

- U.S. National Register of Historic Places
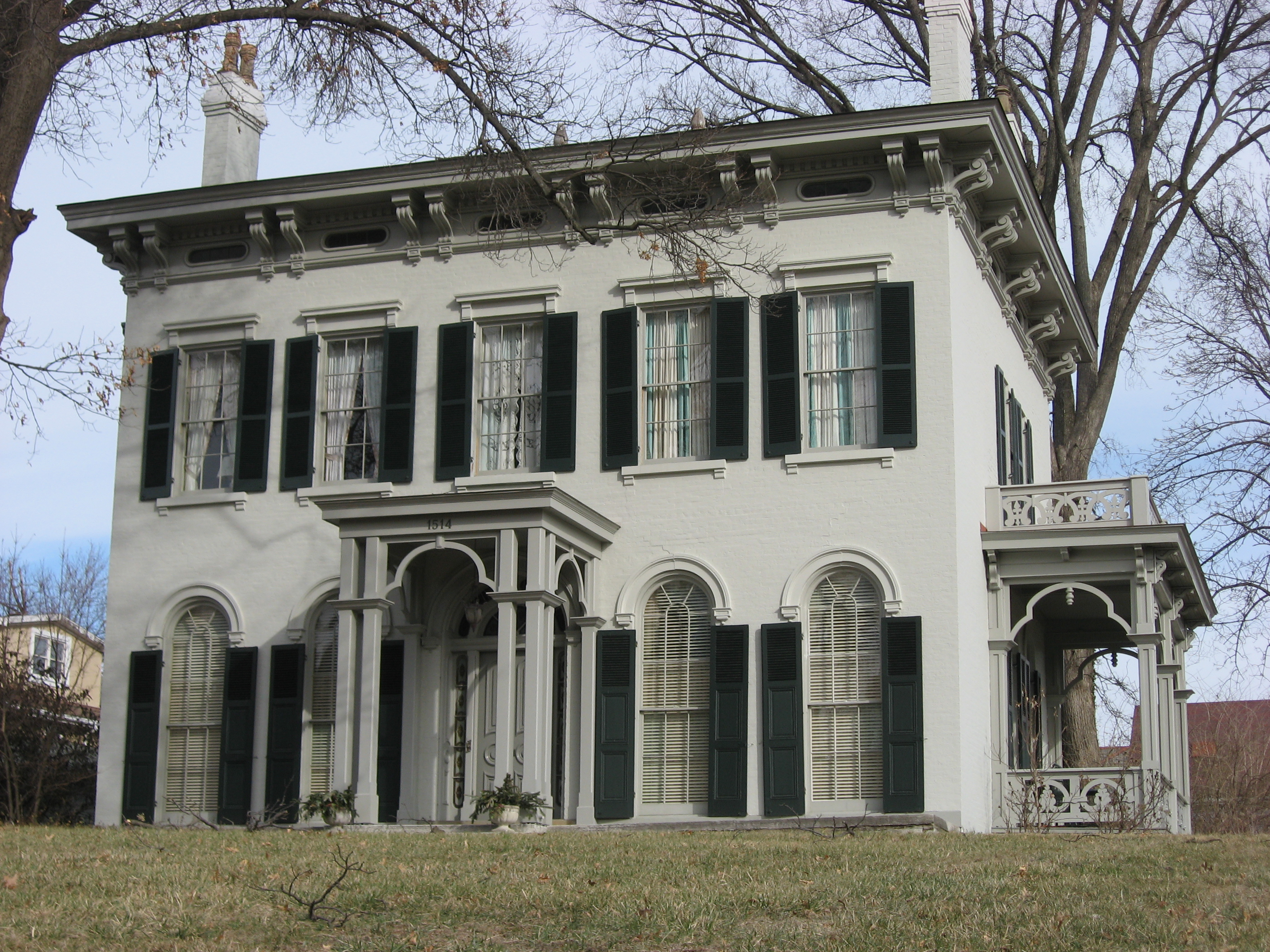
- Front of the house

- Location within Ohio Location within the United States
- Location: 1514 E. McMillan St., Cincinnati, Ohio
- Coordinates: 39°7′31″N 84°28′38″W
- Area: Less than 1 acre (0.40 ha)
- Built: 1860
- Architectural style: Italianate
- NRHP reference No.: 73001462
- Added to NRHP: March 20, 1973

The Bernard H. Moormann House is a historic residence in eastern Cincinnati, Ohio, United States. Built in 1860 in the Italianate style, it is one of the most significant buildings in the neighborhood of East Walnut Hills.

By 1860, Bernard Moormann had established himself as one of Cincinnati's leading dry goods merchants. Choosing to build a new house in East Walnut Hills, he selected a two-and-a-half-story design built of brick. Except for a small ell on the western side of the rear, it is a simple rectangle in shape. Measuring five bays wide, the south-facing front of the house features such elements such as varied shapes of windows and an archway around the front door, plus ornamented lintels around the second-floor windows. Surrounding the front entrance is a small porch with multiple columns, and sheltering the entire house is a large detailed cornice at the level of the attic.

Both before and after Moormann's residence in the house, it experienced few changes: into the late twentieth century, it was one of the best remaining examples of nineteenth-century residential architecture remaining in Cincinnati's more suburban neighborhoods. Because of its place as an example of leading local architecture, the Moormann House was listed on the National Register of Historic Places in 1973.
