= Soviet cruiser Murmansk =

At least two cruisers of the Soviet Navy have borne the name Murmansk, after the city and naval base of Murmansk:

- Soviet cruiser Murmansk (1944) was the former USS Milwaukee, an Omaha-class cruiser transferred to the USSR in 1944 and decommissioned in 1949.
- Soviet cruiser Murmansk (1955) was a Sverdlov-class cruiser launched in 1955. She was decommissioned in 1989 and sold for scrapping in 1994, but was wrecked while being towed to the breakers.
