= Moerman Therapy =

Purported cancer treatment

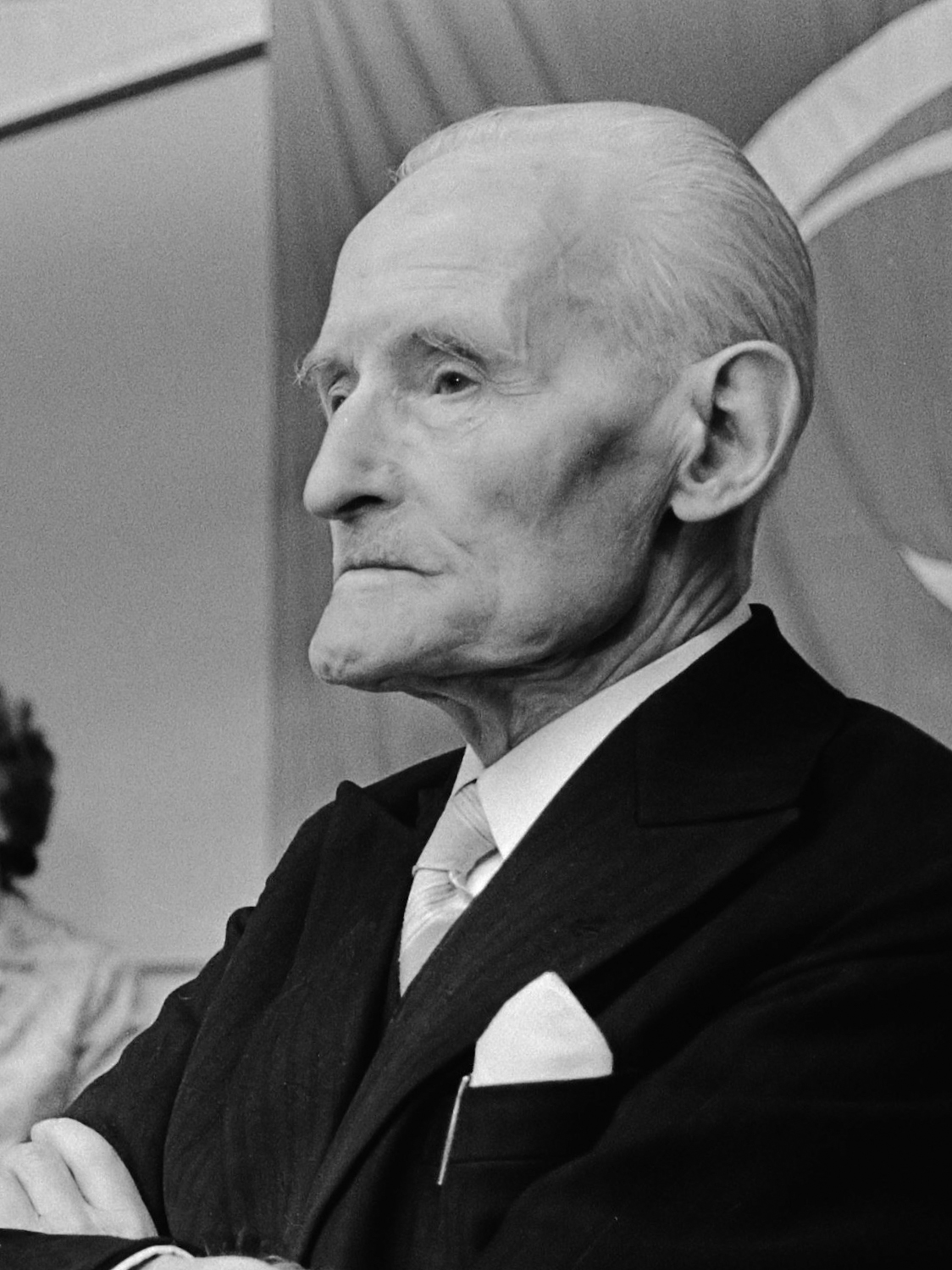
Moerman in 1979

The Moerman Therapy, also called Moerman Method or Moerman Diet is an alternative cancer treatment from the Dutch practitioner Cornelis Moerman (1893–1988). There is no clinical evidence that it is effective as a cancer treatment. Moerman therapy has been criticized for unsubstantiated health claims and is considered quackery by medical experts.

== History ==
Moerman who experimented with pigeons in the 1930s argued that he had identified "mysterious suppressors" of the cancer cell and there are "eight essential substances" that maintain human health. He claimed that deficiency of these substances leads to metabolic disturbances and anomalies of regeneration tissue that enable microorganisms which he termed "symbionts" to convert healthy cells into cancer cells. The eight substances he identified were vitamins A, B, E, citric acid, iron, iodine and sulphur. He later added Vitamin C. He argued that a high oxidation capacity in pigeons was what protected the birds from getting cancer. Moerman stated that cancer was not a local disease but was a disturbed oxidation from the result of inadequate nutrition which led to loss of "fermentation processes" and vitality in the cell.

According to Quackwatch the Moerman diet is a vegetarian diet that "prohibited all meats, all fish and shellfish, alcohol, animal fats, artificial colorings, beans, peas, lentils, mushrooms, potatoes, red cabbage, saurkraut [sic], cheeses with high fat and salt content, margerine [sic] and other hydrogenated oils, coffee, cocoa or caffeine containing [sic] teas, egg whites, sugar, salt, white flour, and tobacco." The alleged "symbionts" that Moerman proposed have never been shown to exist.

Moerman began putting his diet therapy into practice in the 1940s. His vegetarian diet consisted of fresh vegetables (also as juice), fresh fruit, whole grains with dairy products and egg yolks. In the 1940s, four medical journals rejected Moerman's submissions due to lack of scientific quality.

Moerman admitted that he had never read a medical journal after graduating. He assessed his patients by sitting opposite them and smoking a cigar. He hardly examined his patients and did not consult with other physicians. He also treated patients without meeting them. In 1958, Moerman authored his first book The Solution to the Cancer Problem. Supporters of Moerman noted the similarity of his diet to the Gerson diet. In 1978, he authored his second book on cancer and diet therapy which went through 11 editions.

Moerman died of a brain haemorrhage in 1988. He never married.

== Investigations ==
In 1949, Moerman self-published his first paper and sent it to senior officials in the Public Health sector and Willem Drees. There was an investigation into Moerman's therapy and a report published in 1950. It stated that "Moerman is a man with a serious lack of critical faculty and the treatment results obtained do not support Moerman's claims of recovery".

In the 1955, Moerman reported successful cancer cures with his therapy that were advertised in the De Typhoon newspaper. In response, a 1956 medical team known as the Delprat committee was established to investigate these claims. In 1958, the committee published their report which found that no case had extended the lifespan of any cancer patient by Moerman therapy alone. Moerman took issue with all the committee members and filed a complaint against them with the medical disciplinary board. The complaint was rejected and he was fined a thousand guilders by the disciplinary board for "undermining confidence in the medical profession" and "criticizing the generally accepted procedure in the Netherlands in front of patients".

In 1991, a Retrospective Research on Moerman Therapy (ROM) group was established. The ROM report found that out of an estimated 100,000 patients only 384 patients had reported to have been cured by it over a period of nearly 50 years. On further investigation of these only 21 cases could be attributed with certainty to the Moerman therapy but even many of these cases were of dubious grounds as it was not clear in all cases whether the diagnosis of cancer was correct. It was noted that this number is smaller than the number of cases of the rare spontaneous regression of cancer that could be expected.

In 2000, Moerman's invention of the diet earned him a place at the head of "a list of the twenty biggest quacks of the twentieth century" as decided by the Dutch Association Against Quackery.

== See also ==
- List of ineffective cancer treatments
