= Caspicola =

Scientific classification
- Domain: Eukaryota
- Kingdom: Animalia
- Phylum: Arthropoda
- Class: Malacostraca
- Order: Amphipoda
- Family: Caspicolidae
- Genus: Caspicola; Derzhavin, 1945
- Species: C. knipovitschi

Binomial name
- Caspicola knipovitschi Derzhavin, 1944

Genus of crustaceans

Caspicola is a monotypic genus of crustaceans belonging to the monotypic family Caspicolidae. The only species is Caspicola knipovitschi.
