= Murmansk Governorate (1920) =

1920 unit of Russia

Murmansk Governorate (Russian: Му́рманская губе́рния) was a short-lived administrative division (a guberniya) established by the White government on the Kola Peninsula in Russia.

The governorate was established on February 2, 1920 by the Resolution of the Provisional Government of the Northern Region. It included Alexandrovsky and Kemsky Uyezds of Arkhangelsk Governorate and parts of Olonets Governorate. The governorate proved to be short-lived—the Soviet power on the Kola Peninsula was restored on February 21, 1920, and on March 16, 1920 by the Order No. 44 of the Arkhangelsk Governorate Revolutionary Committee Murmansk Governorate was formally abolished effective February 21. Alexandrovsky and Kemsky Uyezds were restored in their 1917 borders.
