= Nikolai Tchaikovsky =

Russian revolutionary (1851–1926)

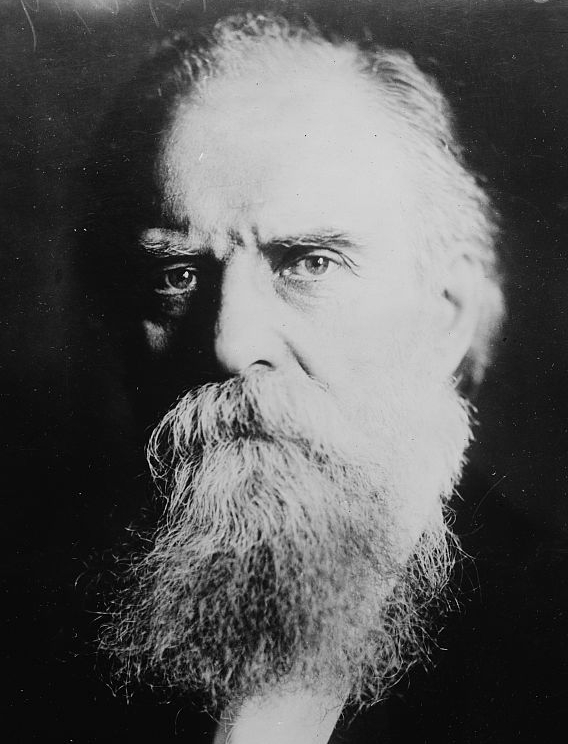
- Born: 7 January 1851 (NS)/ 26 December 1850 (OS); Vyatka, Russian Empire
- Died: 30 April 1926 (aged 76); Harrow, London, England
- Occupation: Revolutionary

Nikolai Vasilyevich Tchaikovsky (Russian: Никола́й Васи́льевич Чайко́вский; 7 January 1851 [O.S. 26 December 1850] – 30 April 1926) was a Russian revolutionary.

== Biography ==
Tchaikovsky was born on 7 January 1851, in Vyatka. He spent the first part of his life on his mother's estate, and studied at a public school at Vyatka and later on in St. Petersburg. In 1868, he entered the St. Petersburg University, and got his degree in chemistry in 1872. While studying in St. Petersburg, he joined a radical student group, which would later be known as the Circle of Tchaikovsky after its most famous member. The group advocated revolutionary socialist ideals which formed the basis of the Narodnik movement.

However, under the political régime of Russia in the 1870s, no public body or society could act freely if its activity was not fully approved by the government. Much effort was expended to suppress the promoters of the Narodnik movement, and Tchaikovsky was twice arrested. Under these conditions, the new party soon lost its educational character and became a revolutionary and terrorist association. Tchaikovsky did not approve of this new tendency and joined a social-religious group, which received the name of "God-men" because its members tried to find in themselves a reflection of God. However, they were still followers of Russian Orthodoxy.

In 1874, Tchaikovsky left Russia, and a year later he went to the United States with a small party of men and women who shared his political views and religious feelings. They founded a communistic settlement at "Cedar Vale", near Wichita, Kansas, and tried to work out their new religious and social teaching. The experiment proved a failure. In 1876, Tchaikovsky and his friends were obliged to recognize that mankind was not yet ready for the communistic life, which they believed to be an imminent development of the future. They regarded communistic life as senseless without a constant feeling of the presence of God in the case of each member of the community, and this essential condition could not be achieved. Therefore, they returned to the "old world of antagonism." The awakening was especially hard for Tchaikovsky, who not only found it necessary to reconstruct his conception of the world, but had a family to keep and no means of livelihood. He worked for some time as an ordinary workman in a shipbuilding yard and in a sugar factory near Philadelphia. His health broke down and with his family he joined the religious community of the Shakers, where he remained for a year.

In 1879, he returned to Europe, and in 1880 took up his residence in England, renewing his active participation in the Russian revolutionary organizations abroad. He met Peter Kropotkin, a former member of the Tchaikovsky Circle, in London in 1881, and together they attempted to organize English workers.

He was a member of the "Red Cross of the Narodnaia Volia", and organized the supply of revolutionary literature to Russia. In 1905, during the first Russian revolution, he made a tour of America, lecturing on the subject and collecting funds for the struggle against the Imperial regime. In 1907, he returned to Russia. There he was arrested on a charge of conspiracy against the Government and spent 11 months in the St. Peter and St. Paul Fortress at St. Petersburg. He was released on bail, £5,000 having been collected by his friends, chiefly in England and the United States. In 1910, he was brought to trial, but discharged for lack of proof. He remained in Russia and took a great interest in the work of cooperative organizations.

During World War I, he was very active under the flag of the Russian Red Cross, supplying food to the population of the fighting area. After the February Revolution of 1917, he was elected member of the Petrograd Soviet, where he used his influence to oppose Bolshevik propaganda. After the Bolshevik October revolution of 1917, He was elected member of the short-lived Constituent Assembly. As a member of the "Committee for the Salvation of the Motherland and of the Revolution", and of the "Committee for the Defence of the Constituent Assembly", he helped organize the struggle against the Bolsheviks in the ensuing Russian Civil War.

In 1918, Tchaikovsky was one of the founders of the "Union of the Reconstruction of Russia", an anti-Bolshevik organization of the left parties of Moscow. He was also elected member of the Ufa directorate. On his way to Siberia, he came to Vyatka, where he took the lead in an insurrection against the Bolsheviks and entered into negotiations with the Allied force at Arkhangelsk. He took part in the coup d'état of August 2 at Arkhangelsk and became president of the Supreme Administrative Board of the North Region. After the break-up of a conspiracy of monarchist officers, he organized the Provisional Government of the Northern Region under his own leadership. Tchaikovsky was sent by his government to Paris, where he represented the interests of the North Region before the Versailles Conference. He was a member of the "Russian Political Delegation" in Paris until its dissolution in February 1921.

He was an active member of the irregular freemasonic lodge, the Grand Orient of Russia's Peoples. Tchaikovsky died in Harrow, London, England, on 30 April 1926, at the age of 76.
