= Saint Andrew (research vessel) =

History

Russia
- Name: Saint Andrew (1899–1910); Murman (1910–)
- Completed: 1899

General characteristics
- Type: Research vessel
- Displacement: 430 tons (336 tons according to some sources)
- Speed: 11 knots

Saint Andrew (Russian: Андрей Первозванный) (Note: Literally "Andrew the First-Called", as that is how Saint Andrew is usually called in Russia) was the first purpose-built research vessel of the Russian Empire, and one of the world's first fisheries science vessels.

In the late 19th century, those Russian leaders concerned with the welfare of the Pomors (settlers of the Russian north, particularly on the White Sea coast) became convinced of the need to provide more scientific support for the area's fishing industry (a major activity for the Pomors). Accordingly, with the assent of Finance Minister Sergei Witte, Saint Andrew was commissioned. Formally, construction of the ship was funded by the "Aid Committee For The Settlers Of The Russian North", but actually the construction was paid for out of the imperial treasury.

Saint Andrew was built to specifications developed by fisheries science pioneer Nikolai Knipovich, in the German Bremer Vulkan shipyard. It was designed as a yacht, but with a stern rigged for trawling. Construction began in 1897 and the ship was launched in 1899. (Expeditions began before that, in 1898, using the small sailing vessel Pomor, which had been purchased in Norway.)

Until 1907, Saint Andrew was an expedition vessel for field expeditions of the Murman Scientific Fisheries Expedition, based in Aleksandrovsk-on-Murman (now Polyarny) near Murmansk. The expeditions were led by Nikolai Knipovich (and later Leonid L. Breytfus). Research carried out on this vessel was the beginning of commercial oceanography.

Captain Chicagov in 1906

From the beginning of its voyages, Vasily N. Chichagov (a descendant of the noble Chichagov family and a seaman and student of hydrography from the Saint Petersburg Yacht Club) was a member of expeditions, serving as captain of Saint Andrew from 1903 to 1907. (After Saint Andrew was sold, Chichagov worked for the Directorate of Lighthouses and Navigation in the White Sea.)

In 1906 the Murman Scientific Fisheries Expedition lost its financial support (there had been some earlier government dissatisfaction with what was perceived as over-emphasis on pure science as opposed to immediately practical research) and soon shut down. In 1907 Saint Andrew was transferred to the Russian Navy. In 1910, the ship was renamed Murman.
