= Provisional Government of the Northern Region =

Government of Northern Oblast (1918–1920)

Provisional Government of the Northern Region (Severnaya Oblast) Временное правительство Северной области (ВПСО) Severnyy Krai Северный край
- 1918–1920
- Flag

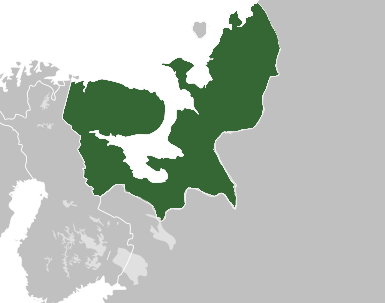
- The Provisional Government of the Northern Region in September 1918
- Capital: Arkhangelsk (until 19 February 1920)
- Common languages: Russian
- Government: Provisional government Krai of the Russian State (1919-1920)
- Supreme Ruler
  - 18 November 1918-15 January 1920: Alexander Kolchak
- Chairman
  - 28 September 1918-19 February 1920: Nikolai Tchaikovsky
- Chief administrator
  - 10 September 1919-19 February 1920: Yevgeny Miller
- Historical era: World War I Russian Civil War
  - Established: 28 September 1918
  - Arkhangelsk and Murmansk was reintegrated into the Russian Socialist Federative Soviet Republic: 21 February 1920
Preceded by	Succeeded by
Supreme Administration of Northern Region; Russian Socialist Federative Soviet Republic	Russian Socialist Federative Soviet Republic; Republic of Finland

The Provisional Government of the Northern Region (Severnaya Oblast), also called Severnyy Krai, was a White movement, Anti-Bolshevik left-wing, and Allied provisional government and a krai of the Russian State.

== History ==
On 28 September 1918, Provisional Government of the Northern Region was established. In October 1918, the Northern Region recognized the supreme authority of the Ufa Directory, along with abolishing all the soviets and restored zemstvos. On 30 April 1919, the Northern Region recognized the supreme authority of the Provisional All-Russian Government. On 19 October 1919, the Northern Region turned into department for civil affairs under chief administrator of Northern Region but use of former name (Provisional Government of the Northern Region) continued. On 19 February 1920, the Northern Region government evacuated from Arkhangelsk to Norway. On 21 February 1920, Arkhangelsk and Murmansk was reintegrated into the Russian Socialist Federative Soviet Republic. On 13 March 1920, regular Soviet troops reached Murmansk.

== Administrative divisions ==
On 2 February 1920, the Murmansk Governorate was created by a resolution of the Provisional Government of the Provisional Government of the Northern Region. It included Alexandrovsky and Kemsky Uyezds of Arkhangelsk Governorate and parts of the Olonets Governorate.

== Chairman of the Provisional Government of the Northern Region (Severnaya Oblast) ==
Independent
Popular Socialists

Portrait	Name (Birth–Death)	Term of office		Political party	Head of State
	Nikolai Tchaikovsky (1851–1926)	28 September 1918	19 February 1920	Popular Socialists	
	Nikolai Tchaikovsky (1851–1926)	28 September 1918	19 February 1920	Popular Socialists	Ufa Directory
	Nikolai Tchaikovsky (1851–1926)	28 September 1918	19 February 1920	Popular Socialists	Alexander Kolchak (1918 — 1920)

=== Acting Chairman of the Provisional Government of the Northern Region (Severnaya Oblast) ===
Independent
Constitutional Democratic Party

Portrait	Name (Birth–Death)	Term of office		Political party	Head of State
	Pyotr Zubov (1871–1942)	23 January 1919	10 February 1920	Constitutional Democratic Party	
	Yevgeny Miller (1867–1939)	10 February 1920	19 February 1920	Independent	

== Chief administrator of Northern Region (Severnyy Krai) ==
Independent

Portrait	Name (Birth–Death)	Term of office		Political party	Head of State
	Yevgeny Miller (1867–1939)	10 September 1919	19 February 1920	Independent	
	Yevgeny Miller (1867–1939)	10 September 1919	19 February 1920	Independent	Alexander Kolchak (1918 — 1920)

== Territorial control ==
During its height of control, the Provisional Government of the Northern Region controlled the overwhelming majority of the Arkhangelsk Governorate (using the 1917 governorate borders of the Russian Republic), about half of the Olonets Governorate (using the 1917 governorate borders of the Russian Republic), and a tiny part of the Vologda Governorate (using the 1917 governorate borders of the Russian Republic).

=== Maps ===
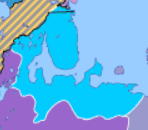
The Provisional Government of the Northern Region on 1 November 1918

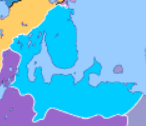
The Provisional Government of the Northern Region on 1 December 1918

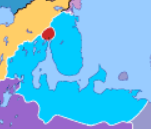
The Provisional Government of the Northern Region on 3 February 1919

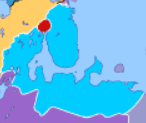
The Provisional Government of the Northern Region on 30 April 1919

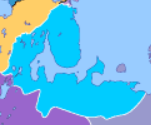
The Provisional Government of the Northern Region on 1 August 1919

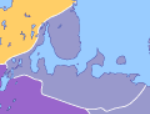
The Provisional Government of the Northern Region on 1 November 1919

The Provisional Government of the Northern Region on 3 January 1920
