= Morman =

Breton chieftain

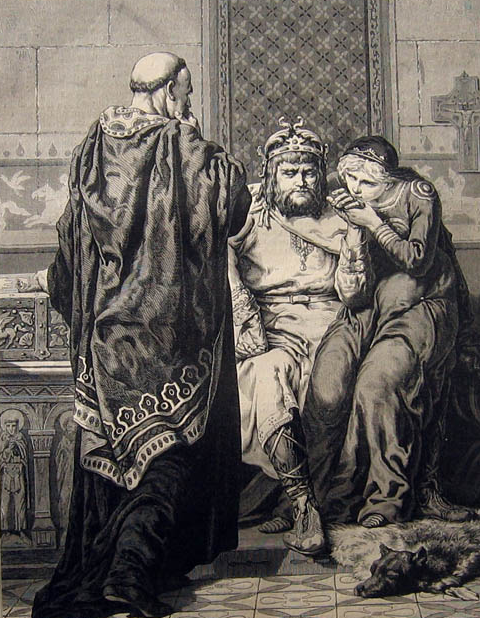
1875 illustration of Morman (center)

Morman (also spelled Morvan, Morwan, or Moruuan) (died 818) was a Breton chieftain who was declared king (rex) after the death of the Bretons' Frankish overlord Charlemagne in 814. He is the first person known by name to be described as a Breton "king". He probably ruled a warband with members drawn from throughout Brittany. He had a stronghold defended by ditches, hedges and marshes.

Morman had been a faithful follower of Charlemagne, having sworn oaths to him and performed the giving of hands, probably becoming his vassus, although the Bretons rose up in rebellion in 811. Morman's rebellion against Frankish lordship in 814 threatened the integrity of Charlemagne's empire, recently inherited by Louis the Pious. While the Bretons may have viewed the elevation of Morman as king on the death of Charlemagne as legitimate, the Frankish writers Astronomus and Ermold the Black saw it as a usurpation. Louis sent Abbot Witchar to negotiate with Morman. According to Ermold, the abbot asked, "Do you not remember your sworn fealty, or your right hand to the Franks / often given, and to Charles the service you showed?" After failing to bring Morman to accept Frankish rule through diplomacy, Louis prepared to invade Brittany.

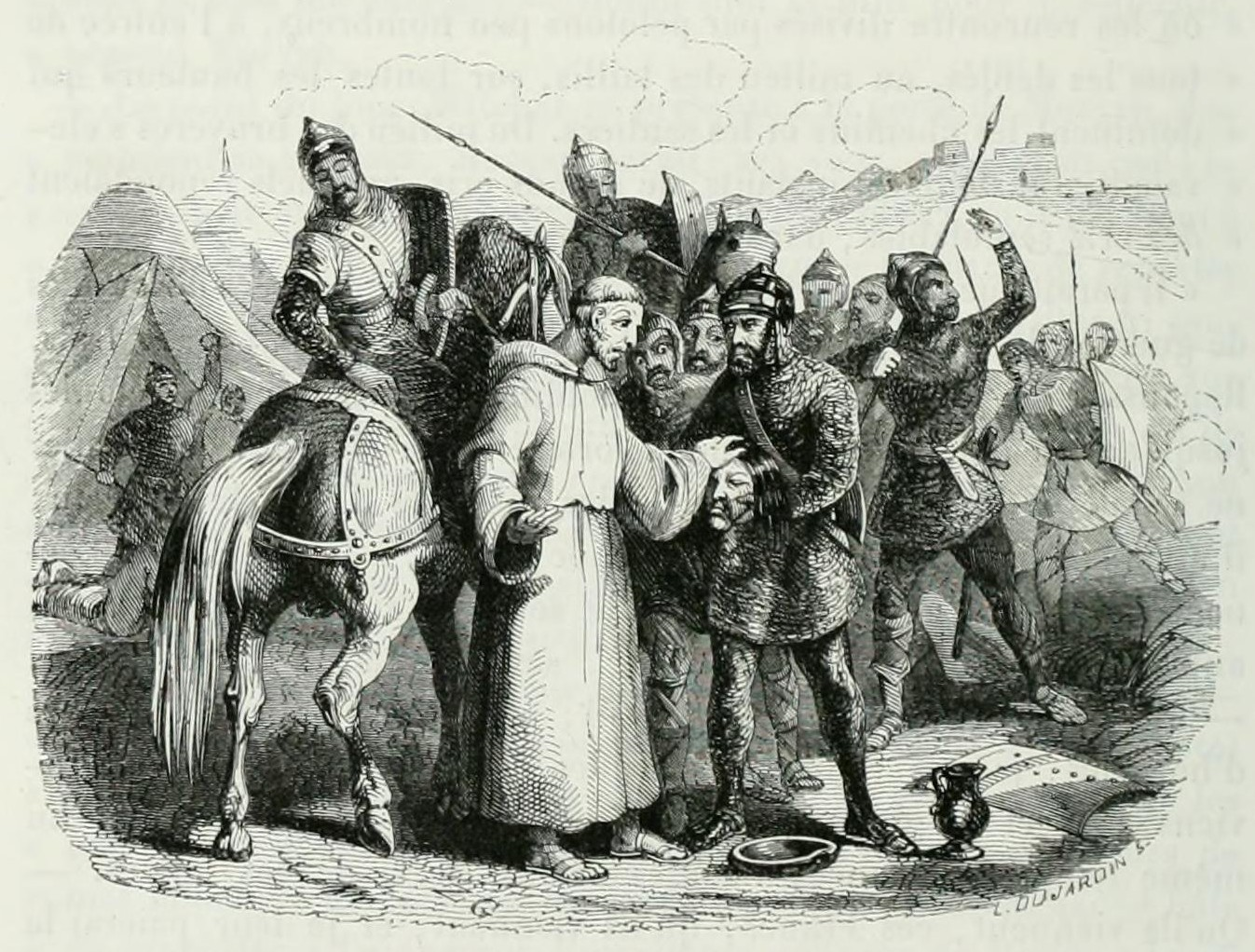
Illustration of Morman's severed head held after a 818 battle

In the spring of 818, Louis's army, composed of forces from all the Frankish regna (literally "kingdoms", but actually subkingdoms), assembled at Vannes, the westernmost point of actual Frankish control, and marched to Priziac in the far west of the county of the Vannetais on the bank of the river Ellé. The Franks launched a series of attacks on various Breton fortresses. After Morman was killed in battle, resistance collapsed. According to the Chronicle of Moissac, Louis returned with a "triumph of victory", although the Bretons revolted again in 822 under Wihomarc.
