= Nikolai Knipovich =

Russian zoologist

Nikolai Mikhailovich Knipovich
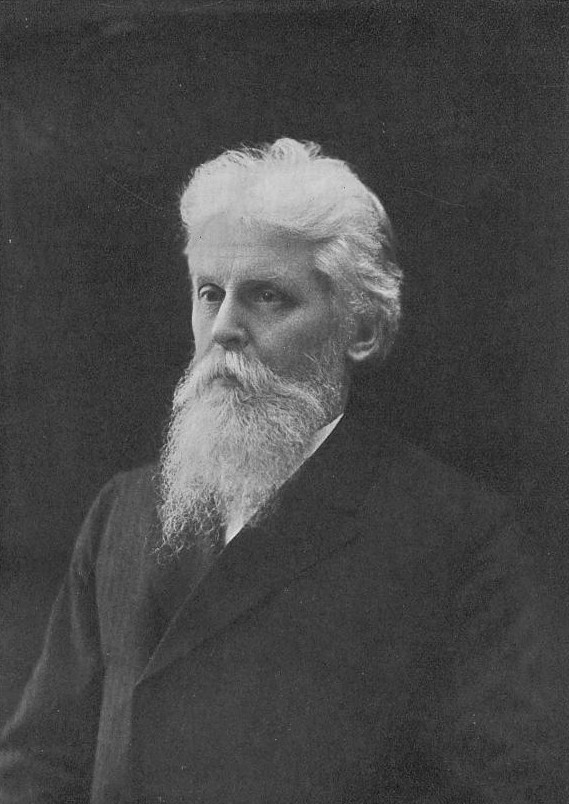
- Born: April 6, 1862; Sveaborg, Grand Duchy of Finland
- Died: February 23, 1939 (aged 76); Leningrad, Russia, Soviet Union
- Citizenship: Russia / Soviet
- Education: University of St. Petersburg
- Scientific career
- Fields: Marine zoology Oceanography

Nikolai Mikhailovich Knipovich (also Knipowitsch) (6 April [O.S. 25 March] 1862 – 23 February 1939) was a Russian and Soviet ichthyologist, marine zoologist and oceanographer, notable as the founder of fisheries research in the Russian North.

== Biography ==
=== General ===
Knipovich graduated from the Saint Petersburg Imperial University in 1886 and went on to defend his master's thesis "Materials for the study of Ascothoracida" in 1892. He was then elected assistant professor of the University in 1893.

From 1894 until 1921 he worked at the Zoological Museum of the St. Petersburg Academy of Sciences. He then became the Professor of biology and zoology in the First Women's Medical Institute (present-day Saint Petersburg State Medical University) in 1911, continuing to fill the position until 1930 .

He became an Honorary Member of the Academy of Sciences of the USSR in 1935.

=== Expeditions ===
Knipovich organised and led the Scientific Murman Expedition from a location on the Barents Sea Murman Coast between 1898 and 1901, which marked the beginning of systematic study of the region's biological resources. A special modern marine research vessel, the steamship Saint Andrew, was built for the expedition and in May 1900 Knipovich led an expedition to undertake hydrographic and biological observations along Kola shores from the Murman Coast to 73°00'N. He then, in Autumn 1901, drew a chart of currents based on the data gathered on water temperature and salinity and identified several warm streams. In 1902 he was the first to draw a conclusion on a relationship between distribution and migration of commercial fish in the Barents Sea and warm currents. From the Saint Andrew and another vessel, Pomor, hydrographic observations were carried out at over 1,500 stations and biological studies at about 2,000.

His other expeditions included some to the Caspian Sea (1886, 1904, 1912–1913, 1914–1915, 1931–32), the Baltic Sea (1902) and the Black Sea (1922–1927). His request to carry out a scientific and fisheries related expedition to the Azov Sea and secure the ship "Besstrashny" was approved by Lenin personally.

=== International work and activities ===
Knipovich was extensively involved in international collaboration. In 1901 he attended the Second Conference of the International Council for the Exploration of the Sea in Christiania (Oslo, Norway) and was voted one of the vice-presidents of the Council. Between 1926 and 1927 he was a major proponent of German-Soviet cooperation in the studies of the Barents Sea and was heavily involved in the Polar Commission of the USSR Academy of Sciences.

=== Legacy ===
Knipovich authored numerous monographs on hydrology and fisheries in the Arctic Ocean, Barents Sea, Caspian Sea, Azov Sea, and Black Sea, as well as a number of studies on the taxonomy and ecology of marine invertebrates (molluscs and parasitic barnacles) and on the geological history of the northern seas.

== Honours ==
- Street renamed after him in connection with his 100th anniversary – from "Kol'skaya Street" to "Knipovich Street" in Murmansk, Russia.
- Mid-Atlantic Ridge named after him – Knipovich Ridge (between Greenland and Spitsbergen).
- Bay in the Arctic named after him – Knipovich Bay, High Arctic northern Taimyr.
- Cape named after him – Cape Knipovich (Franz Joseph Land).
- Vessels named after him – sailing boat "Nikolay Knipovich", onboard of which regular oceanographic observations were carried out between 1928 and 1941 on the "Kola Section", and R/V "Akademik Knipovich", a Russian research vessel, which collected materials between 1965 and 1967.
- The Knipovich Polar Research Institute of Marine Fisheries and Oceanography (PINRO) was named after him in 1935.
- Honorary member of the Academy of Sciences of the USSR, 1935.

=== Taxa named after Knipovich ===
Genera

- Knipowitschia Iljin, 1927: a genus of gobiid fishes
- (Knipowitschiatrema Issaitschikov, 1927 (accepted as Galactosomum Looss 1899), a genus of trematodes.)

Species

- Akerogammarus knipowitschi Derzhavin & Pjatakova, 1967 (amphipod crustacean)
- Alosa caspia knipowitschi (Iljin, 1927) (clupeid fish)
- Anabaena knipowitschii Usachev, 1927 = Anabaenopsis knipowitschii (Usachev) Komárek, 2005 (cyanobacterium)
- Anonyx knipowitschi Gurjanova, 1962 (amphipod crustacean)
- Careproctus knipowitschi Chernova, 2005 (liparid fish)
- Caspia knipowitchi Makarov, 1938 (gastropod mollusc)
- Caspicola knipovitschi Derzhavin, 1944 (amphipod crustacean)
- Caspiomysis knipowitschi G.O. Sars, 1907 (mysid crustacean)
- Chasarocuma knipowitchi Derzhavin, 1912 (cumacean crustacean)
- Dyopedos knipowitschi (Gurjanova, 1933) (amphipod crustacean)
- Filippovia knipovitchi (Filippova, 1972) (cephalopod mollusc)
- Gieysztoria knipovici (Beklemischev, 1953) (turbellarian)
- Limnocletodes knipowitschi (G.O. Sars, 1927) (copepod crustacean])
- Lumbrineris knipovichana Orenzanz, 1973 (polychaete)
- Monodacna knipowitschi (Logvinenko & Starobogatov, 1966) (bivalve mollusc)
- Peridinium knipowitschii Ussatschew (dinoflagellate)
- Sarritor knipowitschi Lindberg & Andriashev, 1937 (agonid fish)

== Selected publications ==
- Knipovich, N.M. (1892). Materials for the study of Ascothoracida (Materialy k poznaniiu gruppy Ascothoracida). St. Petersburg: Tip. V. Demakova. p. 155. Archived from the original on 2016-03-28.
- Knipovich, N.M. (1902). Expedition for Research and Fisheries Investigations at the Murman Coast (1898-1990). p. 605.
- Knipovich, N.M. (1906). Principles of Hydrology in the European Arctic Ocean. St. Petersburg: Tip. M.M. Stasyulevich. p. 1518.
- Knipovich, N.M. (1914–15). Hydrological Explorations in the Caspian Sea. Petrograd.
- Knipovich, N.M. (1923). Identification guide of the fishes of the Black and Azov Seas (Opredelitel Ryb Chernogo i Azovskogo morei). Moscow. p. 144.
- "Hydrological investigations in the Black Sea". Sci. Work of the Azov-Black-Sea Scientific Producers Expedition (10). Moscow: 272. 1939.
