= Zelentsy =

Zelentsy (Russian: Зеленцы) is the name of several rural localities in Russia.

Modern localities

- Zelentsy, Krasnoyarsk Krai, a village in Prichulymsky Selsoviet of Achinsky District of Krasnoyarsk Krai
- Zelentsy (railway station), Novgorod Oblast, an inhabited locality classified as a railway station in Uspenskoye Settlement of Chudovsky District of Novgorod Oblast
- Zelentsy (village), Novgorod Oblast, a village in Uspenskoye Settlement of Chudovsky District of Novgorod Oblast

Historical localities

- Zelentsy, Arkhangelsk Governorate, a colony included in Alexandrovskaya Volost of Alexandrovsky Uyezd of Arkhangelsk Governorate of the Russian SFSR upon its establishment in 1920
