= Volokovy =

Volokovy (Russian: Волоковый; masculine), Volokovaya (Волоковая; feminine), or Volokovoye (Волоковое; neuter) is the name of several rural localities in Russia:

Modern localities

- Volokovoye, a village in Kirikovsky Selsoviet of Pirovsky District of Krasnoyarsk Krai
- Volokovaya, Nenets Autonomous Okrug, a village in Peshsky Selsoviet of Zapolyarny District of Nenets Autonomous Okrug
- Volokovaya, Smolensk Oblast, a village in Volokovskoye Rural Settlement of Smolensky District of Smolensk Oblast

Historical localities

- Volokovaya, Arkhangelsk Governorate, a colony included in Alexandrovskaya Volost of Alexandrovsky Uyezd of Arkhangelsk Governorate of the Russian SFSR upon its establishment in 1920
