= Belokamenny =

Belokamenny (Russian: Белокаменный; masculine), Belokamennaya (Белокаменная; feminine), or Belokamennoye (Белокаменное; neuter) is the name of several rural localities in Russia.

== Modern localities ==
- Belokamenny (Rural locality), a rural locality (a settlement) under the administrative jurisdiction of the Town of Asbest in Sverdlovsk Oblast

== Historical localities ==
- Belokamennaya, a colony included in Alexandrovskaya Volost of Alexandrovsky Uyezd of Arkhangelsk Governorate of the Russian SFSR upon its establishment in 1920

== Other ==
- Belokamennaya (Moscow Central Circle), a train station on the Moscow Central Circle
