= Minkino =

Minkino (Russian: Минькино or Минкино) is the name of several rural localities in Russia:

- Minkino, Kirov Oblast, a village in Biserovsky Rural Okrug of Afanasyevsky District of Kirov Oblast
- Minkino, Kostroma Oblast, a village in Sudayskoye Settlement of Chukhlomsky District of Kostroma Oblast
- Minkino, Murmansk Oblast, a selo in Mezhdurechensky Territorial Okrug of Kolsky District of Murmansk Oblast
- Minkino, Novgorod Oblast, a village in Kirovskoye Settlement of Moshenskoy District of Novgorod Oblast
- Minkino, Novosokolnichesky District, Pskov Oblast, a village in Novosokolnichesky District, Pskov Oblast
- Minkino, Ostrovsky District, Pskov Oblast, a village in Ostrovsky District, Pskov Oblast
- Minkino, Oleninsky District, Tver Oblast, a village in Oleninsky District, Tver Oblast
- Minkino, Penovsky District, Tver Oblast, a village in Penovsky District, Tver Oblast
- Minkino, Babushkinsky District, Vologda Oblast, a village in Bereznikovsky Selsoviet of Babushkinsky District of Vologda Oblast
- Minkino, Gryazovetsky District, Vologda Oblast, a selo in Minkinsky Selsoviet of Gryazovetsky District of Vologda Oblast
