= Kasatonov =

Kasatonov (Russian: Касатонов) is a surname. Notable people with the surname include:

- Alexei Kasatonov (b. 1959), Russian ice hockey player
- Vladimir Kasatonov (1910–1989), Soviet military leader
- Vladimir Lvovich Kasatonov (b. 1962), Russian naval officer
