= Soviet aircraft carrier Riga =

There have been two Russian aircraft carriers laid down as Riga

- Riga, an Admiral Kuznetsov class aircraft carrier laid down in 1981, renamed Leonid Brezhnev in 1982 and again as Admiral Kuznetsov in 1990
- Riga, also an Admiral Kuznetsov class aircraft carrier laid down in 1985 and launched in 1988 renamed Varyag in 1990 but never completed and later sold to China, rebuilt and commissioned as the Chinese aircraft carrier Liaoning.
