= Vladimir Lvovich Kasatonov =

Russian naval officer

Admiral Vladimir Kasatonov
- Kasatonov in 2026

Chairman of the State Duma Committee on Defense
- Incumbent
- Assumed office September 30, 2026
- Preceded by: Andrey Kartapolov

Member of the State Duma
- Incumbent
- Assumed office September 30, 2026

Chief of the Main Staff and First Deputy Commander-in-Chief of the Russian Navy
- In office July 8, 2024 – September 30, 2026
- Preceded by: Aleksandr Nosatov
- Succeeded by: TBA

Personal details
- Born: 17 June 1962 (age 64) Moscow, Russian SFSR, USSR
- Party: United Russia
- Awards: Order of Military Merit; Order of Naval Merit

Military service
- Allegiance: USSR; Russia
- Branch/service: Soviet Navy; Russian Navy
- Years of service: 1984–2026
- Rank: Admiral
- Commands: N. G. Kuznetsov Naval Academy

Admiral Vladimir Lvovich Kasatonov (Russian: Владимир Львович Касатонов; born 17 June 1962) is a Russian politician and former naval officer who is a member of the State Duma and Chairman of the State Duma Committee on Defense since 2026. Previously he was Chief of the Main Staff and First Deputy Commander-in-Chief of the Navy from 2024 to 2026.

Born into a family with a distinguished military past, Kasatonov studied at naval institutions in Leningrad and on the Black Sea, before joining the navy's Northern Fleet. Much of his early service was spent aboard the heavy nuclear missile cruiser Kirov, rising through the ranks to eventually serve as her assistant commander. During his time with the ship he served through search and rescue operations for two Soviet submarines, the K-219 in 1986 and the Komsomolets in 1989. After service with the 5th Operational Squadron and undertaking the navy's Higher Special Officer Classes, Kasatonov went on to take up his own commands, firstly the destroyer Gremyashchy, and then her sister ship Rastoropny. After further study at the Naval Academy, he was appointed head of the department of the mobilization at the Northern Fleet headquarters, before becoming captain of the battlecruiser Pyotr Velikiy in 2000.

It was during exercises in August 2000, led by the admiral aboard the Pyotr Velikiy, that the submarine K-141 Kursk suffered a fatal accident and sank. Kasatonov's ship was the first to locate the stricken submarine sixteen hours after her sinking and became the command ship for the recovery efforts. He continued in command of Pyotr Velikiy until 2005, having been promoted to rear-admiral during this period. He then took up staff positions with the Northern Fleet's missile ship division and carried out several long distance voyages with divisions of ships. He became chief of staff and first deputy commander of the Pacific Fleet in 2012, and in 2016 took up the position of head of the Naval Academy. This was followed by his posting in 2019 to be deputy commander in chief of the navy. He has received numerous medals over his career, as well as the Orders of Military Merit and Naval Merit. His life, as well as those of his relatives, is commemorated in a museum in Belenikhino, Belgorod Oblast.

== Family and early career ==
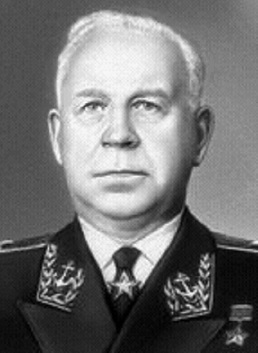
Vladimir Lvovich's grandfather, Admiral of the Fleet and Hero of the Soviet Union Vladimir Afanasyevich Kasatonov

Kasatonov was born in Moscow, part of the Russian SFSR in the Soviet Union on 17 June 1962. He was born into a military family with strong connections to the naval service. His great-grandfather Afanasy Stepanovich was a non-commissioned officer who received the Order of St. George while serving with the Uhlan Regiment of Her Imperial Majesty Empress Alexandra Feodorovna. Afanasy's son, and Vladimir Lvovich's grandfather, Vladimir Afanasyevich, served in the Soviet Navy, rose to the rank of admiral of the fleet, and was awarded Hero of the Soviet Union. Vladimir Afanasyevich's son, and Vladimir Lvovich's uncle, Igor Vladimirovich, reached the rank of admiral and commanded the Black Sea Fleet before serving as First Deputy Commander-in-Chief of the Navy.

Kasatonov entered the Nakhimov Naval School in Leningrad in 1977, and then from 1979 studied at the Nakhimov Black Sea Higher Naval School, graduating in 1984 with a gold medal. His active service began with the Northern Fleet, with the missile division of the armament section of the heavy nuclear missile cruiser Kirov. Over the next three years his group receiving ratings of 'excellent'. While serving aboard the Kirov in 1986, Kasatonov took part in the crew rescue operations for the submarine K-219, which had suffered a fire before sinking in the North Atlantic. In September 1987 he was appointed commander of the Kirov's missile division, and in February 1988 he was promoted to the rank of captain-lieutenant, one and a half years ahead of schedule. In September 1988 he was appointed assistant commander of the Kirov and in April 1989 participated in the rescue of the crew of the nuclear submarine Komsomolets, which sank in the Barents Sea after suffering a fire on board.

== First commands ==
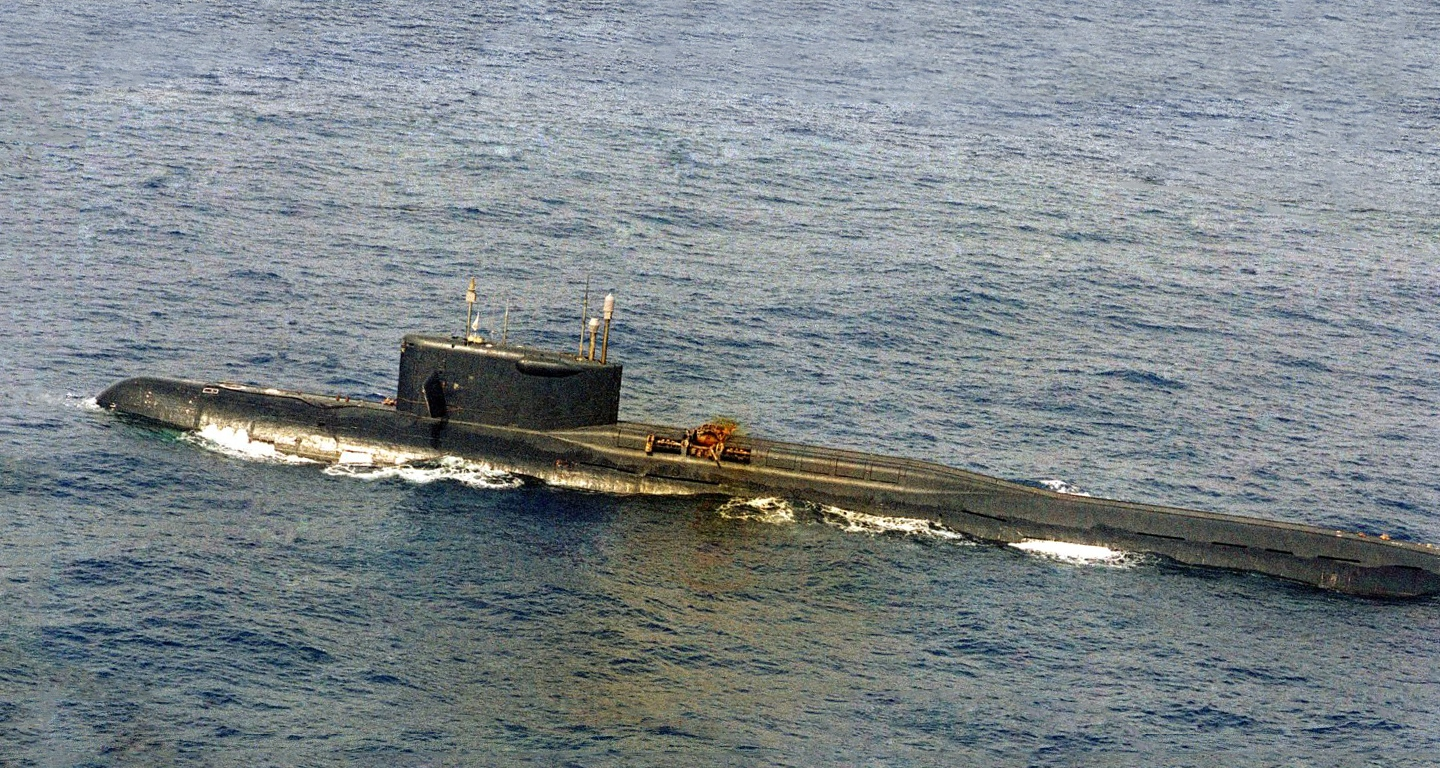
The damaged K-129 shortly before her sinking

Between 1990 and 1991 he served in the Mediterranean Sea with the 5th Operational Squadron and in July 1991 graduated from the Higher Special Officer Classes of the Navy and was appointed senior assistant commander of the Sovremenny-class destroyer Gremyashchy. In May 1993 he made a port visit to the United Kingdom aboard the Gremyashchy and from April 1994 was the senior assistant to the commander (executive officer) of the destroyer Rastoropny, becoming her commander in December 1994. He entered the Naval Academy in September 1997, graduating with honours in June 1999, and was appointed head of the department of mobilization at the Northern Fleet headquarters.

=== Pyotr Velikiy and Kursk ===
Between March 2000 to July 2005 Kasatonov was captain of the battlecruiser Pyotr Velikiy. It was during the Northern Fleet's annual exercises in the Barents Sea in August 2000 that the Oscar II-class submarine K-141 Kursk suffered a fatal accident and sank. The exercises, which began on 11 August, were the largest Russian naval exercises since the dissolution of the Soviet Union in 1991. More than thirty warships took part, overseen by the commander of the Northern Fleet, Admiral Vyacheslav Popov, with the Pyotr Velikiy as his flagship. On the morning of 12 August, the Kursk was scheduled to make a dummy torpedo attack on the Pyotr Velikiy. During preparations for the attack, the Kursk suffered an explosion and fire in her torpedo room, followed by a second larger explosion that sank her. Kasatonov's sonar operators aboard the Pyotr Velikiy reported the sounds of two explosions from the vicinity of the Kursk, and when the submarine failed to report in as scheduled, search operations began. At 4:30 AM local time, five hours after the search began, and sixteen hours after the submarine had sunk, Pyotr Velikiy's sonar detected the wreck of the Kursk lying at 108 metres (354 ft) some 65 miles (105 km) from Severomorsk. Rescue operations began, co-ordinated by Admiral Popov aboard the Pyotr Velikiy. By this time the survivors of the explosion were probably already dead. Kasatonov and the Pyotr Velikiy guarded the site of the wreck during rescue and then salvage efforts until October 2000.

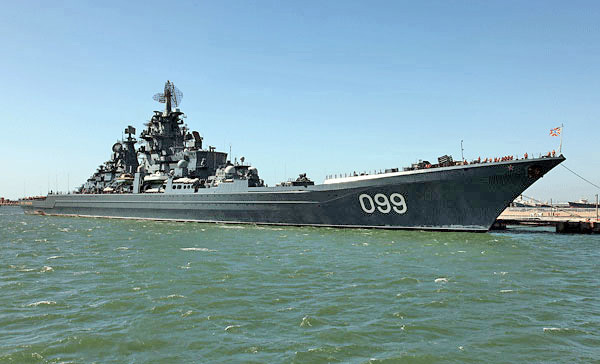
The battlecruiser Pyotr Velikiy, Kasatonov's command between 2000 and 2005

In October 2000, the Pyotr Velikiy was declared the best ship of the Northern Fleet. During an inspection visit by Defence Minister Sergei Ivanov in April 2002, Kasatonov was presented with a watch. Kasatonov was promoted to rear-admiral on 21 February 2003. In March 2004 Kasatonov was criticized for the condition of the Pyotr Velikiy by navy commander-in-chief Fleet Admiral Vladimir Kuroyedov. Kuroyedov, who ordered the Pyotr Velikiy to put into port, was quoted as saying "In those places on board where the admirals actually go, everything's fine, but where they don't go, everything's in such a state it could go sky high at any minute... And by that I also mean the state of the nuclear reactor." He later denied there was any threat from the nuclear reactor. Observers noted that the comments probably reflected in-fighting in the naval high command, where Kuroyedov was under pressure after a series of accidents, including the loss of the Kursk and the foundering of the K-159 in August 2003. They also noted that Kasatonov's uncle, Admiral Igor Kasatonov, had been highly critical of Kuroyedov over the loss of life when K-159 sank.

== Chief of Staff and flag commands ==
Between 2005 and 2006 he served as Chief of Staff of the Northern Fleet's 43rd missile ship division. He attended the Military Academy of the General Staff of the Armed Forces from September 2006, and in August 2008 was appointed commander of the Northern Fleet's 43rd missile ship division. In October 2008 he led a detachment of Northern Fleet warships on a cruise from the Arctic Ocean into the Atlantic, with port calls in Venezuela, and then into the Indian Ocean and the Mediterranean Sea.

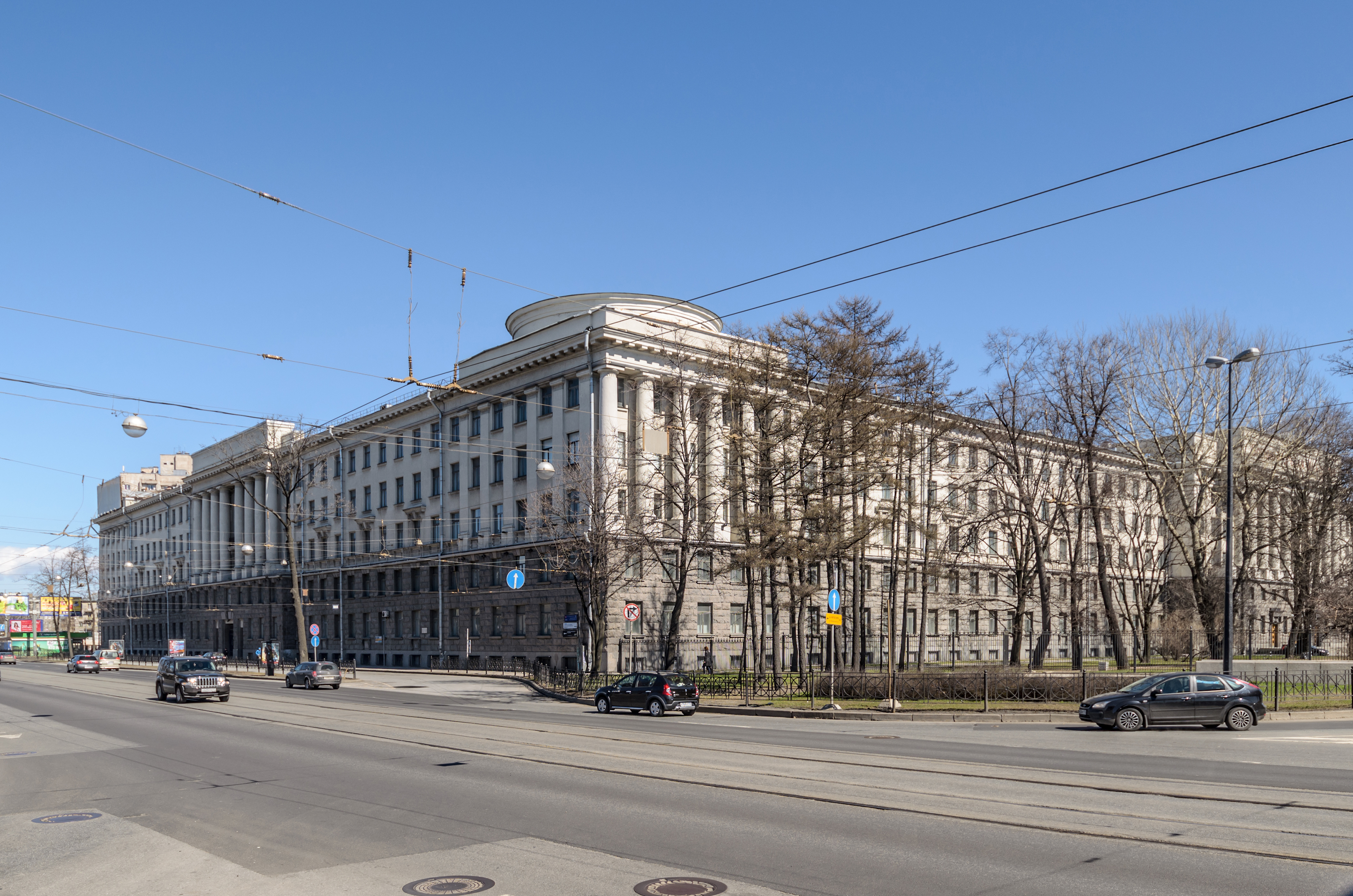
The N. G. Kuznetsov Naval Academy in Saint Petersburg. Kasatonov became head of the academy in 2016.

In April 2010 Kasatonov was appointed commander of the Kola Flotilla. In summer 2012 he commanded a detachment of ships from the Northern, Baltic and Black Sea Fleets, which operated in the Mediterranean Sea. On 14 September 2012 he was appointed chief of staff and first deputy commander of the Pacific Fleet. On 12 June 2013 he was promoted to vice-admiral. On 3 October 2016 he was appointed head of the Naval Academy, taking over in a ceremony attended by his predecessor, Vice-Admiral Aleksandr Nosatov, and the Chief of Staff of the Navy Andrei Volozhinsky. During the ceremony Volozhinsky described Kasatonov as "a true professional with a brilliant track record who has devoted many years to the service in the Northern and Pacific Fleets." On 20 December 2018 Kasatonov successfully defended his thesis for the award of the doctorate of military science. Present at the defence were his uncle, Admiral Igor Kasatonov, and Colonel-General (Naval aviation) Vladimir Deineka. In December 2019 Kasatonov was appointed deputy commander in chief of the navy. In June 2023 Kasatonov was promoted to Admiral.

== State Duma ==
In 2026, Kasatonov was elected to the State Duma, the lower house of the Russian parliament, on the list of the United Russia party. On 30 September 2026, during the first meeting of the 9th State Duma, Kasatonov was elected Chairman of the State Duma Committee on Defense.

== Sanctions ==
He was sanctioned by the UK government in 2022 in relation to the Russo-Ukrainian War.

In February 2022 Kasatonov was added to the European Union sanctions list for being "responsible for actively supporting and implementing actions and policies that undermine and threaten the territorial integrity, sovereignty and independence of Ukraine as well as the stability or security in Ukraine".

== Awards and honours ==
Over his career Kasatonov has been awarded the Orders of Military Merit, Naval Merit, and various medals of the USSR, Russian Federation, and foreign countries. In 2017 a museum to the Kasatonov family was opened in Belenikhino, Prokhorovsky District, in Belgorod Oblast, home of Vladimir Lvovich's great-grandfather Afanasy Stepanovich. Of the museum's five rooms, one is devoted to the three admirals Kasatonov: Vladimir Afanasyevich, Igor Vladimirovich, and Vladimir Lvovich.

Military offices
Preceded by Aleksandr Nosatov	Chief of the Main Staff and First Deputy Commander-in-Chief of the Russian Navy; 2024–2026	Succeeded by TBA
