= PD-50 =

Russian floating dry dock

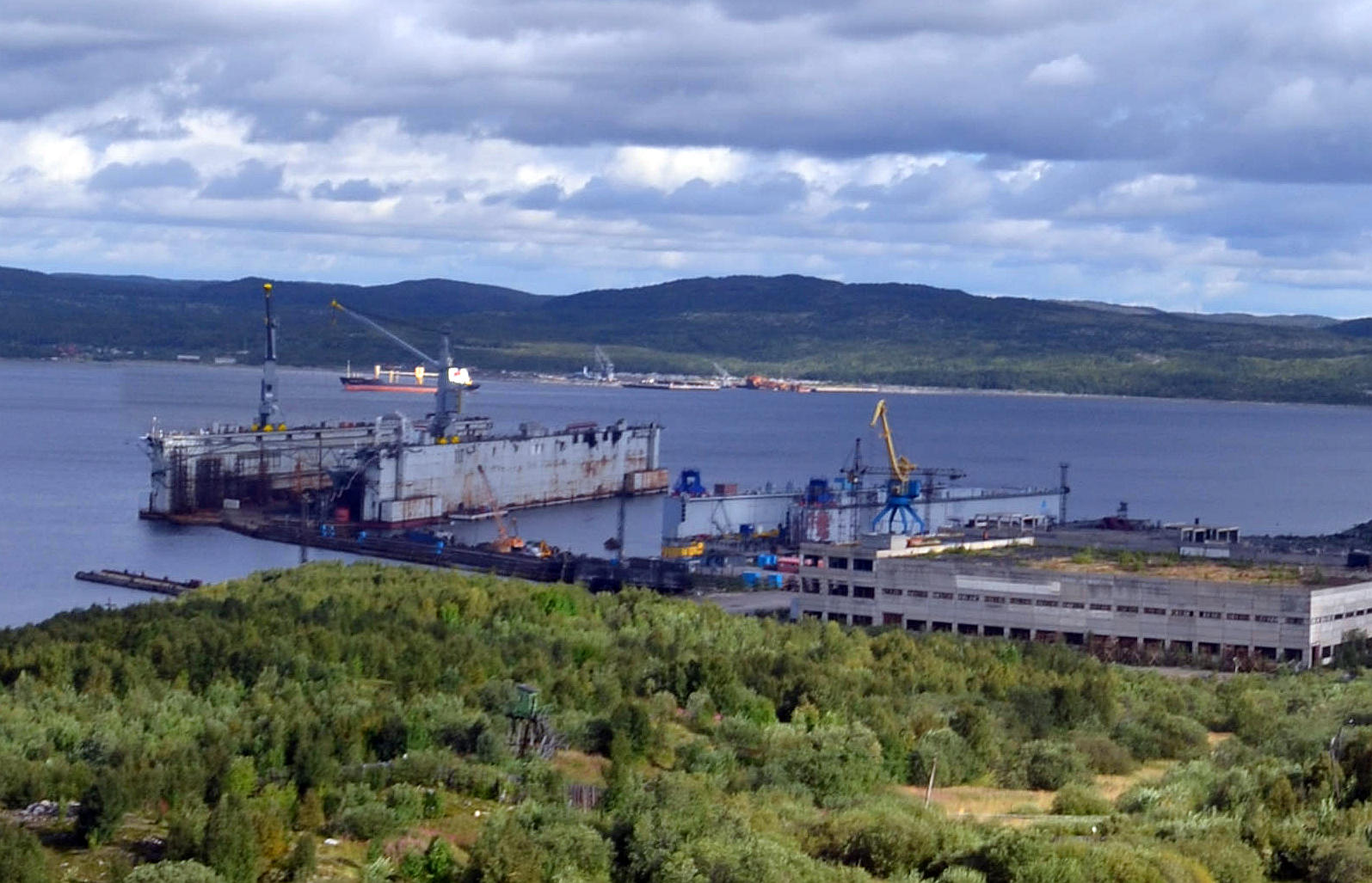
- PD-50 (left) in Roslyakovo, August 2016

History

Soviet Union, Russia
- Name: PD-50 (ПД-50)
- Owner: Shipyard No. 82 (Rosneft; 2013–)
- Ordered: March 1978
- Builder: Götaverken Arendal, Gothenburg, Sweden
- Yard number: 910
- Completed: August 1979 (planned); August 1980 (final)
- In service: 1980–2018
- Home port: Murmansk, Russia
- Fate: Sank on 30 October 2018

General characteristics
- Type: Floating dry dock
- Tonnage: 181,230 DWT
- Displacement: 135,460 tonnes (standard); 215,860 tonnes (full load)
- Length: 330 m (1,082 ft 8 in)
- Beam: 88 m (288 ft 9 in)
- Draught: 6.116 m (20 ft 0.8 in)
- Propulsion: None
- Capacity: 80,000 tonnes
- Crew: 175

PD-50 (Russian: ПД-50), Soviet designation Project 7454, was a Russian large floating dry dock built at the Götaverken Arendal shipyard in Gothenburg, Sweden and commissioned in the 1980s. At the time, it was the world's largest floating dry dock and used primarily to service the ships and submarines of the Northern Fleet.

The 330-metre-long (1,082 ft 8 in) and 79-metre-wide (259 ft 2 in) floating dock was owned by Shipyard No. 82 and stationed at Roslyakovo, near Murmansk. In November 2018, the dock sank after a power outage while holding the aircraft carrier/aircraft cruiser Admiral Kuznetsov.

== History ==
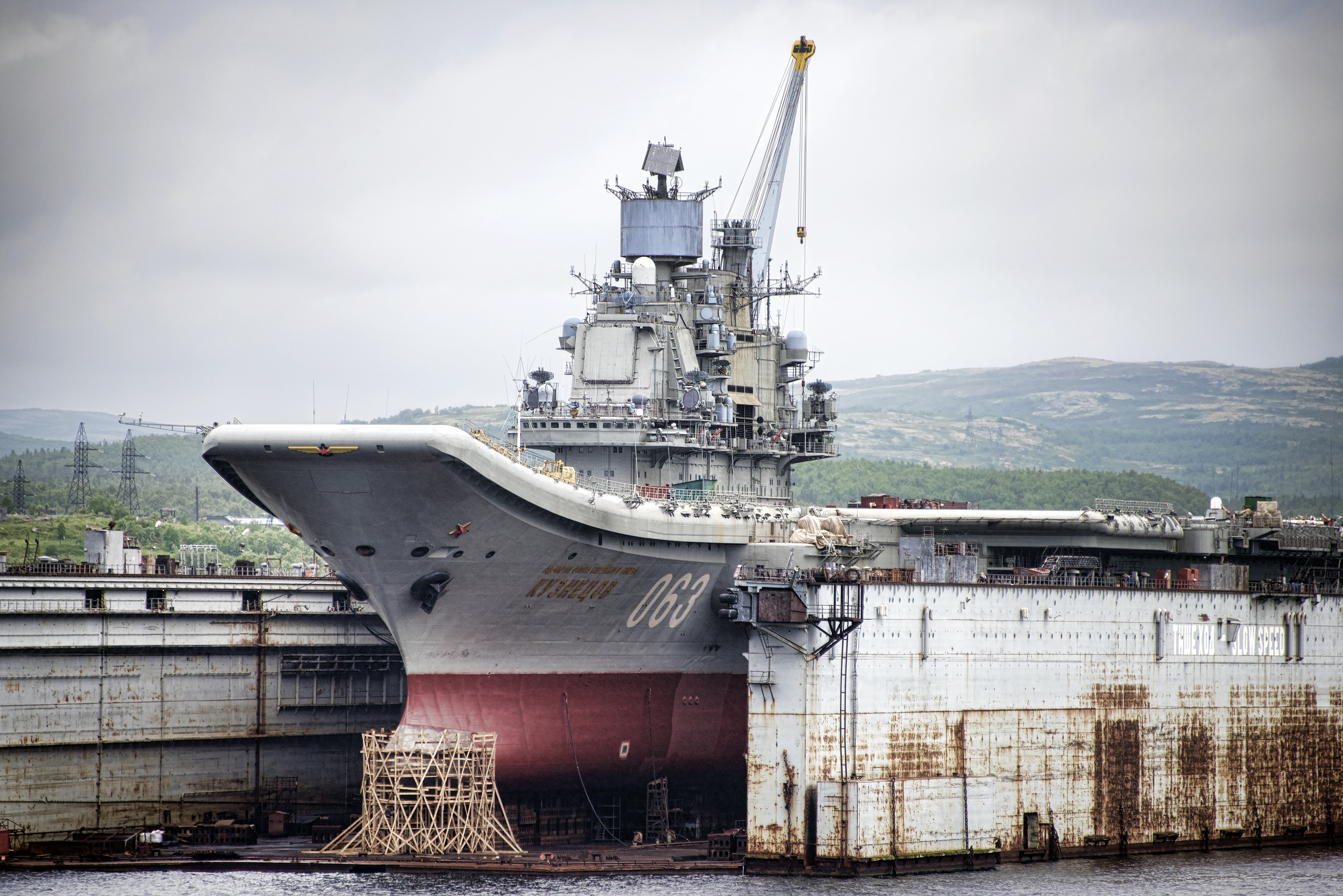
Admiral Kuznetsov dry-docked in PD-50, June 2015

In March 1978, Götaverken Arendal shipyard in Gothenburg, Sweden was awarded a contract for the construction of the world's largest floating dry dock for the Soviet Union. While the company had previously built mainly oil tankers and bulk carriers, it was struggling for new orders after demand for one of its main products had dwindled following the 1973 oil crisis, and bidding for the dry dock was one of the shipyard's attempts to diversify its portfolio. With an agreed-upon delivery time of 18 months from the date of contract signing, the work was split between two shipyards in order to speed up construction: Götaverken Arendal built five of the seven sections while the nearby Eriksbergs Mekaniska Verkstad supplied the remaining two; the sections were joined together afloat using underwater welding. The floating dock was named PD-50 (Russian: ПД-50); "PD" being short for "Plavuchiy Dok" (Russian: Плавучий док, lit. 'floating dock').

In August 1979, the nearly-finished PD-50 was towed to open sea for trials. During the final test, which involved finding out how fast the submerged dock could be deballasted, two ballast water tanks partially collapsed due to underpressure. The floating dry dock was hastily towed back to Arendal with visible denting on the shell plating and the shipyard workers scrambled to fix the damage. The repairs were completed in early September, and PD-50 was handed over to the customer.

On 22 September 1979, PD-50 began its delivery voyage to Murmansk under tow by two Dutch tugboats, Smit Rotterdam and Smit London. On 3 October, after sailing around the Norwegian coast, the floating dry dock broke free in a storm and was blown ashore on the Soviet side of the Norwegian border. The grounding of the brightly-illuminated PD-50 was witnessed by Soviet border guards who later described the incident as if a small city had appeared from the sea, only to be driven on the rocks by the storm.

While damage to the grounded dry dock was extensive, PD-50 was deemed repairable. After refloating, it was towed first to Kirkenes, Norway and later to a Norwegian shipyard in Stord. The repairs included lifting PD-50 fully out of the water using pontoons and replacing 4,000 tonnes of steel. In September 1980, one year after the grounding, PD-50 finally reached Murmansk.

On 29 December 2011, the Russian Delta IV-class nuclear submarine Ekaterinburg (K-84) caught fire while being docked in PD-50. The fire was extinguished by partially submerging PD-50 twice with the K-84 on top.

In 2013, Russian oil company Rosneft took over Shipyard No. 82 and its assets, including PD-50, in preparation for turning the old naval shipyard into a base for the company's Arctic operations. This caused outrage in naval circles, as the shipyard was one of the few in Russia with facilities capable of docking the country's largest surface vessels.

On 30 October 2018, the Russian aircraft carrier Admiral Kuznetsov was damaged when PD-50 suddenly sank under it, causing one of the dock's 70-ton cranes to crash onto the ship's flight deck. One shipyard worker went missing and four others required medical attention, one of whom later died at the hospital.

== Replacement ==
In July 2019, Zvezdochka Ship Repair Center JSC and Saint Petersburg company Investments Engineering Construction (I.I.S.) signed a contract for reconstruction and modernization of Shipyard No. 35 in Murmansk. As part of the RUB20 billion (US$311.5 million) deal, two adjacent dry docks at the plant will be merged into a single dock by demolishing a partition between them. Walls, slipways and other dock equipment will be modernized. After the modernization, it will be the largest dry dock in Russia, capable of docking Russia's sole aircraft carrier Admiral Kuznetsov, as well as other of Russia's largest vessels, such as the battlecruiser Pyotr Velikiy. As of December 2019, work on reconstruction of the shipyard was underway.
