= Minkino, Murmansk Oblast =

Minkino Минькино
- Selo
- Interactive map of Minkino
- Location of Minkino Minkino (Murmansk Oblast)
- Coordinates: 69°00′16″N 33°00′24″E
- Country: Russia
- Federal subject: Murmansk Oblast
- Administrative district: Kolsky District
- Territorial okrugSelsoviet: Mezhdurechensky Territorial Okrug

Population (2010 Census)
  - Total: 433
  - Estimate (2021): 293 (−32.3%)

Municipal status
  - Municipal district: Kolsky Municipal District
  - Rural settlement: Mezhdurechye Rural Settlement
- Time zone: UTC+3 (MSK)
- Postal code: 184376
- Dialing code: +7 81553
- OKTMO ID: 47605402106

Minkino (Russian: Минькино) is a rural locality (a selo) in Kolsky District of Murmansk Oblast, Russia, located beyond the Arctic Circle at a height of 1 meter (3 ft 3 in) above sea level. Population: 433 (2010 Census).

== History ==
It was in the past also known as the colony of Menkin Ruchey (Менькин Ручей). On December 9, 1920, it became the administrative center of Minkinsky Selsoviet of Alexandrovskaya Volost in Arkhangelsk Governorate of the Russian SFSR. While the selsoviet underwent territorial changes and changed administrative jurisdiction on multiple occasions in the years that followed, Minkino remained its administrative center until 1982.
