= Roslyakovo, Murmansk Oblast =

Urban locality in Murmansk Oblast, Russia

Roslyakovo Росляково
- Urban-type settlement (abolished)
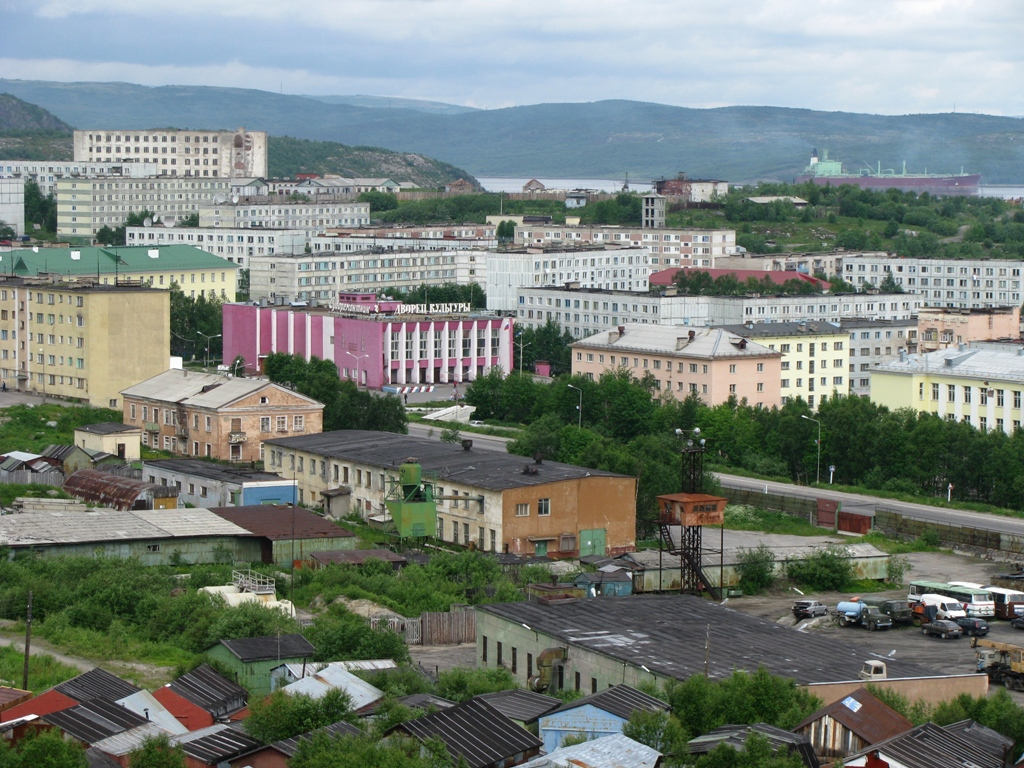
- View of Roslyakovo

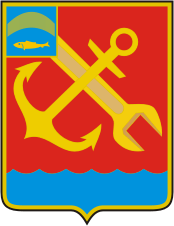
- Coat of arms
- Interactive map of Roslyakovo
- Location of Roslyakovo Roslyakovo (Murmansk Oblast)
- Coordinates: 69°02′46″N 33°12′40″E
- Country: Russia
- Federal subject: Murmansk Oblast
- Founded: 1896
- Urban-type settlement status since: 1959
- Abolished: January 1, 2015

Population (2010 Census)
  - Total: 8,696
  - Estimate (2014): 8,928 (+2.7%)

Administrative status
  - Subordinated to: closed administrative-territorial formation of Severomorsk

Municipal status
  - Urban okrug: Severomorsk Urban Okrug
- Time zone: UTC+3 (MSK)
- Postal code: 184635
- Dialing code: +7 81537
- OKTMO ID: 47730000056

Roslyakovo (Russian: Росляко́во) was an urban locality (an urban-type settlement) under the administrative jurisdiction of the closed-administrative territorial formation of Severomorsk in Murmansk Oblast, Russia, located on the Kola Peninsula on the Kola Bay, 6 kilometers (3.7 mi) west of Severomorsk proper. It was abolished, with its territory merged into the city of Murmansk, on January 1, 2015. Population: 8,696 (2010 census); 9,458 (2002 census); 11,981 (1989 Soviet census).

== History ==
It was founded in 1896. The colony of Roslyakovo was one of the twenty-one included into Alexandrovskaya Volost of Alexandrovsky Uyezd, Arkhangelsk Governorate upon its establishment on July 1, 1920. Urban-type settlement status was granted to Roslyakovo in 1959.

Roslyakovo was in jurisdiction of the closed administrative-territorial formation of Severomorsk until January 1, 2015, when it was abolished, with its territory merged into the city of Murmansk.

There is no restaurant or cafe in town. Formerly, there was a medical clinic. There are "a few 7-Eleven-sized grocery stores." The Church of St. Michael the Archangel, founded in 1991, is the only church in the town.

Most of the population are in the Russian Navy, or work as navy contractors. Shipbuilding is a local industry. After merging and enlarging two graving docks for the aircraft carrier Admiral Kuznetsov, Roslyakovo has the largest drydock in European Russia. Rosneft, the state owned oil company, is opening facilities in the town.

== Citations ==
- Official website of Murmansk Oblast. Registry of the Administrative-Territorial Structure of Murmansk Oblast (in Russian)
- Архивный отдел Администрации Мурманской области. Государственный Архив Мурманской области (1995). Административно-территориальное деление Мурманской области (1920—1993 гг.). Справочник. Мурманск: Мурманское издательско-полиграфическое предприятие "Север".
- Мурманская областная Дума. Закон №1812-01-ЗМО от 19 декабря 2014 г. «Об упразднении населённого пункта Мурманской области и о внесении изменений в отдельные законодательные акты Мурманской области». Вступил в силу 1 января 2015 г. Опубликован: «Мурманский Вестник», №246–247, с. 56, 25 декабря 2014 г. (Murmansk Oblast Duma. Law #1812-01-ZMO of December 19, 2014 On Abolishing an Inhabited Locality in Murmansk Oblast and on Amending Various Legislative Acts of Murmansk Oblast. Effective as of January 1, 2015.).
- Президент Российской Федерации. Указ №603 от 1 сентября 2014 г. «О преобразовании закрытого административно-территориального образования — города Североморска Мурманской области». Вступил в силу со дня подписания. Опубликован: Официальный интернет-портал правовой информации http://www.pravo.gov.ru, 2 сентября 2014 г. (President of the Russian Federation. Decree #603 of September 1, 2014 On the Transformation of the Closed Administrative-Territorial Formation—the Town of Severomorsk in Murmansk Oblast. Effective as of the date of signing.).
