= Stability 2008 =

Russian military exercise

"Stability 2008" was a major strategic military exercise initiated in late September 2008 involving the Russian military estimated to last for around one month. The exercise was a rehearsal of the deployment of Russia's conventional armed forces, and also its ground-, sea- and air-based nuclear deterrent. Russia carried out four ballistic missile launches in less than 24 hours, It included two from nuclear submarines (in the Sea of Okhotsk and the Barents Sea), a Topol missile from the Plesetsk base, and a Sineva intercontinental ballistic missile that traveled 11,500 kilometers toward the pacific Ocean.

The exercises involved mobilization and deployment to forward positions of forces in the Moscow and Far East Military Districts and the deployment of the navy in the North Sea, the Atlantic (Northern Fleet), the Baltic Sea (Baltic Fleet), and the Pacific (Pacific Fleet). Three air armies and one air defense corps, the Strategic Rocket Forces, strategic bombers, and Space Forces were involved as well as Belarusian military formations. The exercise involved all of Russia's nuclear forces, most of the battle-ready navy, and the Air Force, but only some of the army. Tupolev Tu-22M3; Tupolev Tu-95MS; and Tupolev Tu-160 strategic bombers, Sukhoi Su-27 fighters, Mikoyan MiG-31 interceptors, Ilyushin Il-78 tankers, and Beriev A-50 AWACS took part in the exercise. On October 8, Japanese F-15s intercepted Russian Tupolev Tu-22M3s over the Sea of Japan.

As part of the exercise, two Tupolev Tu-160 strategic bombers were deployed to Venezuela.

Russian embedded journalists were on board the nuclear cruiser Pyotr Velikii which was underway to the Syrian port of Tartus, broadcasting daily bulletins from the exercise to Russian broadcast audiences. Several Russian warships stopped in the Libyan port of Tripoli for three days on their way to Venezuela. The Pyotr Velikii was destined for Venezuela where it took part in naval exercises.

== See also ==
- Able Archer 83
