= Russian destroyer Gremyashchy (1987) =

Sovremenny-class destroyer of the Russian Navy

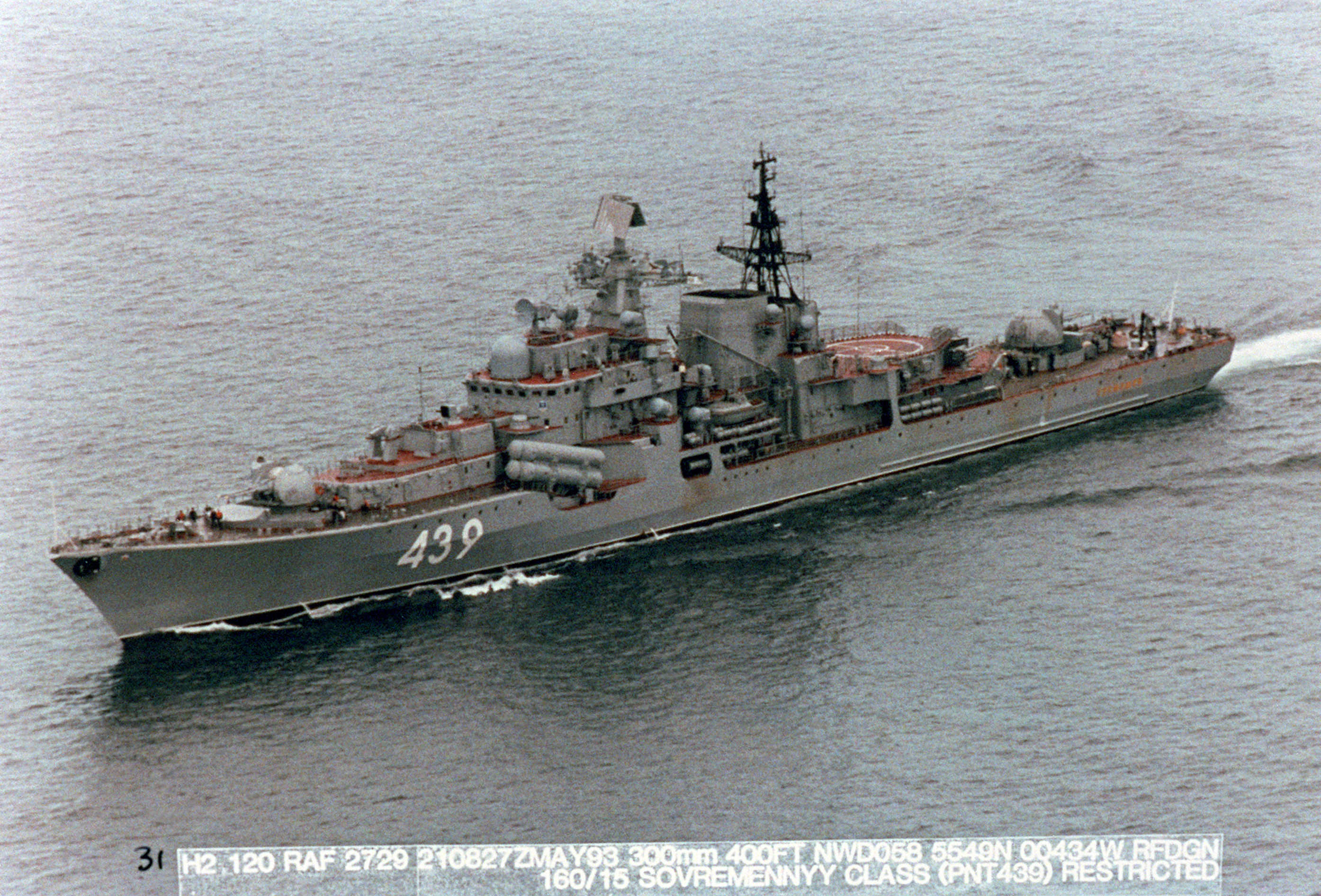
- Gremyashchy underway on 1 June 1993

History

Soviet Union → Russia
- Name: Veduschy; (Ведущий / Leading)
- Renamed: Gremyashchy; (Гремящий / Thundering)
- Builder: Zhdanov Shipyard, Leningrad
- Laid down: 23 November 1984
- Launched: 30 May 1987
- Commissioned: 30 December 1988
- Decommissioned: 2007
- Home port: Kaliningrad
- Identification: Pennant number: 420, 429, 439, 680
- Status: Undergoing scrap

General characteristics
- Class & type: Sovremenny-class destroyer
- Displacement: 6,600 tons standard, 8,480 tons full load
- Length: 156 m (511 ft 10 in)
- Beam: 17.3 m (56 ft 9 in)
- Draught: 6.5 m (21 ft 4 in)
- Propulsion: 2 shaft steam turbines, 4 boilers, 75,000 kW (100,000 hp), 2 fixed propellers, 2 turbo generators, and 2 diesel generators
- Speed: 32.7 knots (60.6 km/h; 37.6 mph)
- Range: 3,920 nmi (7,260 km; 4,510 mi) at 18 knots (33 km/h; 21 mph); 1,345 nmi (2,491 km; 1,548 mi) at 33 knots (61 km/h; 38 mph)
- Complement: 350
- Sensors & processing systems: Radar: Air target acquisition radar, 3 × navigation radars, 130 mm gun fire-control radars, 30 mm air-defence gun fire control radar; Sonar: Active and passive under-keel sonar; ES: Tactical situation plotting board, anti-ship missile fire control system, air defence, missile fire-control system, and torpedo fire control system
- Electronic warfare & decoys: 2 PK-2 decoy dispensers (200 rockets)
- Armament: Guns: 4 (2 × 2) AK-130 130 mm naval guns; 4 × 30 mm AK-630 CIWS; Missiles; 8 (2 × 4) (SS-N-22 'Sunburn') anti-ship missiles; 48 (2 × 24) SA-N-7 'Gadfly' surface-to-air missiles; Anti-submarine: 2 × 2 533 mm torpedo tubes; 2 × 6 RBU-1000 300 mm anti-submarine rocket launchers
- Aircraft carried: 1× Ka-27 series helicopter
- Aviation facilities: Helipad

Gremyashchy was a Sovremenny-class destroyer of the Soviet and later Russian navy. Previously her name was Veduschy, which was renamed shortly before commissioning.

== Development and design ==
The project began in the late 1960s when it was becoming obvious to the Soviet Navy that naval guns still had an important role particularly in support of amphibious landings, but existing gun cruisers and destroyers were showing their age. A new design was started, employing a new 130 mm automatic gun turret.

The ships were 156 metres (512 ft) in length, with a beam of 17.3 metres (56 ft 9 in) and a draught of 6.5 metres (21 ft 4 in).

== Construction and career ==
Veduschy was laid down on 23 November 1984 and launched on 30 May 1987 by Zhdanov Shipyard in Leningrad. Before being commissioned on 30 December 1988, she was renamed Gremyashchy on 14 November 1988.

From April 23 to October 27, 1994, she underwent routine repairs at the shipyard No. 35 in Rost (boiler tubes were replaced).

On January 12, 1995, she was placed in PD-50 at the shipyard No. 82 in Roslyakovo to perform dock work. Docking was completed on March 11 of the same year. From March 1995 to January 1996, the ship performed combat training tasks and was awarded the Diploma of the President of Russia for participation in the jubilee parade dedicated to the 50th anniversary of Victory in the Great Patriotic War.

In September 1996, due to the unsatisfactory condition of three of the four boilers (1st, 2nd and 4th), the destroyer was prohibited from going to sea. She was withdrawn from the forces of constant combat readiness on March 28, 1997 and was transferred to the 2nd category reserve.

The ship's repair terms expired in December 1997.

On February 16, 1998 she was transferred to the 43rd division of missile ships of the 7th operational squadron until her decommissioning in 2007.

In April 2016, the Russian Ministry of Defence officially requested bids for a contract for the scrapping of Gremyashchy along with seven other naval vessels.

In May 2019, a fire broke out on the destroyer stationed in Severomorsk.
