= Russian battlecruiser Pyotr Velikiy =

Kirov-class battlecruiser

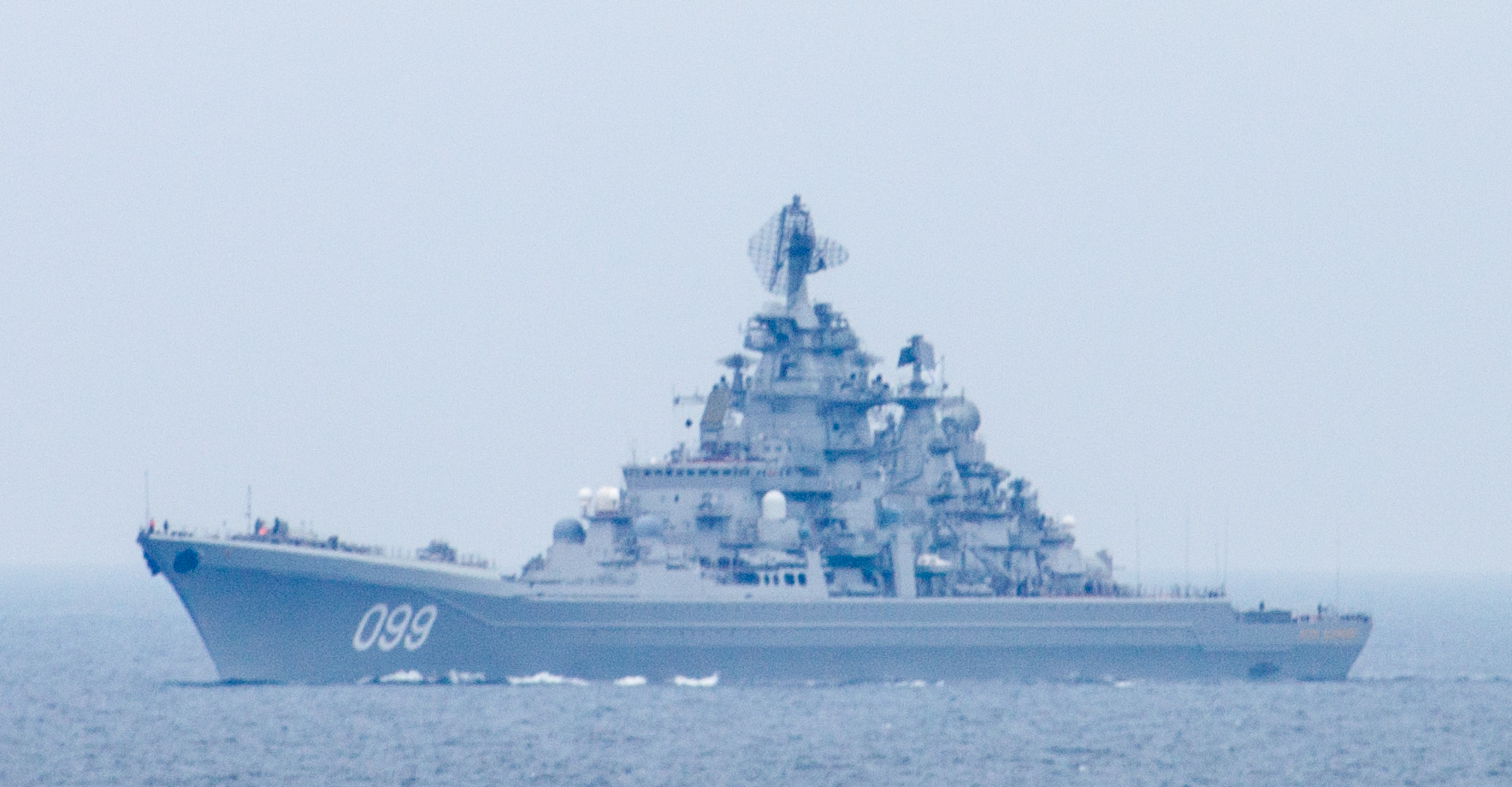
- Pyotr Velikiy in 2017

History

→ Soviet Union → Russia
- Name: Yuri Andropov → Pyotr Velikiy (since 1992)
- Namesake: Yuri Andropov → Peter the Great
- Laid down: 24 April 1986
- Launched: 29 April 1989
- Commissioned: 18 April 1998
- Identification: Pennant number: 183 → 099
- Status: Laid-up
- Notes: Flagship of the Northern Fleet

General characteristics
- Class & type: Kirov-class battlecruiser
- Displacement: 24,000 t (24,000 long tons) standard; 26,000 t (26,000 long tons) fully loaded
- Length: 251.1 m (823 ft 10 in)
- Beam: 28.5 m (93 ft 6 in)
- Draft: 10.3 m (33 ft 10 in)
- Installed power: 2 × nuclear reactors; 2 × boilers
- Propulsion: 2 × steam turbines; 2 × shafts
- Speed: 31 kn (57 km/h; 36 mph) (CONAS); 25 kn (46 km/h; 29 mph) (nuclear only)
- Range: Unlimited
- Complement: 710 officers and sailors
- Armament: 20 × P-700 Granit anti-ship missile launchers; 12 × S-300 Fort-M surface-to-air missile launchers (total 96 missiles); 16 × 3K95 Kinzhal surface-to-air missile launchers (total 128 missiles); 6 × Kortik close-in weapon systems; 1 × 130 mm (5 in) AK-130 dual-purpose gun; 10 × 533 mm (21 in) torpedo tubes; 2 × RBU-1200 anti-submarine rocket launchers; 1 × RBU-1000 anti-submarine rocket launcher
- Aircraft carried: 3 × Kamov Ka-27 helicopters

Pyotr Velikiy (Russian: Пётр Великий, lit. 'Peter the Great') is the fourth Project 1144 Orlan (NATO reporting name Kirov-class) battlecruiser of the Russian Navy. It was initially named Yuri Andropov (Russian: Юрий Андропов) after the former General Secretary of the Communist Party Yuri Andropov, but the name was changed following the dissolution of the Soviet Union. The Russian designation for the type is "heavy nuclear-powered guided missile cruiser", but Western defense commentators have resurrected the term "battlecruiser" to describe them, as they are the largest surface combatant warships in the world. Pyotr Velikiy has been the flagship of the Northern Fleet since it entered service.

The Kirov-class battlecruisers were developed to counter NATO submarines and carrier strike groups. Pyotr Velikiy has a large armament that includes P-700 Granit anti-ship missiles, S-300 Fort-M surface-to-air missiles, 3K95 Kinzhal surface-to-air missiles, and several anti-submarine missile launchers. It also has a helicopter landing pad and under-deck facilities to store three Kamov Ka-27 helicopters. To enable the ship to reach a high speed of over 30 knots, it is equipped with a combined nuclear and steam system, with each of its two steam turbines being connected to a nuclear reactor and an oil-fired boiler that provides additional power.

Construction of the ship was delayed by lack of funding due to the national economic problems before and after the fall of the Soviet Union. As Yuri Andropov, the ship was laid down on 24 April 1986 at the Baltic Shipyard in Leningrad and launched on 29 April 1989. In May 1992 Yuri Andropov was renamed Pyotr Velikiy (Russian for Peter the Great) but the vessel was not completed and commissioned until 18 April 1998, twelve years after work had started. It has been known to carry two pennant numbers during its service: "183" and currently "099". Since entering service, Pyotr Velikiy has taken part in actions against piracy off the coast of Somalia and in support of the Russian intervention in the Syrian civil war. In 2017 it was present at the first Navy Day Main Naval Parade in Saint Petersburg. Since 2022 it has been laid-up in Severodvinsk.

== Design ==
The Project 1144 Orlan (Russian: Орла́н, lit. 'sea eagle', NATO reporting name Kirov-class) nuclear-powered guided missile cruiser began to be developed in 1968 for the purpose of hunting enemy submarines. The Northern Design Bureau initially planned for it to be much smaller, displacing no more than 8,000–9,000 tons, but this was rejected by the commander-in-chief of the Soviet Navy, Admiral of the Fleet of the Soviet Union Sergey Gorshkov. In 1971 it was decided that it should include additional weapon systems, requiring a larger design. The Project 1144 cruiser intended primarily for anti-submarine warfare was merged with the Project 1165, which would have carried anti-ship missiles. To accommodate anti-submarine, anti-ship, and anti-air missiles, the Kirov class has a standard displacement of 24,000 tons and a displacement of 28,000 tons when fully loaded. For Pyotr Velikiy the latter has been reported as 26,000 tons. This makes the Kirovs the largest surface warships to have been built since World War II besides aircraft carriers. Being larger than any Western cruiser, it is often described as a battlecruiser.

Pyotr Velikiy has a top speed of 31 kn (57 km/h; 36 mph). For such a large ship to achieve that speed, the Kirov-class battlecruiser is equipped with a combined nuclear and steam system (CONAS) that provides 140,000 horsepower (100,000 kW) to its two propeller shafts. Both of its two steam turbines are connected to a KN-3 nuclear reactor and an oil-fired boiler, the latter providing additional power for the vessel to be able to reach its maximum speed. The alternative, having four to six nuclear reactors, was rejected by the designers as being too dangerous. It has a virtually unlimited range at lower speeds, and a top speed of 25 kn (46 km/h; 29 mph), while on nuclear power, but its range at 31 knots is limited by fuel. The Kirovs have a length of 251.1 metres (823 ft 10 in), a beam of 59 metres (193 ft 7 in), and a draft of 10.3 metres (33 ft 10 in). The crew consists of 710, and the accommodations include a swimming pool, a gym, a sauna, a lounge with billiard tables and a piano, and a television studio. A two-level medical block includes isolation wards, dental rooms, an operating room, and a pharmacy. Officers and warrant officers have about 150 single or double cabins while the petty officers and enlisted sailors have 30 quarters for 8-30 people each.

The Kirov class was described by the U.S. intelligence community in the 1980s as having "an array of weapons that makes it one of the most powerfully armed surface warships in the world." The current armament of Pyotr Velikiy includes 20 P-700 Granit anti-ship missile launchers, each holding one missile; 12 S-300 Fort-M surface-to-air missile launchers with eight missiles each, for 96 in total; 16 3K95 Kinzhal surface-to-air missile launchers with eight missiles each, for 128 in total; six Kortik close-in weapon systems with up to 192 9M311 surface-to-air missiles in storage; one twin 130 mm (5 in) AK-130 dual-purpose gun with up to 840 shells in storage; ten 533 mm (21 in) torpedo tubes that can fire regular torpedoes or RPK-6M anti-submarine missiles; and one RBU-1000 and two RBU-1200 rocket launchers with up to 120 rocket-propelled depth charges. Its electronic sensors allow it to detect targets 300 km (190 mi) away, or up to 30 km (19 mi) above it. The ship also has a helicopter landing pad and an under-deck hangar, for up to three Kamov Ka-27 helicopters. Its armament enables it to counter NATO submarines as well as carrier strike groups, and having S-300FM missiles makes Pyotr Velikiy the only ship in the Russian Navy capable of defending against ballistic missiles.

== Service history ==
=== Construction and early service ===
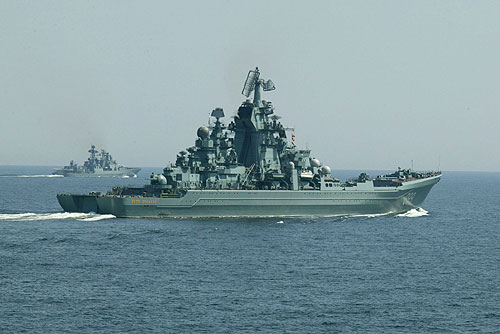
Pyotr Velikiy during Northern and Baltic Fleet tactical exercises in 2003

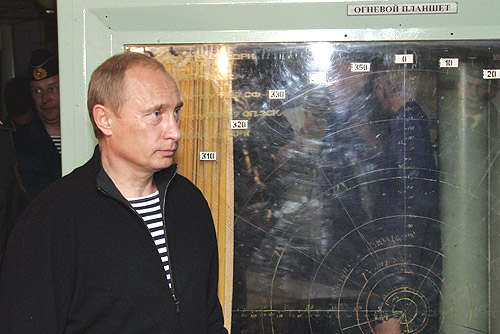
President Vladimir Putin visiting Pyotr Velikiy in 2005

Yuri Andropov was laid down on 24 April 1986 at the Baltic Shipyard in Leningrad and launched on 29 April 1989. In May 1992 all four Kirov-class ships were renamed, and Yuri Andropov became Pyotr Velikiy, after Peter the Great. Work on Pyotr Velikiy delayed after the dissolution of the Soviet Union (a fifth ship was laid down in 1989 but it was later cancelled and scrapped). In February 1993 it was announced that Pyotr Velikiy will be completed, and work resumed in August. At that time two other Kirov-class ships were inactive due to reactor problems, and Admiral Nakhimov was the only battlecruiser in service. After completing its sea trials, Pyotr Velikiy was transferred to the Northern Fleet at Severomorsk on 24 November 1996, and underwent further tests in 1997. It was commissioned into the Russian Navy on 18 April 1998. In August 1998 Russian president Boris Yeltsin observed a naval exercise from aboard the cruiser, which became the flagship of the Northern Fleet.

Starting on 10 August 2000, Pyotr Velikiy was in the Barents Sea to oversee the a large training exercise involving thirty ships and submarines. The battlecruiser was to be the designated target of a practice torpedo attack by the Oscar-class submarine Kursk, and was conducting evasive maneuvers when communication with Kursk was lost on 12 August. The submarine was later found to have suffered catastrophic torpedo detonations, resulting in the loss of all 118 crew members. Pyotr Velikiy was the first to locate the submarine with its acoustic equipment, and served as the command ship during the subsequent recovery operation in the fall of 2000. It patrolled the area around the submarine during the salvaging in August 2001.

In March 2004, the commander-in-chief of the Russian Navy, Admiral of the Fleet Vladimir Kuroyedov, was reported to have said that Pyotr Velikiy was unfit for service due to problems with the ship's maintenance, especially its nuclear reactor. He denied the statement within hours, and it was reported that he had made the remark because of a conflict with Admiral Igor Kasatonov, whose nephew, Vladimir Kasatonov, was the captain of Pyotr Velikiy at the time. In April 2004, the cruiser was docked in the floating drydock PD-50 for painting of the underside of the hull, repairs, and examination of the steering system. The repairs were completed later that year, and she was carrying out missions again by August. From September 21 to October 22, 2004 she sailed on her first long voyage. Accompanying the aircraft carrier Admiral Kuznetsov, the destroyers Admiral Chabanenko and Admiral Ushakov, as well as several auxiliary ships, she went into the north-western Atlantic in what was the largest Russian naval exercise after the end of the Cold War.

=== 2008–2009 cruise ===
On 8 September 2008, it was announced that Pyotr Velikiy would sail to the Caribbean Sea to participate in naval exercises with the Venezuelan Navy, along with the destroyer Admiral Chabanenko and other support ships. This action would represent the first major Russian show of force in the Caribbean since the end of the Cold War. On 22 September Pyotr Velikiy and Admiral Chabanenko left their homeport of Severomorsk. On 22 October, Pyotr Velikiy made a port visit to Aksaz Karagac, Turkey and on 6–9 November the cruiser and Admiral Chabanenko made a port visit to Toulon, France, before departing the Mediterranean on 10 November, passing through the Strait of Gibraltar. Pyotr Velikiy arrived in La Guaira, Venezuela on 25 November, coinciding with a visit by Russian president Dmitry Medvedev. A combined exercise, VENRUS-200, with the Venezuelan Navy took place on 1–2 December 2008.

After finishing the exercises, Admiral Chabanenko made a short visit to Panama 5–10 December, then to Bluefields, Nicaragua from 13 to 15 December and sailed into Havana, Cuba on 19 December. Pyotr Velikiy continued alone to Cape Town, South Africa. On 11 January 2009, the chief of the Russian General Staff announced that Pyotr Velikiy and six other Russian warships would participate in a joint naval exercise with the Indian Navy later the same month. The Kirov-class cruiser paused for three days to visit Cape Town before continuing on to India. On 31 January Pyotr Velikiy left the port of Mormugao in the Indian state of Goa. After a two-day visit that included a naval exercise with the Indian guided-missile destroyer INS Delhi the cruiser left for African waters where the vessel joined other warships from the Russian navy and conduct the INDRA-2009 exercise. On 12 February, the ship captured ten pirates in three boats off the coast of Somalia. On 10 March, Pyotr Velikiy returned to her homeport of Severomorsk, ending a six-month deployment.

=== 2010s ===
On 30 March 2010, Pyotr Velikiy left the Northern Fleet for a new six-month deployment. During her six-month tour of duty, the warship passed through the Atlantic Ocean and the Mediterranean Sea before entering the Indian Ocean via the Suez Canal. In the Indian Ocean the cruiser conducted maneuvers with other Russian warships from the Black Sea Fleet. On 14 April the missile cruiser visited the Mediterranean port of Tartus in Syria. In early May, Pyotr Velikiy met up with the cruiser Moskva in the South China Sea. There they conducted joint exercises and held a traditional farewell ceremony on 5 May. The two vessels were due to arrive in Russia's Far Eastern port of Vladivostok to take part in the Vostok-2010 large-scale strategic exercise. On 29 September Pyotr Velikiy returned to her home base in the Northern Fleet after six months at sea. The flagship of the Northern Fleet had covered about 28,000 nautical miles (52,000 km; 32,000 mi) since the beginning of the mission on 30 March.

On 28 July 2012, Russian president Vladimir Putin awarded Pyotr Velikiy the Order of Nakhimov "for the courage, selflessness and high level of professionalism demonstrated by the ship's personnel in performing combat task orders issued by naval command." During early September 2013 Pyotr Velikiy led a flotilla of Russian Navy ships through the Russian portion of the Northern Sea Route in preparation for establishment of regular patrols.

==== Operations in Syria ====
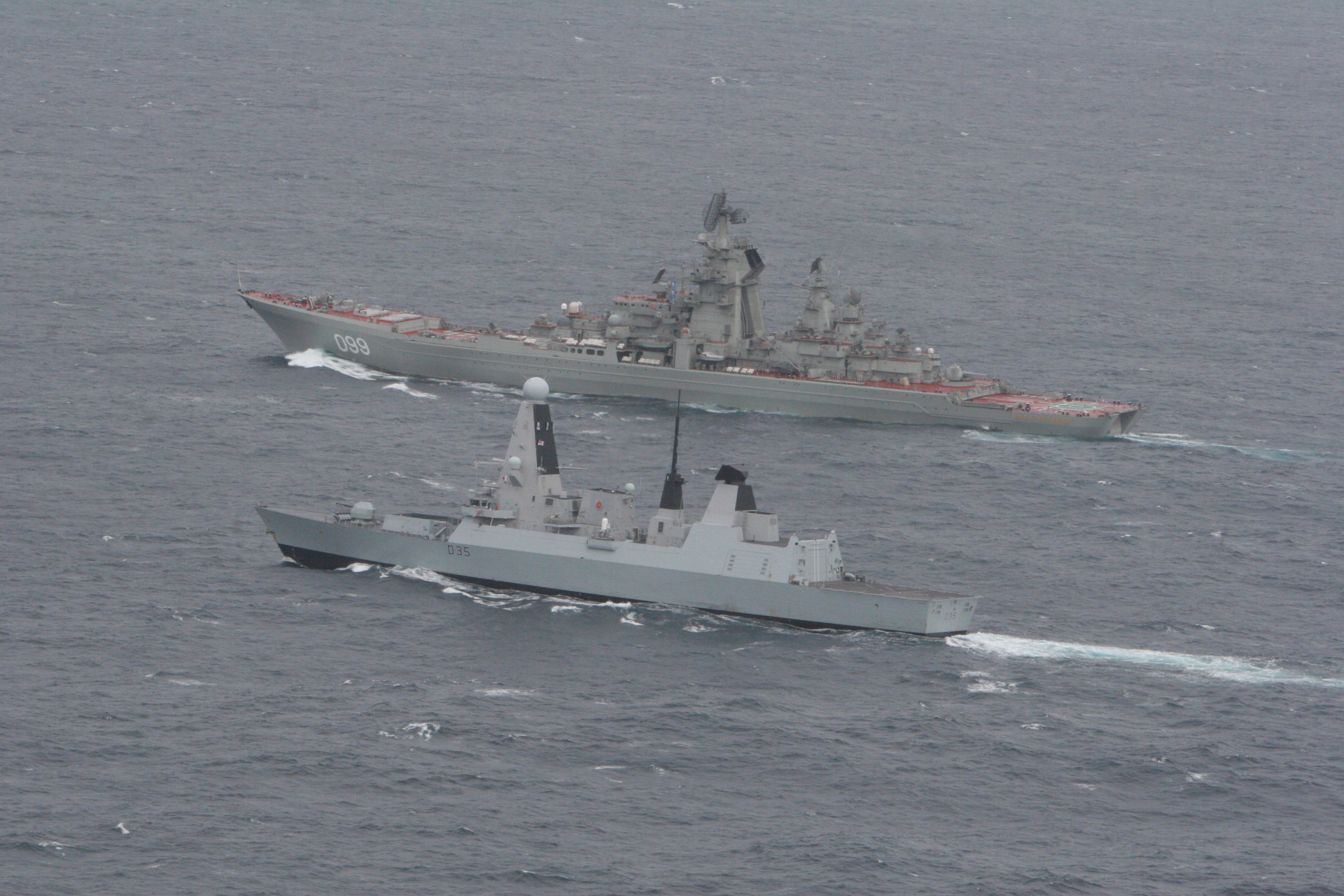
Pyotr Velikiy (background) escorted by HMS Dragon (foreground) off the coast of the United Kingdom in May 2014

In 2014, Pyotr Velikiy along with Admiral Kuznetsov and the tankers Sergey Osipov, Kama and Dubna; the tugboat Altay, and the Ropucha-class landing ship Minsk (122) entered the English Channel to sail north. The British destroyer HMS Dragon monitored the Russian task group as it neared the United Kingdom. Once the ships spotted each other they sailed briefly close by as a standard 'meet and greet'. Pyotr Velikiy participated with the Chinese frigate Yancheng and western vessels in the destruction of Syria's chemical weapons.

In May 2016 Pyotr Velikiy put to sea for the first time in two years for drills off the coast of Northern Russia. On 15 October Pyotr Velikiy left Severomorsk to escort Admiral Kuznetsov to the Mediterranean along with supply ships and two Udaloy-class destroyers, Severomorsk and Vice-Admiral Kulakov. They were heading to the Eastern Mediterranean to support Syrian government forces battling rebel troops in Aleppo. Pyotr Velikiy passed through the Norwegian Sea and the English Channel, along with the rest of the Russian Northern Fleet on 21 October, shadowed by the British destroyer HMS Dragon. Following several months of operating off Syria and a voyage of 18,000 nautical miles in total, Pyotr Velikiy and the rest of the Admiral Kuznetsov carrier strike group returned to Severomorsk on 9 February 2017.

==== 2017–2019 ====
On 17 July 2017 Pyotr Velikiy left Severomorsk together with Dmitry Donskoy, a support vessel and a frigate to participate in the Russian Navy Day celebrations in Kronstadt, Saint Petersburg. The convoy went through Storebælt, the only Danish strait deep enough for Dmitry Donskoy. On 25 July 2017, it was reported that the head of the United Shipbuilding Corporation announced Pyotr Velikiy will undergo a refit after its sister ship, Admiral Nakhimov, returned to service. In August 2017, after returning from the Navy Day parade, Pyotr Velikiy took part in a large-scale exercise of the Northern Fleet involving fifty ships.

In September 2017 Pyotr Veliky and as many as fifty other ships from the Northern Fleet took part in a naval exercise north of the Kola Peninsula, near Norway, as part of the larger Zapad 2017 war games between Russia and Belarus.

On 6 April 2019, the ship entered Barents Sea with cruiser Marshal Ustinov and several nuclear submarines. On 10 October, she went into Barents Sea with some 15 other warships, submarines, and auxiliary ships to conduct large-scale drills.

=== 2020s ===
On 29 May 2020, she went to Barents Sea for exercise. On 11 July, Pyotr Veliky along with cruiser Marshal Ustinov held an exercise in the Barents Sea, both shooting Granit and Vulkan missiles, respectively.

On 24 May 2021 Pyotr Veliky went to sea along with some 10 other warships, including Marshal Ustinov. On 7 June, Pyotr Veliky was still reported at sea, taking part in a 20-ship strong exercise. On 1 July 2021, she went to sea again. On 15 September, the cruiser conducted an exercise in the Barents Sea along with the cruiser Marshal Ustinov, both shooting Granit and Vulkan missiles, respectively.

On 29 January 2022, the cruiser conducted an air defence drill, without leaving the port. On 15 February, Pyotr Veliky, frigate Admiral Gorshkov, diesel and nuclear submarines started an exercise in the Barents Sea. Between 15 and 17 March, she and destroyer Severomorsk held an exercise between Norway and Iceland, during the large-scale NATO naval exercise. On 18 April, Pyotr Veliky was at sea again, conducting an artillery exercise in the Barents Sea. In June, the sailors started preparation for the Navy day parade in July. Between 17 and 26 August, Pyotr Veliky was at sea during a large-scale exercise and shot a Granit missile on 24 August. She was accompanied by destroyer Admiral Ushakov and an unknown number of submarines. At the same time, in the eastern part of the Barents Sea, destroyer Admiral Levchenko, LST Aleksandr Otrakovsky and tanker Sergey Osipov were active and embarked on a voyage eastwards along the Northern Sea Route. During the exercise, destroyer Severomorsk and LST Ivan Gren also passed through the Barents Sea on a way from the main naval parade in St. Petersburg to Severomorsk. On 27 October, she was underway in the Barents Sea. The cruiser went to sea again on 1 November.

Since the autumn of 2022 Pyotr Velikiy has been laid up in Severodvinsk. On 20 April 2023, it was reported that Pyotr Veliky may be withdrawn from service once her sister ship Admiral Nakhimov returns to service. This decision is allegedly being considered due to the high cost of modernisation. However, it was also reported that no decision had been made to withdraw the vessel from service. In October 2026 it was reported that a special commission officially cancelled plans to modernize Pytor Velikiy up to the standard of her sister ship Admiral Nakhimov. This leaves the ship laid up and in limbo until further action is decided on.

== Accident and incidents ==
On 16 October 1996, a Swedish Air Force pilot flying in a Saab 37 Viggen fighter-reconnaissance plane was scouting the Pyotr Velikiy in the Baltic Sea, when he suddenly flew into the water and died while trying to avoid a nearby Russian aircraft during the fly-by reconnaissance of the Russian ship.

On 27 October 1996 an explosion in a turbine pipe outside the reactor section killed five crew members.

Coordinates: 64.5809°N 39.8090°E
