= Belenikhino =

Belenikhino Беленихино
- Selo
- Location within Belgorod Oblast Location within Russia
- Coordinates: 50°56′N 36°37′E
- Country: Russia
- Region: Belgorod Oblast
- District: Prokhorovsky District
- Time zone: UTC+3:00

Belenikhino (Russian: Беленихино) is a rural locality (a selo) and the administrative center of Belenikhinskoye Rural Settlement, Prokhorovsky District, Belgorod Oblast, Russia. The population was 1,183 as of 2010. There are 30 streets.

== Geography ==
Belenikhino is located 17 km southwest of Prokhorovka (the district's administrative centre) by road. Ivanovka is the nearest rural locality.
