= Alexandrovskaya Volost =

Colonies included into Alexandrovskaya Volost upon its establishment in April 1920
- 1. Toros-Ostrov; 2. Sayda-Guba; 3. Dvory; 4. Olenya Guba; 5. Pala-Guba; 6. Volokovaya; 7. Zelentsy; 8. Antonovka; 9. Srednyaya; 10. Belokamennaya; 11. Lovcha; 12. Kulonga; 13. Krasnaya Shchel; 14. Gryaznaya Guba; 15. Roslyakovo; 16. Vayenga; 17. Okoly Ruchey; 18. Alash-Kamen; 19. Platonovka; 20. Tyuva-Guba; 21. Dolgaya Guba

Alexandrovskaya Volost (Russian: Алекса́ндровская во́лость) was an administrative division (a volost) of Alexandrovsky Uyezd of Arkhangelsk Governorate, and later of Murmansk Governorate of the Russian SFSR, which existed in 1920–1927.

The creation of the volost was proposed on April 22, 1920, when the soviet of the town of Alexandrovsk suggested that several colonies of Teriberskaya Volost should be incorporated into a new volost. The proposal was formally approved by the Murmansky Uyezd Executive Committee on June 1, 1920. The administrative center of the new volost was in Alexandrovsk.

On May 3, 1920, the Alexandrovskaya Volost Executive Committee divided the territory of the volost into six selsoviets (the administrative centers are given in parentheses):

1. Alexandrovsky (town of Alexandrovsk)
2. Belokamensky (colony of Belokamennaya/Belokamenka)
3. Gryazno-Gubsky (colony of Gryaznaya Guba)
4. Platonovsky (colony of Platonovka/Pitkovo)
5. Toros-Ostrovsky (colony of Toros-Ostrov)
6. Tyuva-Gubsky (colony of Tyuva-Guba)

However, the Murmansky Uyezd Executive Committee only approved the creation of two (Belokamensky and Tyuva-Gubsky), motivating the decision by the sparseness of the population in the volost. On June 4, 1920, the Alexandrovskaya Volost Executive Committee enacted another decision creating the approved two selsoviets, but already in December 1920 it became clear that it was insufficient, due to high dispersion of the population and lack of reliable communications. On December 9, 1920, the Alexandrovskaya Volost Executive Committee created three more selsoviets, bringing the total number of selsoviets to five (the administrative centers are given in parentheses). This decision was approved by the Murmansky Uyezd Executive Committee on December 18, 1920:

1. Belokamensky (colony of Belokamennaya/Belokamenka)
2. Gryazno-Gubsky (colony of Gryaznaya Guba)
3. Menkinsky, also referred to as Minkinsky (colony of Menkin Ruchey/village of Minkino)
4. Toros-Ostrovsky, also referred to as Sayda-Gubsky (colony of Toros-Ostrov)
5. Tyuvsky Selsoviet, also referred to as Tyuva-Gubsky (colony of Tyuva-Guba)

By the April 20, 1921 Decision of the Plenary Session of Murmansky Uyezd Executive Committee, the localities of Ara, Ura, and Port-Vladimir were transferred from Novozerskaya to Alexandrovskaya Volost. The selo of Ura became the administrative center of Ursky (Ura-Gubsky) Selsoviet.

The volost became a part of Murmansk Governorate at the time of its establishment on June 13, 1921. On March 15, 1926, its administrative center the town of Alexandrovsk was demoted in status to that of a rural locality (a selo). The volost was abolished on August 1, 1927 along with the rest of the volosts of Murmansk Governorate when the latter was transformed into Murmansk Okrug, redistricted, and transferred to the newly created Leningrad Oblast. The territory of the former Alexandrovskaya Volost was divided: Alexandrovsky, Belokamensky, Gryazno-Gubsky, Toros-Ostrovsky, Tyuva-Gubsky, and Ura-Gubsky Selsoviets became a part of Alexandrovsky District while Minkinsky Selsoviet became a part of Kolsko-Loparsky District.
