= Russian aircraft carrier Admiral Kuznetsov =

Heavy aircraft-carrying missile cruiser of the Russian Navy

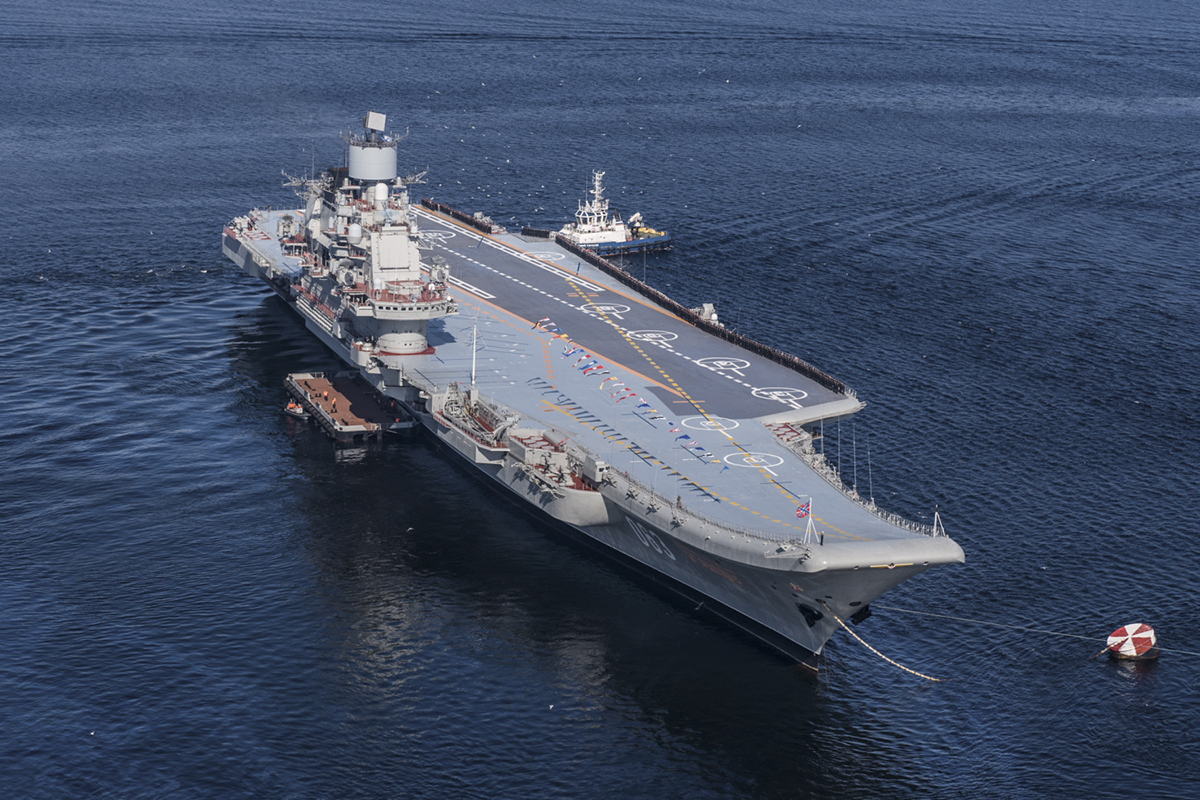
- Admiral of the Fleet of the Soviet Union Kuznetsov in 2017

History

→ Soviet Union → Russia
- Name: Admiral flota Sovetskogo Soyuza Kuznetsov (Russian: Адмирал флота Советского Союза Кузнецов)
- Namesake: Nikolai Kuznetsov
- Ordered: 3 March 1981
- Builder: Nikolayev South
- Laid down: 1 April 1982
- Launched: 6 December 1985
- Commissioned: 20 January 1991 (fully operational in 1995)
- Identification: 063
- Status: Removed from active service after failed overhaul and repair attempts since March 2017.

General characteristics
- Class & type: Kuznetsov-class aircraft carrier
- Displacement: 43,000 t (42,000 long tons) light; 53,000 t (52,000 long tons) standard; 58,600 t (57,700 long tons) full
- Length: 305 m (1,000 ft 8 in) o/a; 270 m (885 ft 10 in) w/l
- Beam: 72 m (236 ft 3 in) o/a; 35 m (114 ft 10 in) w/l
- Draft: 10 m (32 ft 10 in)
- Propulsion: Steam turbines, 8 turbo-pressurised boilers, 4 shafts, 200,000 hp (150 MW); 4 × 50,000 hp (37 MW) turbines; 9 × 2,011 hp (1,500 kW) turbogenerators; 6 × 2,011 hp (1,500 kW) diesel generators; 4 × fixed pitch propellers
- Speed: 29 knots (54 km/h; 33 mph)
- Range: 8,500 nmi (15,700 km; 9,800 mi) at 18 kn (33 km/h; 21 mph)
- Endurance: 45 days
- Complement: 1,690; 626 air group; 40 flag staff
- Armament: 6 × AK-630 CIWS; 8 × CADS-N-1 Kashtan CIWS; 12 × P-700 Granit SSM; 24 × 8-cell 3K95 Kinzhal SAM VLS; RBU-12000 UDAV-1 ASW rocket launchers
- Aircraft carried: 14 × Su-33; 14 × MiG-29K; 2 × MiG-29KUBR; 2 × Su-25UTG; 15 × Ka-27PS; 2 × Ka-31

Admiral Kuznetsov (Russian: Адмира́л фло́та Сове́тского Сою́за Кузнецо́в, romanized: Admiral flota Sovetskogo Soyuza Kuznetsov, lit. 'Admiral of the Fleet of the Soviet Union Kuznetsov') is an aircraft-carrying missile cruiser in Russian classification, which has served as the flagship of the Russian Navy, although she has been out of service since 2017. She was built by the Black Sea Shipyard, the sole manufacturer of Soviet aircraft carriers, in Nikolayev within the Ukrainian Soviet Socialist Republic (Ukrainian SSR) and launched in 1985, becoming fully operational in the Russian Navy in 1995. The initial name of the ship was Riga; she was launched as Leonid Brezhnev, embarked on sea trials as Tbilisi, before she was finally named after Admiral of the Fleet of the Soviet Union Nikolai Kuznetsov. It was the last aircraft carrier of the Russian Navy.

She was originally commissioned in the Soviet Navy, and was intended to be the lead ship of the two-ship Kuznetsov class. However, her sister ship Varyag was still incomplete when the Soviet Union was disbanded in 1991. The second hull was eventually sold by Ukraine to China, completed at Dalian and commissioned as Liaoning. The retirement of the smaller Kiev-class carriers in the 1990s left Admiral Kuznetsov as the sole carrier in the Russian Navy. In November 2016, the carrier first participated in combat operations, launching 420 aircraft sorties during the Aleppo offensive, as part of Russian intervention in the Syrian civil war.

Admiral Kuznetsov has been out of service since March 2017. The modernization, overhaul and repair process has been hampered by accidents, embezzlement of funds, and other setbacks. After the floating drydock PD-50 sank in Kola Bay (Murmansk) in an accident that killed one worker in October 2018, the ship was towed to Sevmorput Yard No 35. In another mishap in December 2019, a major fire killed at least one worker and injured ten others. In June 2022, the ship was transferred to a drydock at the 35th Ship Repair Plant in Murmansk, where she remained until February 2023. It was estimated that repairs would be completed and the ship would be transferred back to the Russian Navy in 2024, but this was delayed to at least 2025. In September 2024, her crew were reassigned to a combat unit engaged in the Russo-Ukrainian war. As of February 2025, she still remains out of service which leaves the Russian Navy without an operational aircraft carrier. In July 2025, it was reported that work on Admiral Kuznetsov had been suspended and that the ship may be dismantled or sold.

== Design ==
The flight deck configuration has three launch positions for fixed-wing aircraft

The design of Admiral Kuznetsov class implies a mission different from that of the United States Navy's carriers. The term used by her builders to describe the Russian ships is Tyazholyy Avianesushchiy Kreyser (TAVKR) – "heavy aircraft-carrying cruiser" – intended to support and defend strategic missile-carrying submarines, surface ships, and naval missile-carrying aircraft of the Russian Navy.

Admiral Kuznetsov's main fixed-wing aircraft is the multi-role Sukhoi Su-33. She can perform air superiority, fleet defence, and air support missions and can also be used for direct fire support of amphibious assault, reconnaissance and placement of naval mines. The carrier also carries the Kamov Ka-27 and Kamov Ka-27S helicopters for anti-submarine warfare, search and rescue, and small transport. In total, it can carry 26 aircraft and 24 helicopters on the flight deck and in the sub-deck hangar.

For take-off of fixed-wing aircraft, Admiral Kuznetsov has a ski-jump at the end of her bow. When taking off, aircraft accelerate toward and up the ski-jump using their afterburners. This results in the aircraft leaving the deck at a higher angle and elevation than on an aircraft carrier with a flat deck and catapults. The ski-jump take-off is less demanding on the pilot's body, since the acceleration is lower, but results in a clearance speed of only 120–140 km/h (75–87 mph; 65–76 kn) requiring an aircraft design which will not stall at those speeds.

The "cruiser" role is facilitated by Admiral Kuznetsov's complement of 12 long-range surface-to-surface anti-ship P-700 Granit (NATO reporting name: SS-N-19 Shipwreck) cruise missiles, resulting in the ship's Russian type designator of "heavy aircraft-carrying missile cruiser".

Unlike most western naval ships that use gas turbines or nuclear power, Admiral Kuznetsov is a conventionally powered ship that uses mazut as a fuel, often leading to a visible trail of heavy black smoke that can be seen at a great distance. Russian naval officials have said that the failure to properly preheat the heavy mazut fuel prior to entering the combustion chamber may contribute to the heavy smoke trail associated with the ship.

=== Transiting the Turkish Straits ===
Admiral Kuznetsov's designation as an aircraft-carrying cruiser is important under the Montreux Convention, as it allows the ship to transit the Turkish Straits. The Convention prohibits countries from sending an aircraft carrier heavier than 15,000 tons through the Straits. Since the ship was built in the Ukrainian SSR, Admiral Kuznetsov would have been stuck in the Black Sea if Turkey had refused permission to pass into the Mediterranean Sea. However, the Convention does not limit the displacement of capital ships operated by Black Sea powers. Turkey allowed Admiral Kuznetsov to transit the Straits, and no signatory to the Montreux Convention ever issued a formal protest of her classification as an aircraft-carrying cruiser.

== History ==
=== 1982–1991: construction and dispute of ownership ===
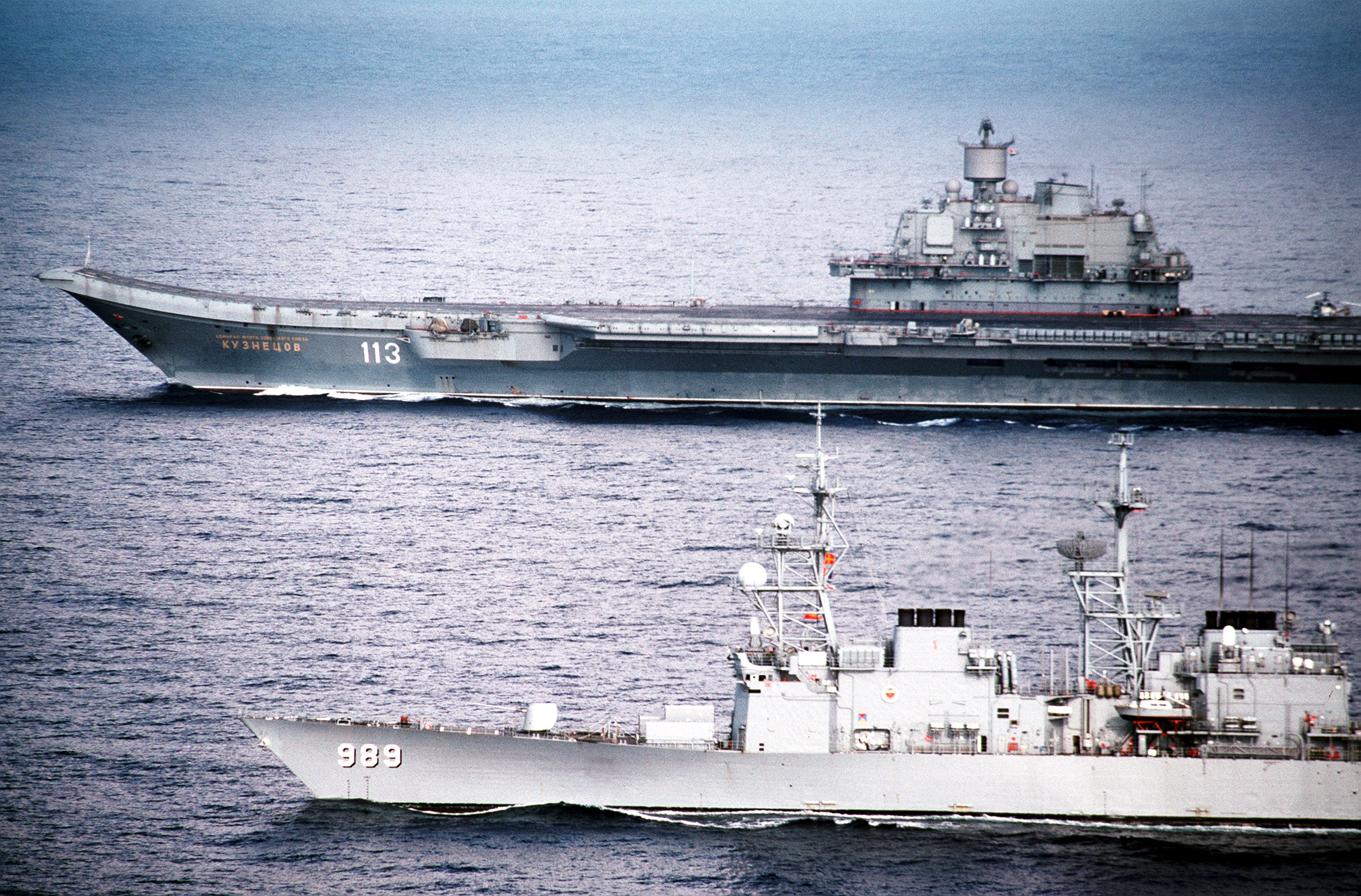
Admiral Kuznetsov in the waters south of Italy with USS Deyo, foreground, steaming off her port side, December 1991

Admiral Flota Sovetskogo Soyuza Kuznetsov, constructed at Chernomorskiy Shipyard, also known as Nikolayev South Shipyard, in Nikolayev within the Ukrainian Soviet Socialist Republic (SSR) was launched in 1985, and became fully operational in 1995. An official ceremony marking the start of construction took place on 1 September 1982; in fact she was laid down in 1983. The vessel was first named Riga, then the name was changed to Leonid Brezhnev, this was followed by Tbilisi. Finally, on 4 October 1990, she was renamed Admiral Flota Sovetskogo Soyuza N.G. Kuznetsov, referred to in short as Admiral Kuznetsov. The ship was 71% complete by mid-1989. In November 1989 she undertook her first aircraft operations.

After the 1991 Soviet coup d'état attempt and the independence of Ukraine, Ukrainian president Leonid Kravchuk sent a telegram to the ship's commander Viktor Yarygin, declaring that Admiral Kuznetsov was Ukrainian property, and that the ship should remain in Sevastopol until the Ukrainian government made a decision on her fate. Deputy commander of the Northern Fleet Yuri Ustimenko urgently arrived from the Arctic to pre-empt the Ukrainian government and gave the order for Admiral Kuznetsov to sail to Vidyayevo so the ship could remain in the Soviet fleet. In December 1991, she sailed from the Black Sea to join the Northern Fleet.

=== 1995–1996 deployment ===
From 23 December 1995 through 22 March 1996 Admiral Kuznetsov made her first 90-day Mediterranean deployment with 13 Su-33, 2 Su-25 UTG, and 11 helicopters aboard. The deployment of the Russian navy's flagship was undertaken to mark the 300th anniversary of the establishment of the Russian navy in October 1996. The deployment was to allow the carrier, which was accompanied by a frigate, destroyer and oiler, to adapt to the Mediterranean climate and to perform continuous flight operations until 21:00 each day, as the Barents Sea only receives about one hour of sunlight during that time of year. During that period the carrier lay at anchor off the port of Tartus, Syria. Her aircraft often made flights close to the Israeli shore line and were escorted by Israeli F-16s. During the deployment, a severe water shortage occurred due to evaporators breaking down.

=== 1997–1998 overhaul ===
The ship was immobilized in a Northern Fleet shipyard at the end of 1997 after repairs had been halted due to a lack of funding. After the overhaul was completed, the ship returned to active service in the Northern fleet on 3 November 1998.

=== 2000–2006 ===
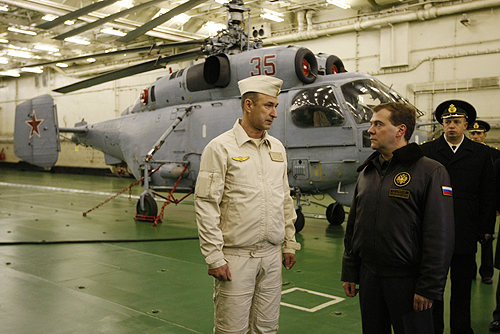
President Dmitry Medvedev inside the hangar bay, October 2008. Behind is the Kamov Ka-27 helicopter.

Admiral Kuznetsov remained in port for two years before preparing for another Mediterranean deployment scheduled for the winter of 2000–2001. This deployment was canceled due to the explosion and sinking of the nuclear-powered submarine Kursk. Admiral Kuznetsov participated in the Kursk rescue and salvage operations in late 2000. Plans for further operations were postponed or cancelled. In late 2003 and early 2004, Admiral Kuznetsov went to sea for inspection and sea trials. In October 2004, the ship participated in a fleet exercise of the Russian Navy in the Atlantic Ocean. During a September 2005 exercise, a Su-33 accidentally fell from the carrier into the Atlantic Ocean. On 27 September 2006, it was announced that Admiral Kuznetsov would return to service in the Northern Fleet by the year's end, following another modernization to correct some technical issues. Admiral Vladimir Masorin, Commander-in-Chief of the Russian Navy, also stated that Su-33 fighters assigned to her would return after undergoing their own maintenance and refits.

=== 2007–2008 deployment ===
From 5 December 2007 through 3 February 2008 Admiral Kuznetsov made her second Mediterranean deployment. On 11 December 2007, Admiral Kuznetsov passed by Norwegian oil platforms in the North Sea, 60 nautical miles (110 km) outside Bergen, Norway. Su-33 fighters and Kamov helicopters were launched from Admiral Kuznetsov while within international waters; Norwegian helicopter services to the rigs were halted due to the collision risk with the Russian aircraft. Admiral Kuznetsov later participated in an exercise on the Mediterranean Sea, together with 11 other Russian surface ships and 47 aircraft, performing three tactical training missions using live and simulated air and surface missile launches. Admiral Kuznetsov and her escorts returned to Severomorsk on 3 February 2008. Following maintenance, she returned to sea on 11 October 2008 for the Stability 2008 strategic exercises held in the Barents Sea. On 12 October 2008, Russian President Dmitry Medvedev visited the ship during the exercise.

=== 2008–2009 deployment ===
From 5 December 2008 through 2 March 2009, Admiral Kuznetsov made her third Mediterranean deployment. On 5 December 2008, the carrier and several other vessels left Severomorsk for the Atlantic for a combat training tour, including joint drills with Russia's Black Sea Fleet and visits to several Mediterranean ports. On 7 January 2009, a small fire broke out onboard Admiral Kuznetsov while anchored off Turkey. The fire, caused by a short circuit, led to the death of one crew member by carbon monoxide poisoning. On 16 February 2009, she was involved in a large oil spill, along with other Russian naval vessels, while refuelling off the south coast of Ireland. On 2 March 2009, Admiral Kuznetsov returned to Severomorsk, and in September 2010, she left dry dock after scheduled repairs and preparations for a training mission in the Barents Sea, later that month.

=== 2011–2012 deployment ===
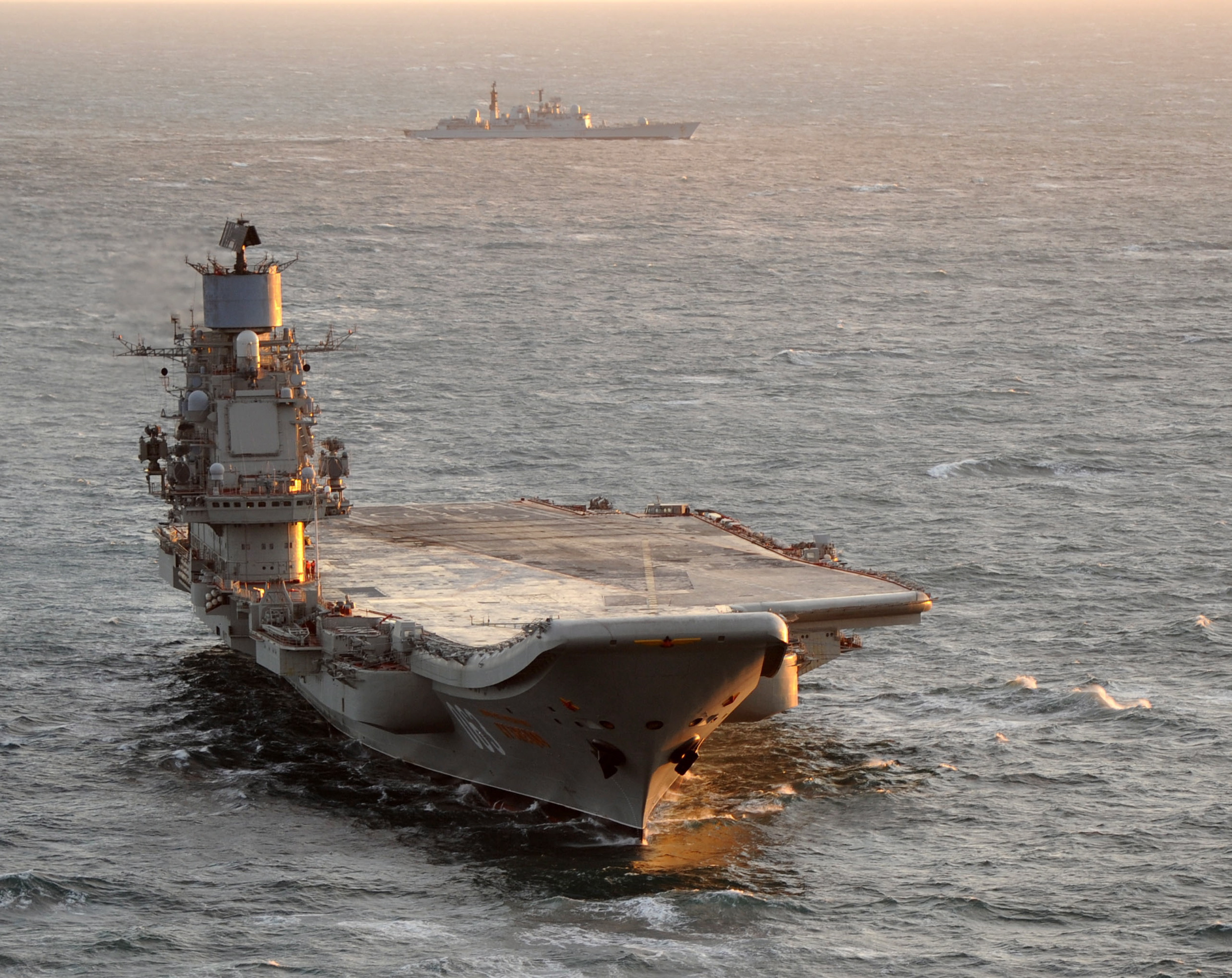
Admiral Kuznetsov, shadowed by British destroyer HMS York off the UK coast, en route to a Mediterranean cruise, December 2011

The Russian Main Navy Staff announced that Admiral Kuznetsov would begin a deployment to the Atlantic and Mediterranean in December 2011. In November 2011, it was announced that Admiral Kuznetsov would lead a squadron to Russia's naval facility in Tartus.

A Russian naval spokesman announced via the Izvestia daily that "The call of the Russian ships in Tartus should not be seen as a gesture towards what is going on in Syria... This was planned already in 2010 when there were no such events there" noting that Admiral Kuznetsov would also be making port calls in Beirut, Genoa and Cyprus. On 29 November 2011, Army General Nikolay Makarov, Chief of the Russian General Staff, said that Russian ships in the Mediterranean were due to exercises rather than events in Syria, and noted that Admiral Kuznetsov's size does not allow her to moor in Tartus.

On 6 December 2011, Admiral Kuznetsov and her escort ships departed the Northern Fleet home base in Severomorsk for a Mediterranean deployment to exercise with ships from the Russian Baltic and Black Sea Fleets. On 12 December 2011, Admiral Kuznetsov and her escorts, were spotted northeast of Orkney off the coast of northern Scotland, the first such time she had deployed near the UK. HMS York shadowed the group for a week; due to severe weather, the group took shelter in international waters in the Moray Firth, some 30 miles (48 km) from the UK coast. Admiral Kuznetsov then sailed around the top of Scotland and into the Atlantic past western Ireland, where she conducted flight operations with her Sukhoi Su-33 'Flanker' jets and Kamov Ka-27 helicopters in international airspace. On 8 January 2012, Admiral Kuznetsov anchored near shore outside Tartus while other ships from her escort entered the port to use the leased Russian naval support facility to replenish their supplies, after which all ships continued their deployment on 9 January. In February 2012, Admiral Kuznetsov returned to her home base of Severomorsk, having lost propulsion during the return voyage in the Bay of Biscay. The tugboat Nikolay Chiker took the vessel in tow and aided Admiral Kuznetsov's return.

=== 2013–2014 deployment ===
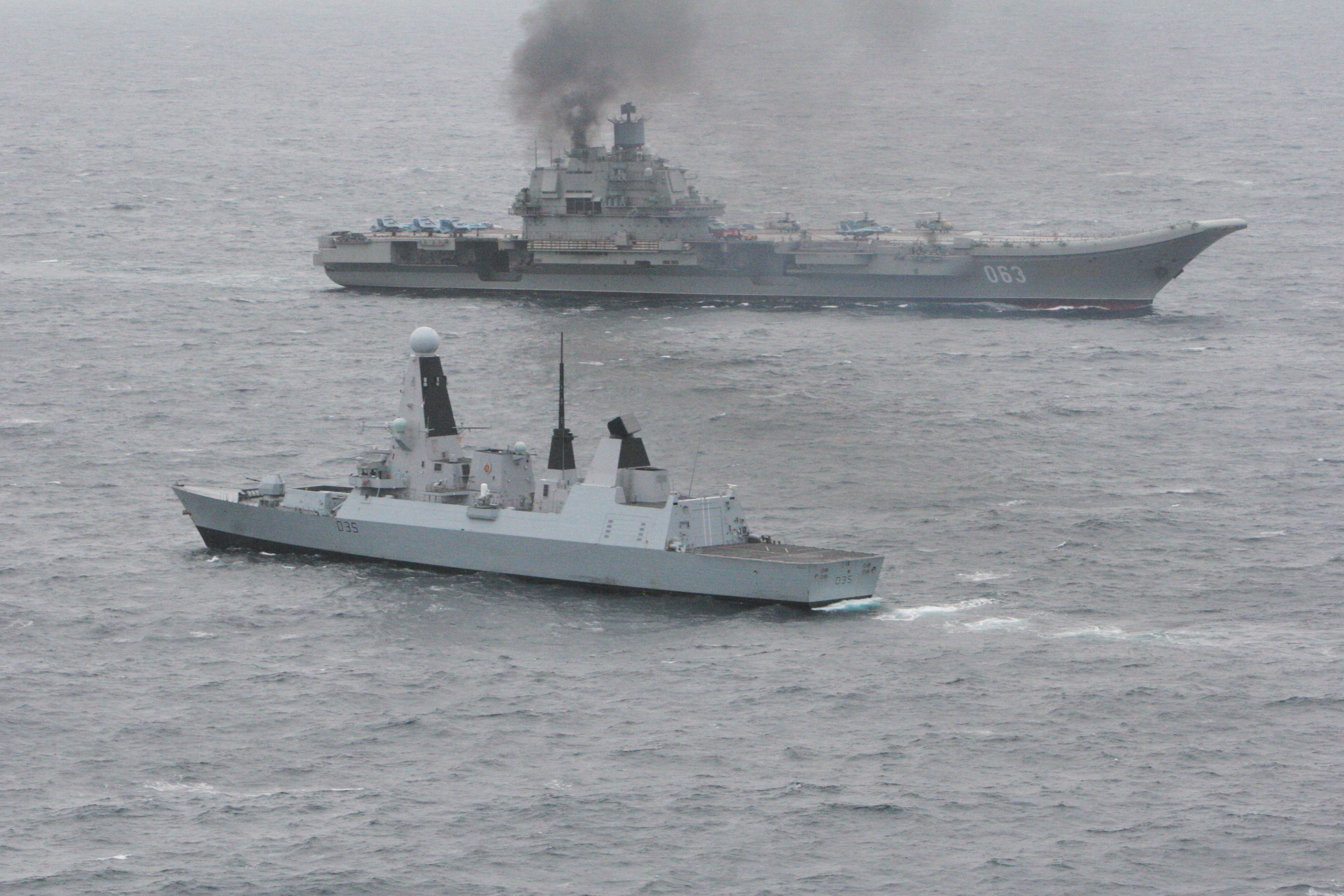
Escorted by HMS Dragon off the UK coast, May 2014

On 1 June 2013, it was announced that the ship would return to the Mediterranean by the end of the year, and on 17 December, Admiral Kuznetsov departed her home base for the Mediterranean. On 1 January 2014, Admiral Kuznetsov celebrated New Year's Day while at anchor in international waters of the Moray Firth off northeast Scotland. The anchorage allowed replenishment of ship's supplies and respite for the crew from stormy weather off the southwest coast of Norway. She then proceeded to the Mediterranean Sea, docking in Cyprus on 28 February. In May 2014, the ship and her task group: the Kirov-class nuclear-powered cruiser Petr Velikiy; tankers Sergey Osipov, Kama and Dubna; the ocean-going tug Altay and the Ropucha-class landing ship Minsk (part of the Black Sea Fleet), passed the UK while sailing for home. Despite financial and technical problems, resulting in limited operations for the ship, it was expected that Admiral Kuznetsov would remain in active service until at least 2030.

=== 2016–2017 deployment ===
Kamov Ka-52s and Ka-29s, part of the Admiral Kuznetsov's helicopters complement performing live fire operations sometime in 2016 or 2017.

Admiral Kuznetsov set sail on 15 October 2016 from Severomorsk for the Mediterranean, accompanied by seven other vessels of the Russian Navy including the nuclear-powered battlecruiser Pyotr Velikiy and two Udaloy-class destroyers. The carrier was accompanied by an ocean-going tugboat as a precaution due to potential propulsion failure. The carrier air wing included six to eight Sukhoi Su-33 fighters, four MiG-29KR/KUBR multi-role aircraft, Ka-52K "Katran" navalised attack helicopters, Ka-31R "Helix" AEW&C helicopters and Ka-27PS "Helix-D" search and rescue helicopters. All the Su-33 aircraft had been upgraded with the Gefest SVP-24 bombsights for free-fall bombs, giving them a limited ground-attack capability. Analysts suggested that a lack of trained pilots restricted the number of fixed-wing aircraft that could be deployed from the carrier.

In the largest Russian military deployment since the Cold War, the carrier battle group sailed through the English Channel on 21 October. The Royal Navy responded to this test by sending two of its own ships to escort the Russian warships. On 26 October 2016 the ship was reported to have passed through the Strait of Gibraltar and refuelled at sea off North Africa the following day. On 3 November 2016 the carrier battle group paused off the east coast of Crete. On 14 November 2016 a MiG-29K crashed into the sea after taking off from the carrier. The pilot ejected safely from the plane and was rescued by helicopter. The plane had run out of fuel waiting to land while the crew was attempting to repair a broken arresting cable. The carrier commander could have diverted the aircraft to land at a nearby airbase, but hesitated in the hope that the arresting gear would be repaired in time.

The Admiral Kuznetsov's air wing performing battle operations off the coast of Syria.

On 15 November 2016 — as part of a large-scale engagement — Admiral Kuznetsov launched Su-33 strikes against the positions of terrorist groups Islamic State and Al-Nusra in the provinces of Idlib and Homs in Syria. This was the first time the aircraft carrier had ever participated in combat operations. The Russian Defence Ministry later reported that at least 30 militants had been killed as a result of those strikes, including three field commanders, among them Abul Baha al-Asfari, leader of Al-Nusra reserve forces in the provinces of Homs and Aleppo. Al-Asfari had also planned and led several insurgent attacks on the city of Aleppo. The Su-33s reportedly used 500 kg (1,100 lb) precision-guided munitions. On 3 December 2016 an Su-33 crashed into the sea after attempting to land on the carrier. The pilot was safely recovered by a search and rescue helicopter. Later it was revealed that the arresting gear mechanism had failed to hold the aircraft, and was damaged in the attempt. Following this second incident, the air wing was transferred to shore at Khmeimim Air Base near Latakia to continue military operations while the carrier's arresting gear issues were addressed.

In early January 2017 it was announced that Admiral Kuznetsov and her battlegroup would be ceasing operations in Syria and returning to Russia as part of a scaling back of Russian involvement in the conflict. During her deployment off Syria, aircraft from Admiral Kuznetsov carried out 420 combat missions, hitting 1,252 hostile targets. On 11 January 2017, Admiral Kuznetsov was conducting live-fire training exercises in the Mediterranean off the coast of Libya. The Russian defence ministry announced that on 11 January, Admiral Kuznetsov was visited by Libya's military leader Khalifa Haftar, who had a video conference with Russian defence minister Sergey Shoygu while on board.

The Su-33s and Mig-29Ks of the Northern Fleet Naval Aviation return to their home base in Severomorsk after operations in Syria onboard the Admiral Kuznetsov

On 20 January Admiral Kuznetsov was sighted passing west through the Strait of Gibraltar and six days later, she was escorted back along the English Channel by three Eurofighter Typhoons of the Royal Air Force and the Type 23 frigate HMS St Albans. It arrived back in Severomorsk on 9 February. On 23 February 2017 President Vladimir Putin said that the ship's deployment to the Mediterranean had been his personal initiative.

=== 2017–present: overhaul ===
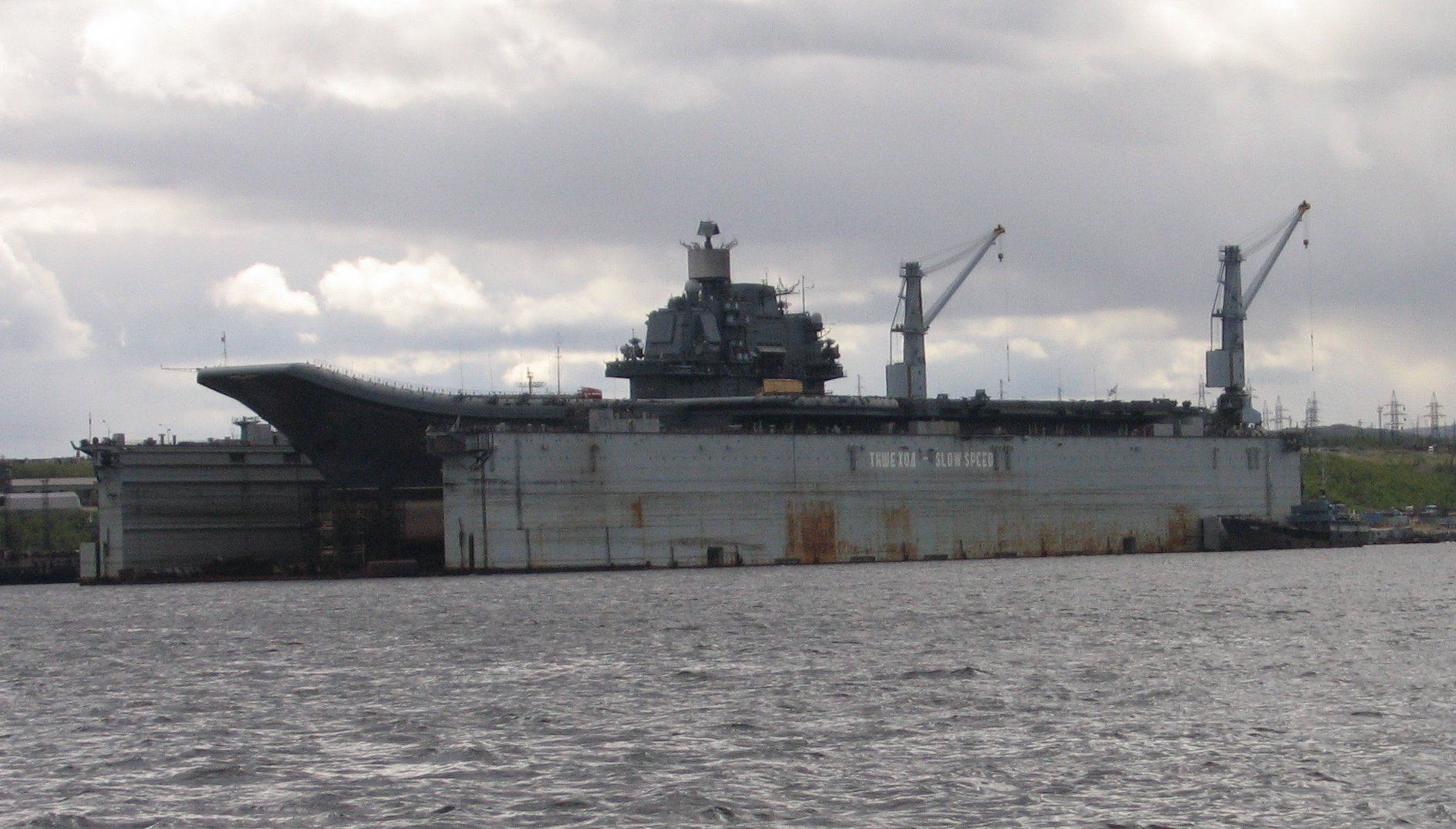
Docked in PD-50, June 2006

Admiral Kuznetsov started an overhaul and modernization program in the first quarter of 2017 to extend her service life by 25 years. The ship was to undergo modernization at the 35th Ship Repair Plant in Murmansk between 2018 and 2021, upgrading the ship's power plant and electronics systems.

On 30 October 2018, the ship was damaged when Russia's biggest floating drydock, PD-50, sank, causing one of its 70-ton cranes to crash onto the ship's flight deck, leaving behind a 19-square-metre (200 sq ft) hole. One person was reported missing and four were injured as the drydock sank in Kola Bay. The ship was in the process of being removed from the dock when the incident occurred and was towed to a nearby yard after the incident. The cost of repairing the damage was estimated to be RUB 70 million (about US$1 million). The fallen crane was removed by the end of 2018.

In late May 2019, repair work of the aircraft carrier was underway. That same month, it was also announced that two graving docks in Murmansk would be merged and enlarged to accommodate the ship, the work taking a year and a half. In December 2019, a major fire broke out on board the ship as work continued on the ship's refit. Two people died and more than a dozen were injured in the fire, and damage to the ship was estimated at US$8 million.

In June 2021, Vladimir Korolev, Vice President of the United Shipbuilding Corporation announced that the overhaul and upgrade of Admiral Kuznetsov was expected to be completed by the first half of 2023. The avionics, flight deck with the ski jump, electric equipment, and the power plant were expected to be replaced as part of this process. The carrier would also receive a new fully domestic takeoff and landing control system, with the onboard airpower remaining the same. Due to the lack of a large enough drydock, a new drydock was being constructed in Murmansk. In November 2021 it was reported that "bad weather" had caused significant delays to repair work which might push back the completion of the refit by more than one year.

The ship was finally dry-docked on 20 May 2022. By 27 July 2022, the drydock had been drained, allowing repairs on the aircraft carrier to commence. On 15 August 2022, the head of the United Shipbuilding Corporation confirmed that Admiral Kuznetsov would be handed over to the Russian Navy in the first quarter of 2024, and that the ship is expected to remain in service for at least another 25 years. On 22 December 2022, as the ship was being prepared to leave drydock, another fire occurred. The fire was extinguished, and no casualties were reported. On 25 January 2023, it was reported that Admiral Kuznetsov would leave the drydock in February 2023. The aircraft carrier was removed from the drydock on 21 February 2023, although it was initially reported that the operation had been suspended due to heavy fog.

Prior to the December 2022 fire the overhaul of the carrier was projected to last into 2024.

In September 2024, an OSINT analysis revealed that Admiral Kuznetsov's crew of approximately 1,500 sailors were reassigned to the Russian Army for combat duty in Ukraine. This fueled speculation that there is no plan to make Admiral Kuznetsov seaworthy again. As of July 2025, it was reported that repair and modernization work on the carrier had been suspended and that Russian Defence Ministry is considering scrapping the vessel due to the ship's age and condition and the mounting cost of its overhaul. The same month, UK Defence Journal reported public comments by Admiral Sergei Avakyants, former head of Russia's Pacific Fleet, suggesting institutional support for the decision to retire the carrier. He described classic aircraft carriers as expensive and inefficient in modern conflict scenarios, arguing that unmanned systems and robotic platforms are the future. Russian media outlet www1.ru reported in January 2026 that Admiral Kuznetsov may be repaired once the PD-50 floating dock is repaired.

In February 2026, Ecuadorian news sources reported that the Admiral Kuznetsov would be decommissioned due to the high cost of repairs.

Ultimately, due to excessive repair costs and deterioration, Murmansk's Integrated Shipbuilding Corporation officially confirmed the suspension of retrofitting work in July 2025. On the 25th of the same month, Andrei, CEO of Integrated Shipbuilding Corporation, announced that they were discussing scrap disposal with the Russian Ministry of Defense.

== Gallery ==
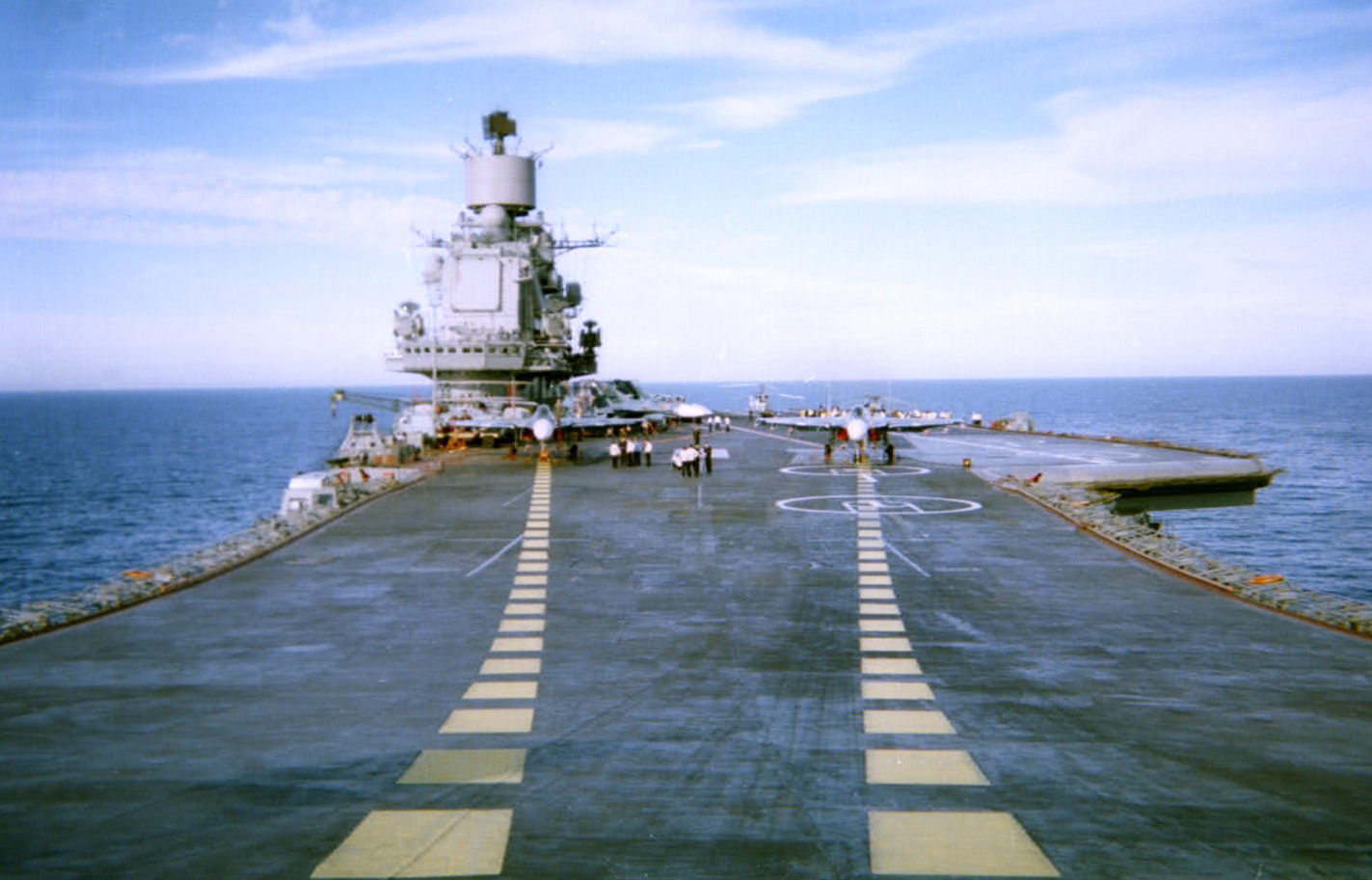
Flight deck, June 2006

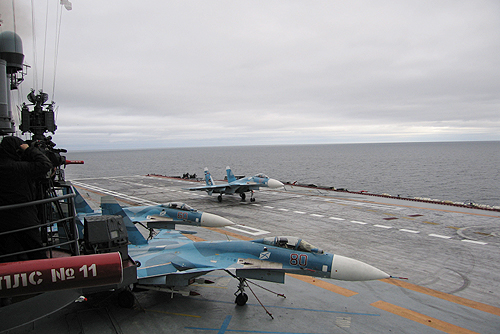
Sukhoi Su-33 aircraft on the flight deck during exercises in the Barents Sea, October 2008

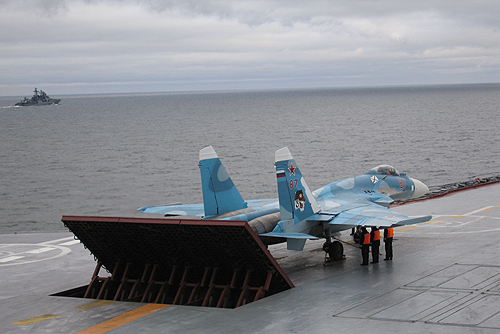
Sukhoi Su-33 preparing to take off from Admiral Kuznetsov in the Barents Sea, October 2008

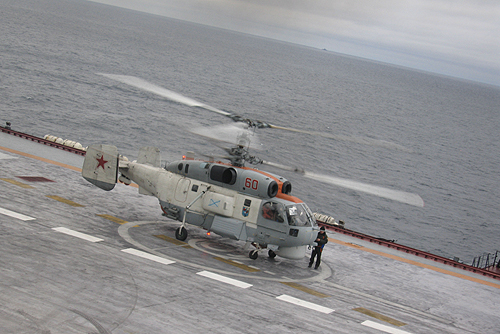
Kamov Ka-27 on the flight deck, October 2008

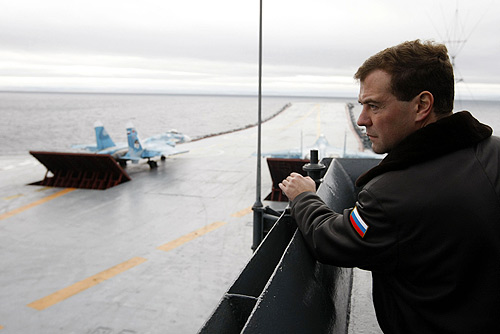
President Dmitry Medvedev aboard Admiral Kuznetsov, October 2008

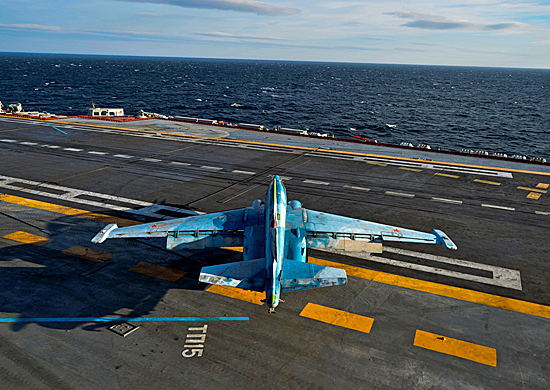
Sukhoi Su-25UTG on the flight deck, April 2011

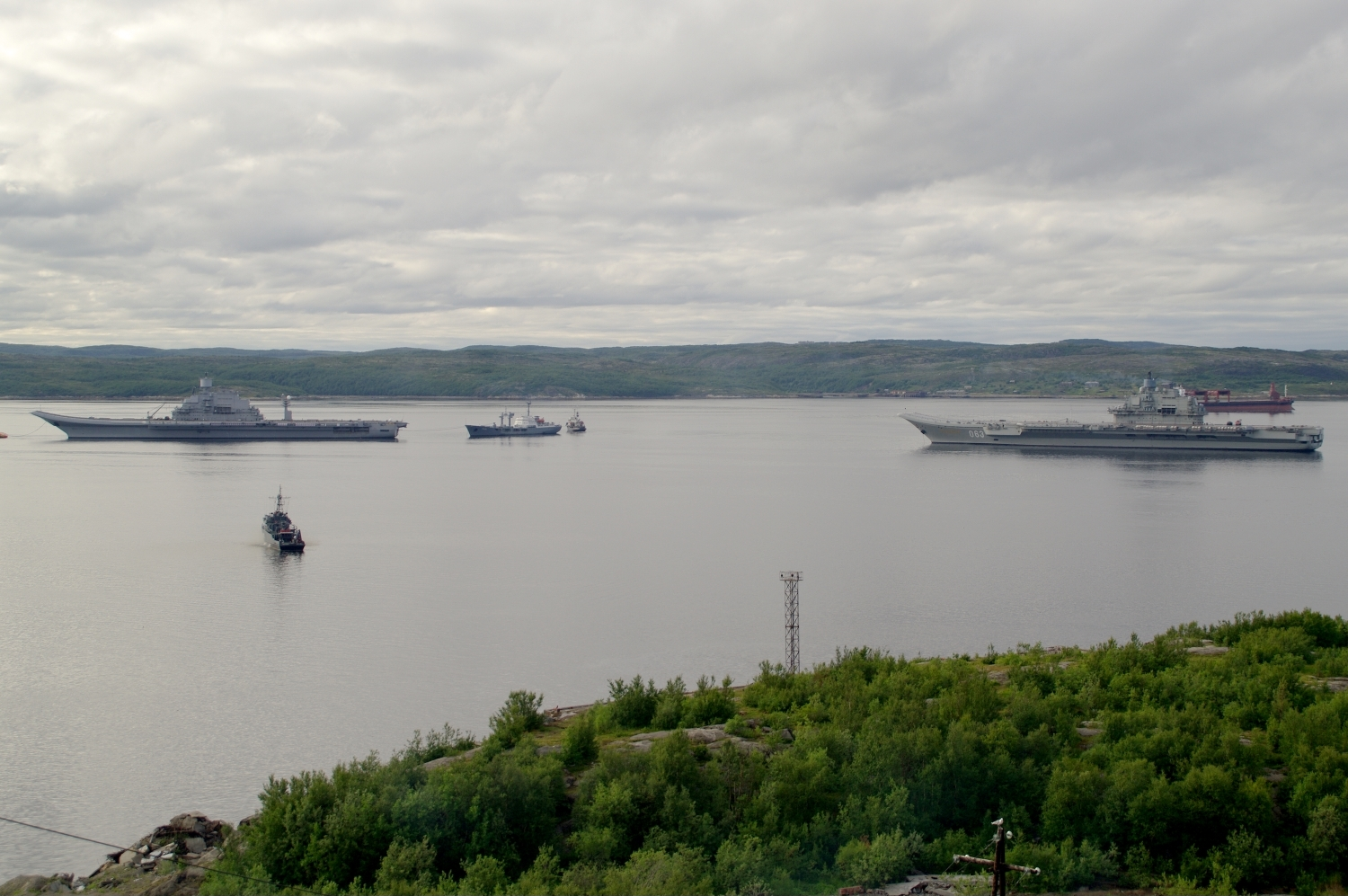
Admiral Kuznetsov (right) at anchor in Severomorsk, alongside the Indian Navy aircraft carrier INS Vikramaditya, July 2012

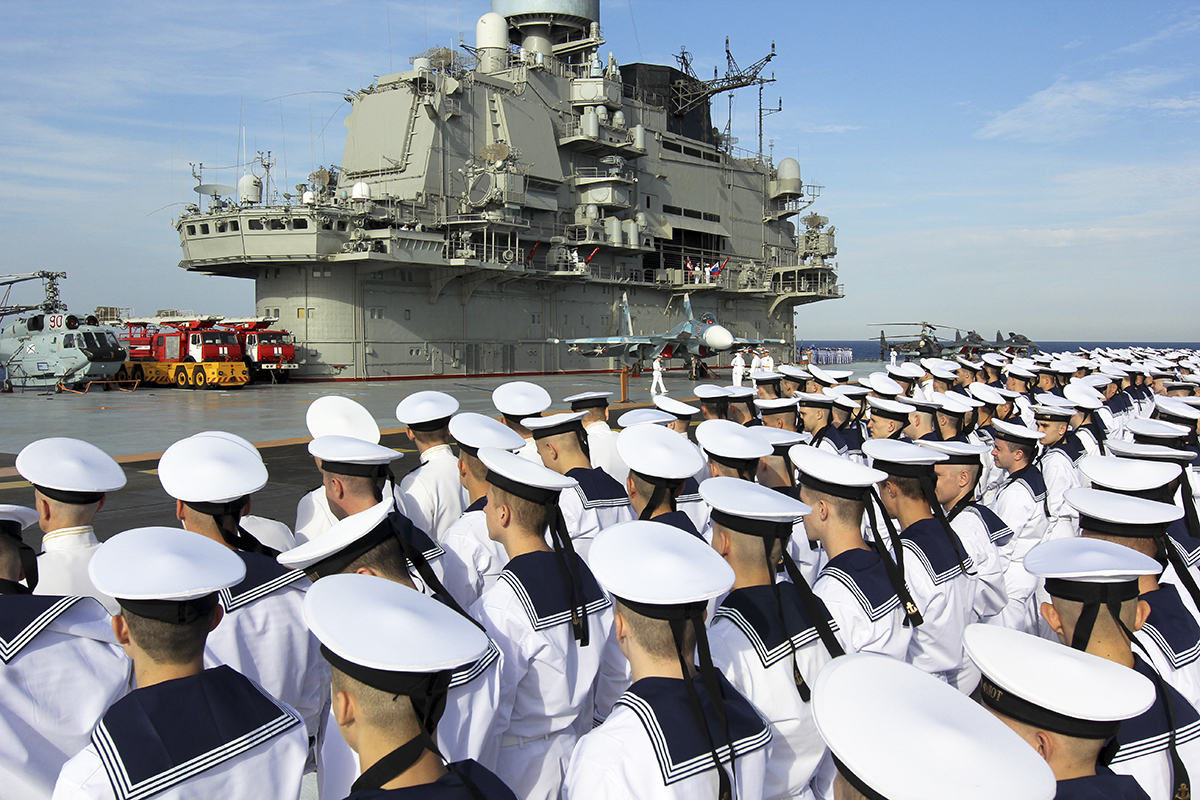
Russian sailors lined up on the flight deck, November 2016

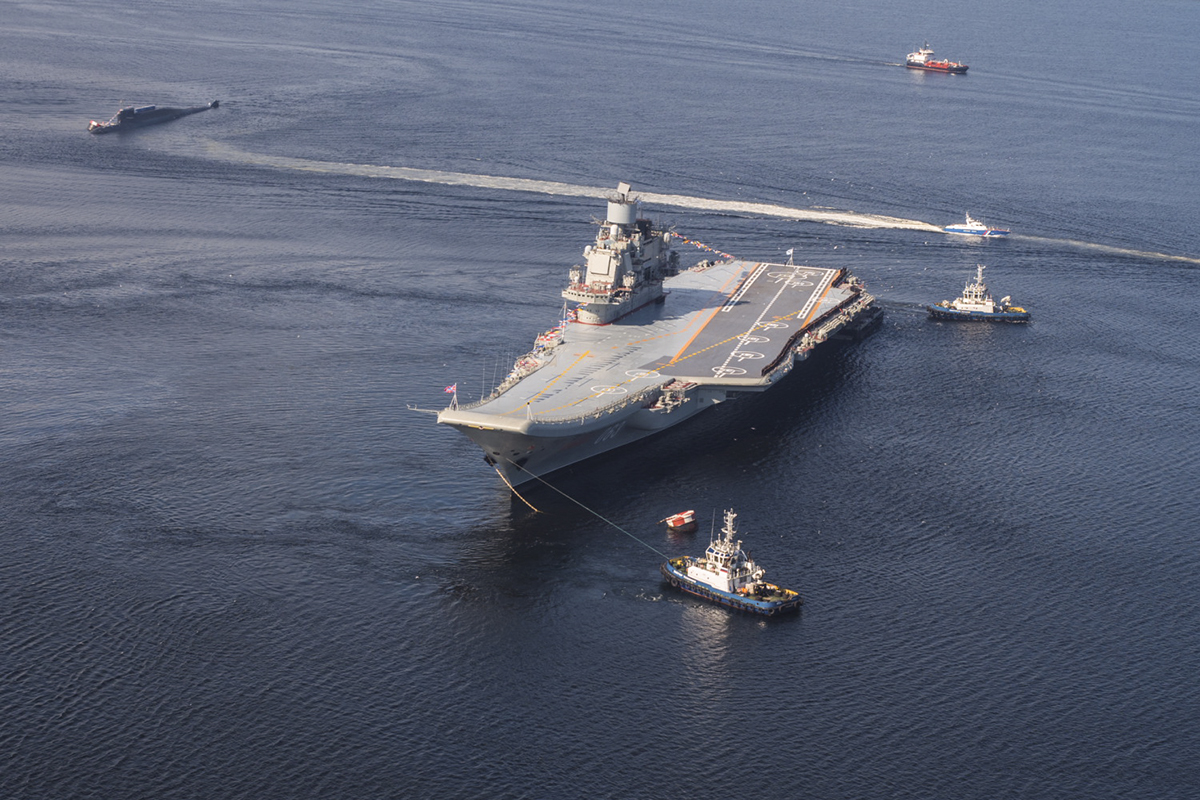
At the rehearsal of the parade of ships of the Northern Fleet on 27 July 2017

== See also ==
- List of aircraft carriers
