= Colony (Russian Empire) =

In the Russian Empire, a colony (Russian: колония) was a type of settlement, typically agricultural, created under government encouragement in sparsely populated territories. Most commonly they were created by foreigners invited to resettle to Russia but there were also efforts to create Jewish colonies for resettling Jews from other areas within the Pale of settlement. The settlers were called colonists (Russian: колонисты).

For example, this was done in newly acquired lands, such as Novorossiya and Bessarabia.

== See also ==
- Military settlement
- Volga Germans
- Slavo-Serbia
- New Serbia
- Jewish agricultural colonies of Bessarabia
