= Theodor Weissenberger =

German World War II flying ace (1914–1950)

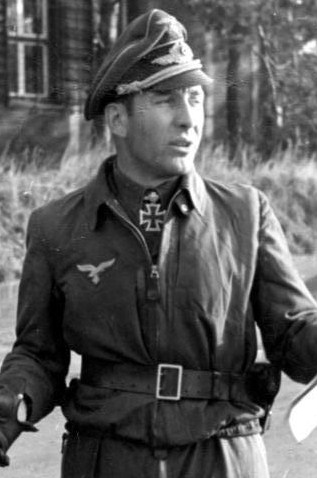
- Theodor Weissenberger 1944
- Born: 21 December 1914; Mühlheim am Main, German Empire
- Died: 11 June 1950 (aged 35); Nürburgring, West Germany
- Military career
- Allegiance: Nazi Germany
- Branch: Luftwaffe
- Service years: 1936–1945
- Rank: Major (Major)
- Units: JG 77, JG 5, JG 7
- Commands: II./JG 5, I./JG 5, I./JG 7, JG 7
- Conflicts: See battles World War II: Eastern Front; Continuation War; Western Front; Invasion of Normandy; Defense of the Reich
- Awards: Knight's Cross of the Iron Cross with Oak Leaves
- Other work: Auto racing

Theodor Weissenberger (21 December 1914 – 11 June 1950) was a German Luftwaffe military aviator during World War II and a fighter ace credited with 208 enemy aircraft shot down in 375 combat missions. The majority of his victories were claimed near the Arctic Ocean in the northern sector of the Eastern Front, but he also claimed 33 victories over the Western Front. He claimed eight of these victories over the Western Allies while flying the Messerschmitt Me 262 jet fighter.

Born in Mühlheim am Main in the German Empire, Weissenberger, who had been a glider pilot in his youth, volunteered for service in the Luftwaffe of Nazi Germany in 1936. Following flight training, he was posted to the heavy fighter squadron of Jagdgeschwader 77 (JG 77—77th Fighter Wing) in 1941. He claimed his first aerial victory over Norway on 24 October 1941. After 23 aerial victories as heavy fighter pilot, he received the German Cross in Gold and was then posted to Jagdgeschwader 5 (JG 5—5th Fighter Wing) in September 1942. There he received the Knight's Cross of the Iron Cross on 13 November 1942 after 38 aerial victories.

In June 1943, Weissenberger was appointed Staffelkapitän of 7. Staffel of JG 5. Following his 112th aerial victory, he was awarded the Knight's Cross of the Iron Cross with Oak Leaves on 2 August 1943. He was appointed Staffelkapitän of 6. Staffel in September 1943 and in March 1944 he was given command of II. Gruppe of JG 5 which was operating in Defense of the Reich missions. In June 1944 he took command of I. Gruppe of JG 5 which defended against the Invasion of Normandy. Weissenberger claimed 25 aerial victories in this theater, which included his 200th victory on 25 July 1944.

After conversion training to the Me 262 jet fighter, he was appointed commander of I. Gruppe of Jagdgeschwader 7 "Nowotny" (JG 7—7th Fighter Wing), the first operational jet fighter wing in the world, in November 1944. Promoted to Major (major), he took command of JG 7 "Nowotny" as a Geschwaderkommodore in January 1945, a position he held until the end of hostilities.

He was killed in a car racing accident on 11 June 1950 at the Nürburgring.

== Early life and career ==
Weissenberger, the son of a plant nursery owner, was born on 21 December 1914 in Mühlheim am Main in the Grand Duchy of Hesse of the German Empire. He had a brother Otto who also served as a pilot in Luftwaffe. (Note: Feldwebel Otto Weissenberger, a fighter pilot with IV. Gruppe of Jagdgeschwader 3, was shot down in his Focke-Wulf Fw 190 A-6 (Werknummer 531057—factory number) and killed in action on 23 March 1944 in the vicinity of Nordick.) As a glider pilot with the German Air Sports Association (Deutscher Luftsportverband), he made his maiden flight on 16 November 1935. On 20 July 1941 he logged his 645th flight as a glider pilot, in total 196 hours and 46 minutes of powerless flight. Most of these flights were made as an instructor over the Rhön Mountains, Silesia and Bavaria.

He joined the military service of the Luftwaffe with 2./Flieger-Ersatz-Abteilung 14 (2nd Company of Flier Replacement Unit 14) in Detmold on 19 October 1936. There he was promoted to Feldwebel of the Reserves on 1 December 1940.

== World War II ==
Weissenberger was posted to a front-line unit on 27 August 1941, almost two years after the start of World War II. His unit, 1.(Z)/Jagdgeschwader 77 (JG 77—77th Fighter Wing) was a Zerstörer (Z—heavy fighter or destroyer) Staffel (squadron) flying the twin-engine, up to three-seat, Messerschmitt Bf 110. (Note: For an explanation of Luftwaffe unit designations, see Organization of the Luftwaffe during World War II.) The unit was stationed in Norway, operating in the Murmansk area in support of Finnish operations against the Soviet Union during the Continuation War. Germany regarded its operations in the region as part of its overall war efforts on the Eastern Front, and it provided Finland with critical material support and military cooperation. There he flew his first combat mission of the war on 13 September 1941.

=== War on the Arctic Front ===
Weissenberger claimed his first aerial victory, a Polikarpov I-153 biplane fighter, on 24 October 1941 and was awarded the Iron Cross 2nd Class (Eisernes Kreuz zweiter Klasse) on 6 November 1941. He was promoted to Oberfeldwebel of the Reserves on 1 February 1942. During this phase of his military career, he often got into trouble with his superiors regarding his lack of discipline. A few times his comrades had to intervene to save him from punishment. On 24 January 1942, Weissenberger and Oberleutnant Max Franzisket flew on a ground attack mission against the Kirov Railway line. (Note: Max Franzisket was the brother of Ludwig Franzisket. Franzisket was a recipient of the German Cross in Gold and was killed in action on 19 July 1943 on the Eastern Front.) Weissenberger claimed a Polikarpov I-18 shot down at 13:35, roughly 4 kilometers (2.5 miles) northwest of the railway station of Bojaskoje. At 13:40, he claimed a Hawker Hurricane shot down, his third aerial victory.

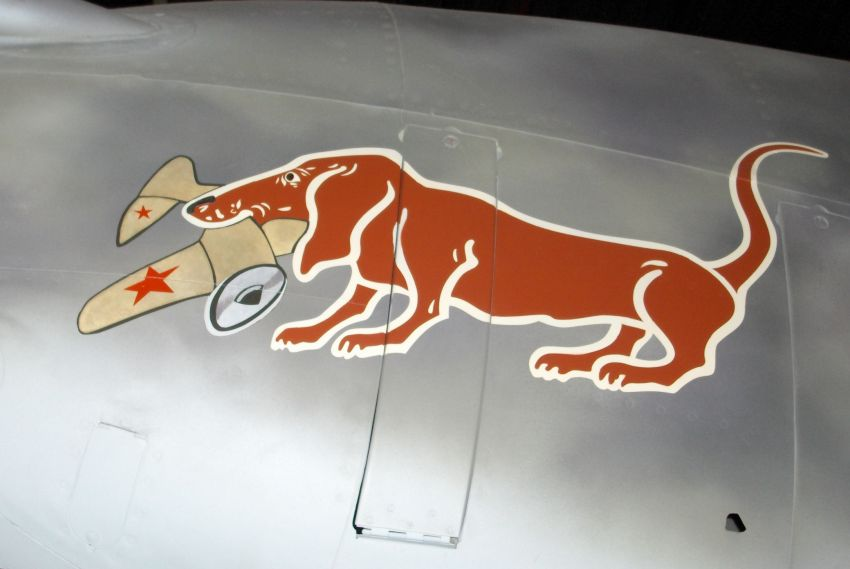
10.(Z)/JG 5 was referred to as the "Dackelstaffel". The Bf 110s noseart emblem was a dachshund biting a Polikarpov I-16.

In February 1942 he mostly flew escort fighter missions for Junkers Ju 87 and Ju 88 bombers attacking the harbors at Ferosero, Polyarnoye, present-day Polyarny, and Murmansk. Weissenberger received the Iron Cross 1st Class (Eisernes Kreuz erster Klasse) on 17 February 1942. On 25 February he claimed two more Hurricanes shot down at 11:15 and 11:22, his fourth and fifth victories. His Staffel was redesignated as 10.(Z) of Jagdgeschwader 5 (JG 5—5th Fighter Wing) on 16 March 1942 and subordinated to JG 5. In April 1942 he claimed eight victories, three of which were shot down on 15 April during two combat missions west of Murmansk. On 25 April at 07:20 Weissenberger took off at Kirkenes for an emergency intercept mission against 20 Soviet Petlyakov Pe-2 bombers. He shot down two bombers before his aircraft was hit by the defensive fire. The right engine started burning and he was forced to disengage from the enemy. Returning to the German lines, he made a safe belly landing.

Weissenberger became an "ace-in-a-day" for the first time on 10 May 1942 when he shot down five enemy aircraft, aerial victories 14–18, between 16:45 and 16:57 while on a Ju 87 escort mission. These victories were claimed over aircraft of 2 Gvardeyskiy Smeshannyy Aviatsionny Polk (2 GSAP—2nd Soviet Guards Composite Aviation Division), which lost ten Hurricanes destroyed and three damaged. He claimed his 20th victory on 15 May when he shot down a Hurricane 4 km (2.5 mi) west of Murmansk. In June 1942, JG 5 was augmented by another group, VI. Gruppe (4th Group) under the command of Hauptmann Hans Kriegel. This led to a number of Staffel redesignations. Weissenberger's 10.(Z) Staffel was renamed as 13.(Z) Staffel and remained subordinated to JG 5. He transferred from the reserve force to active service and was promoted to Leutnant (second lieutenant) on 1 July 1942. In early September he was transferred to 6. Staffel of JG 5, now flying the single-engine, single-seat, Messerschmitt Bf 109 fighter. By this date, Weissenberger, as a Zerstörer pilot, had claimed 23 aerial victories in addition to 15 locomotives, 2 FLAK installations, a radio station, a railway station and other ground targets destroyed and was awarded the German Cross in Gold (Deutsches Kreuz in Gold) on 8 September 1942.

=== Knight's Cross of the Iron Cross ===
At the time, 6. Staffel at the time was based in Petsamo, present-day Pechenga in Murmansk Oblast, Russia. Weissenberger took off on his first Bf 109 combat mission at 14:00 on 15 September 1942 after he had spent a few days familiarizing himself with the single-engine fighter aircraft. The mission, flown by 10 Bf 109 fighters from 6. Staffel, was a combat air patrol in the vicinity of Murmashi. The flight encountered enemy aircraft and Weissenberger filed claims over two Curtiss P-40 Warhawk Lend-Lease fighters shot down at 14:31 and 14:33. These were his first victories claimed on the Bf 109, taking his total to 25 victories. A week later, on 22 September, Weissenberger and 6. Staffel were again patrolling the airspace near the Soviet airfield at Murmashi. During this mission, he claimed three more aerial victories, over Hurricanes shot down between 14:59 and 15:05.

On 27 September 1942, Weissenberger claimed five victories during the course of two combat missions. During the first mission, he shot down a Bell P-39 Airacobra at 11:36. On his second mission, which began at 15:00, he encountered a formation of roughly 30 aircraft, claiming four Hurricanes shot down from 15:49 to 15:56, a time space of seven minutes. This "ace-in-a-day" achievement took his total to 33 aerial victories. On 22 October 1942, Weissenberger was tasked with fighter protection for a reconnaissance aircraft. The engine of his Bf 109 F-4 seized up just west of Murmansk. He managed to nurse his aircraft back to the German lines before bailing out. He was picked up eight hours later by a Gebirgsjäger (mountain infantry) patrol and brought back to his Staffel. Following this event he was given one week of rest. He returned to combat on 30 October 1942, and during two combat missions again achieved "ace-in-a-day" status. He claimed three victories on his first mission and two P-40s at 15:00 and 15:06 on his second mission of the day. This took his total to 38 aerial victories and he was honored with the presentation of the Knight's Cross of the Iron Cross (Ritterkreuz des Eisernen Kreuzes) on 13 November 1942. That day, Feldwebel Heinrich Bartels from 8. Staffel of JG 5 was also awarded the Knight's Cross.

Following the winter break, Weissenberger claimed 33 further victories between 6–28 March 1943. Often he achieved multiple victories per day; six claims on 10 March, victories 43 to 48 on 10 March, victories 49 to 53 on 12 March, and numbers 54 to 57 on 13 March. A ground attack mission against the airfield at Salmiyarvi on 28 March was his last action of the month. Weissenberger claimed three P-39s shot down during this mission, but was himself hit by anti-aircraft fire and had to make a forced landing in his Bf 109 G-2 (Werknummer 13912—factory number). He was picked up and returned by a Fiesler Fi 156 "Storch". On 13 April 1943, a flight of five aircraft from 6. Staffel claimed 18 Soviet aircraft destroyed without loss. Six of the enemy aircraft were credited to Weissenberger, shot down between 17:05 and 17:16. This took his score to 77 aerial victories. On 13 May, he claimed four P-39s destroyed, representing victories 83 to 86, and he was promoted to Oberleutnant on 1 June 1943.

=== Oak Leaves to the Knight's Cross ===
Weissenberger claimed another five victories on 8 June 1943 north of Murmansk between 17:15 and 17:23. This brought his score to 91 aerial victories and on 15 June he was appointed Staffelkapitän (squadron leader) of 7. Staffel of JG 5. In the period 15 June to 4 July, 7. Staffel claimed 122 aerial victories under his leadership. The heaviest fighting occurred on 22 June over the Karelia Front, during which his Staffel claimed 13 victories, of which three were Hurricanes shot down by Weissenberger. A day later, he again claimed three aircraft shot down, comprising victories 95 to 97. At the time, August Mors was his regular wingman.

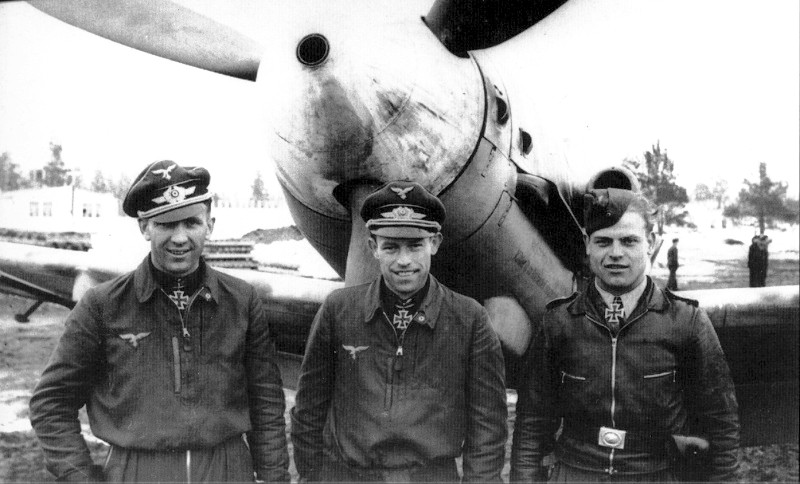
Weissenberger (left), Heinrich Ehrler (center) and Rudolf Müller (right)

On 4 July 1943, Weissenberger led 7. Staffel to 16 aerial victories, while providing fighter cover for a departing German naval task force. First, Weissenberger claimed a Pe-2 reconnaissance aircraft shot down at 21:07. A flight of 25 to 30 enemy bombers and torpedo bombers was then spotted at 21:50. Weissenberger claimed an Ilyushin Il-2 "Sturmovik" at 21:54, his 100th aerial victory. He was the 43rd Luftwaffe pilot to achieve the century mark. The Staffel returned to its airfield at 22:19 without having sustained any losses during the encounter. Weissenberger alone had claimed seven victories during this mission, taking his total to 104 victories.

He achieved "ace-in-a-day" status for the fourth time on 25 July 1943, claiming aerial victories numbers 108 to 112. Following his 112th victory, he was awarded the Knight's Cross of the Iron Cross with Oak Leaves (Ritterkreuz des Eisernen Kreuzes mit Eichenlaub) on 2 August 1943, the 266th member of the Wehrmacht to be so honored. The presentation was made by Adolf Hitler at the Wolf's Lair, Hitler's headquarters in Rastenburg, present-day Kętrzyn in Poland. Five other Luftwaffe officers were presented with awards that day by Hitler, Hauptmann Egmont Prinz zur Lippe-Weißenfeld, Hauptmann Manfred Meurer, Hauptmann Heinrich Ehrler, Oberleutnant Joachim Kirschner, Hauptmann Werner Schröer were also awarded the Oak Leaves, and Major Helmut Lent received the Swords to his Knight's Cross with Oak Leaves.

Weissenberger was placed in command of 6. Staffel on 14 September 1943 and in October and November added five more victories to his score, four of which were achieved on 3 November over the Rybachy Peninsula. Later in November 1943, II. Gruppe (2nd Group) was ordered to relocate further south to the front near Nevel, Leningrad and Lake Ilmen. Relocating from Pskov, 6. Staffel arrived at their new airfield at Idritsa on 11 November 1943 and was in action again on 17 November. In January 1944, II. Gruppe was subordinated to Luftflotte 2 (2nd Air Fleet) in the middle sector of the Eastern Front in support of the defensive battles at Vitebsk. The Staffel flew combat missions from Orsha and Polotsk. Between 10:50 to 10:58 on 1 February 1944, Weissenberger achieved his fifth "ace-in-a-day", taking his total to 124. On 28 February, he claimed his 140th aerial victory.

At the end of February 1944, II. Gruppe relocated again to Polotsk and then to Jakobstadt, present-day Jēkabpils in Latvia, and on 16 March Weissenberger claimed his 141st victory. Among his four victories claimed on 20 March were three Il-2 ground attack aircraft. On 25 March 1944, another "ace-in-a-day" achievement saw his total increase to 153 aerial victories. In late March 1944, II. Gruppe was transferred to the far north again, and was based at Alakurtti. Here they defended against the Vyborg–Petrozavodsk Offensive.

Weissenberger was appointed Gruppenkommandeur (group commander) of II. Gruppe of JG 5 on 26 March 1944, succeeding Hauptmann Horst Carganico who was transferred. Command of 6. Staffel was passed to Oberleutnant Ernst Scheufele. He claimed three aircraft shot down on 4 April, and four more on 9 April, taking his victories from 159 to 162. At the end of April 1944, II. Gruppe relocated to Jakobstadt, withdrawing from the Arctic Front for the last time. On 17 May he claimed victories 169 to 172, and the next day shot down three Yakovlev Yak-9s, taking his total to 175. These were his last victories on the Eastern Front. At the end of May 1944, II. Gruppe was transferred to Defense of the Reich duties and was relocated to Gardelegen Airfield in Germany.

=== Combat on the Western Front ===
Weissenberger was promoted to Hauptmann on 1 June 1944. On 3 June, he arrived in Herzogenaurach to take over command of I. Gruppe (1st Group) of JG 5. The former Gruppenkommandeur Major Horst Carganico had been killed in a flying accident on 27 May 1944. Command of his II. Gruppe of JG 5 was passed to Oberleutnant Hans Tetzner. Three days after Weissenberger took command, the Allied invasion of Normandy began. To counter the invasion, elements of I./JG 5 were transported to France by train that afternoon. The ground personnel were flown on Junkers Ju 52s to their airfield at Montdidier, 35 km (22 mi) south of Amiens. The following day, Weissenberger took I. Gruppe into combat, achieving "ace-in-a-day" status once again on his first day of combat on the Western Front. His 176th victory was over a Republic P-47 Thunderbolt shot down at 09:05. He claimed two further P-47s shot down 20 minutes later. I. Gruppe was scrambled again in the afternoon which resulted in aerial combat with roughly 12 P-47s near Beauvais. During the course of this encounter, which ended at 17:39, Weissenberger claimed two P-47s shot down.

On 8 June the final elements of I. Gruppe arrived in Montdidier, making the unit complete. In the evening Weissenberger again claimed two P-47s shot down, his 181st and 182nd aerial victories. The airfield at Montdidier came under heavy fighter bomber attack on 11 June followed by another attack on 12 June resulting in significant damage to the airfield. On 12 June Weissenberger filed a claim for three aerial victories. Together with his wingman, Unteroffizier (Sergeant) Alfred Tichy, he took off at 06:00 and during the course of 12 minutes shot down three P-47s. After his first victory, Tichy was killed in action, crashing near Évreux. At 07:02 Weissenberger shot down his third P-47 of the day but his Bf 109 G-5 (Werknummer 110256) was hit in the engine forcing him to bail out near Saint André. The airfield in Montdidier was rendered unserviceable and I. Gruppe was forced to relocate. It was first moved to Péronne, then to Chauny, a makeshift airfield between Noyon and Tergnier. The constant attacks against German airfields forced another move in July 1944, this time to Frières in the vicinity of Laon.

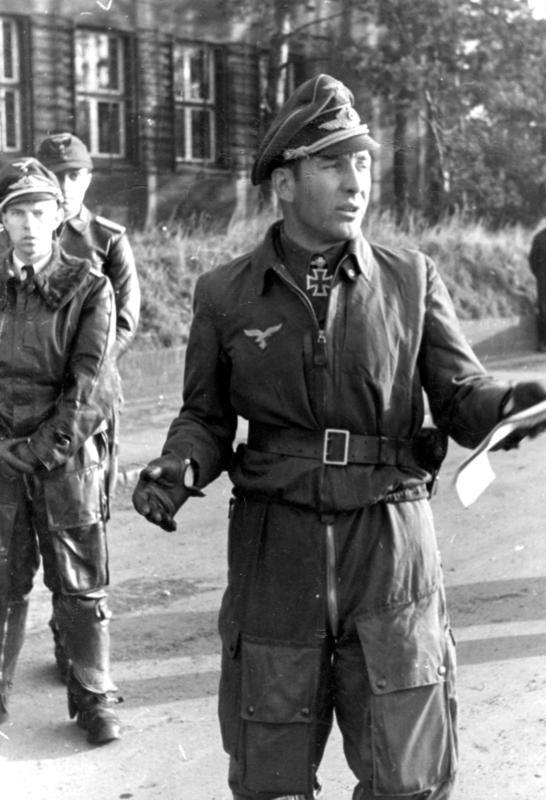
Weissenberger on 4 October 1944

II. Gruppe flew a combat air patrol on 6 July 1944, resulting in the claim of three Lockheed P-38 Lightnings destroyed. Weissenberger was credited with two of these victories, the first at 08:48 and the second at 08:49, both shot down south of Cambrai. The next day, the Gruppe took off heading for the airspace south of Rosières where they engaged a formation of 15 to 20 P-47s. During this encounter, Weissenberger claimed three victories, numbers 188 to 190. The Gruppe was given a few days of rest and on 13 July were ordered to operate against enemy fighter bombers attacking German positions in the area Rouen – Bernay – Évreux. During this mission, he shot down a Hawker Typhoon at 18:24 near Trouville and another one two minutes later. They were then tasked with a fighter bomber mission on 14 July, attacking enemy positions near Caen. After a number of ground strafing attacks they themselves came under attack of numerous Supermarine Spitfires and P-47s. Flying at a height of 10 meters (33 feet), Weissenberger managed to shoot down one Spitfire 5 km (3.1 mi) south of Bayeux.

The commanding general of II. Jagdkorps (2nd Fighter Corps), Generalleutnant Alfred Bülowius, accompanied by Oberstleutnant Herbert Ihlefeld inspected II. Gruppe at their airfield in Frières on 15 July 1944. On 17 July, Weissenberger led his Gruppe on a number of missions in the combat area near Caen without encountering any enemy aircraft. On their last mission of the day, having taken off at 19:00, they encountered enemy fighter bombers near Caen – Le Mesnil. During aerial combat, the Gruppe lost three pilots without any success for themselves. On 19 July 1944, I. Gruppe was tasked with flying top cover for Jagdgeschwader 2 "Richthofen" and Jagdgeschwader 26 "Schlageter". During this mission, Weissenberger claimed four aerial victories. At 20:22 he shot down his first Typhoon of the mission north of Lisieux, another Typhoon one minute later and his third at 20:25 northwest of Cormeilles. His fourth victory was over a North American P-51 Mustang, shot down at 20:35 near Charleval.

On 25 July 1944, the Gruppe was again tasked with a combat air patrol mission in the greater Caen area. Weissenberger received the order to take off at 10:30 and at 11:00 they spotted Spitfires in the vicinity of Rouen. In the ensuing aerial encounter at an altitude of 3,800 m (12,500 ft), Weissenberger shot down a Spitfire 15 km (9.3 mi) south of Rouen. This was his 199th aerial victory. Two minutes later, at 11:02, he shot down his 200th opponent. Weissenberger left the Gruppe on 30 July 1944 and went on vacation to Bad Wiessee.

His I. Gruppe was withdrawn from combat and moved to Wunstorf for a period of rest and conversion training to the Bf 109 G-14. The ground personnel were transferred to II. Gruppe of Jagdgeschwader 6 (JG 6—6th Fighter Wing). Conversion training ended in October 1944 and I. Gruppe was disbanded shortly after and became III. Gruppe (3rd Group) of JG 6 on 14 October. On 23 November 1944, Weissenberger was transferred and ordered to Kaltenkirchen. At Kaltenkirchen, he was given command on 25 November of the newly forming I. Gruppe of Jagdgeschwader 7 "Nowotny" (JG 7—7th Fighter Wing). Command of III. Gruppe of JG 6 was given to Major Helmut Kühle.

=== Flying the Messerschmitt Me 262 ===
JG 7 "Nowotny" was the first operational jet fighter wing in the world and was named after Walter Nowotny, who was killed in action on 8 November 1944. Nowotny, a fighter pilot credited with 258 aerial victories and recipient of the Knight's Cross of the Iron Cross with Oak Leaves, Swords and Diamonds (Ritterkreuz des Eisernen Kreuzes mit Eichenlaub, Schwertern und Brillanten), had been assessing the Messerschmitt Me 262 jet aircraft under operational conditions. JG 7 "Nowotny" was equipped with the Me 262, an aircraft which was heavily armed and faster than any Allied fighter. General der Jagdflieger (General of the Fighter Force) Adolf Galland hoped that the Me 262 would compensate for the Allies' numerical superiority. On 12 November 1944, the Oberkommando der Luftwaffe (OKL—Air Force High Command) ordered JG 7 "Nowotny" to be equipped with the Me 262. Galland appointed Oberst Johannes Steinhoff as its first Geschwaderkommodore (wing commander).

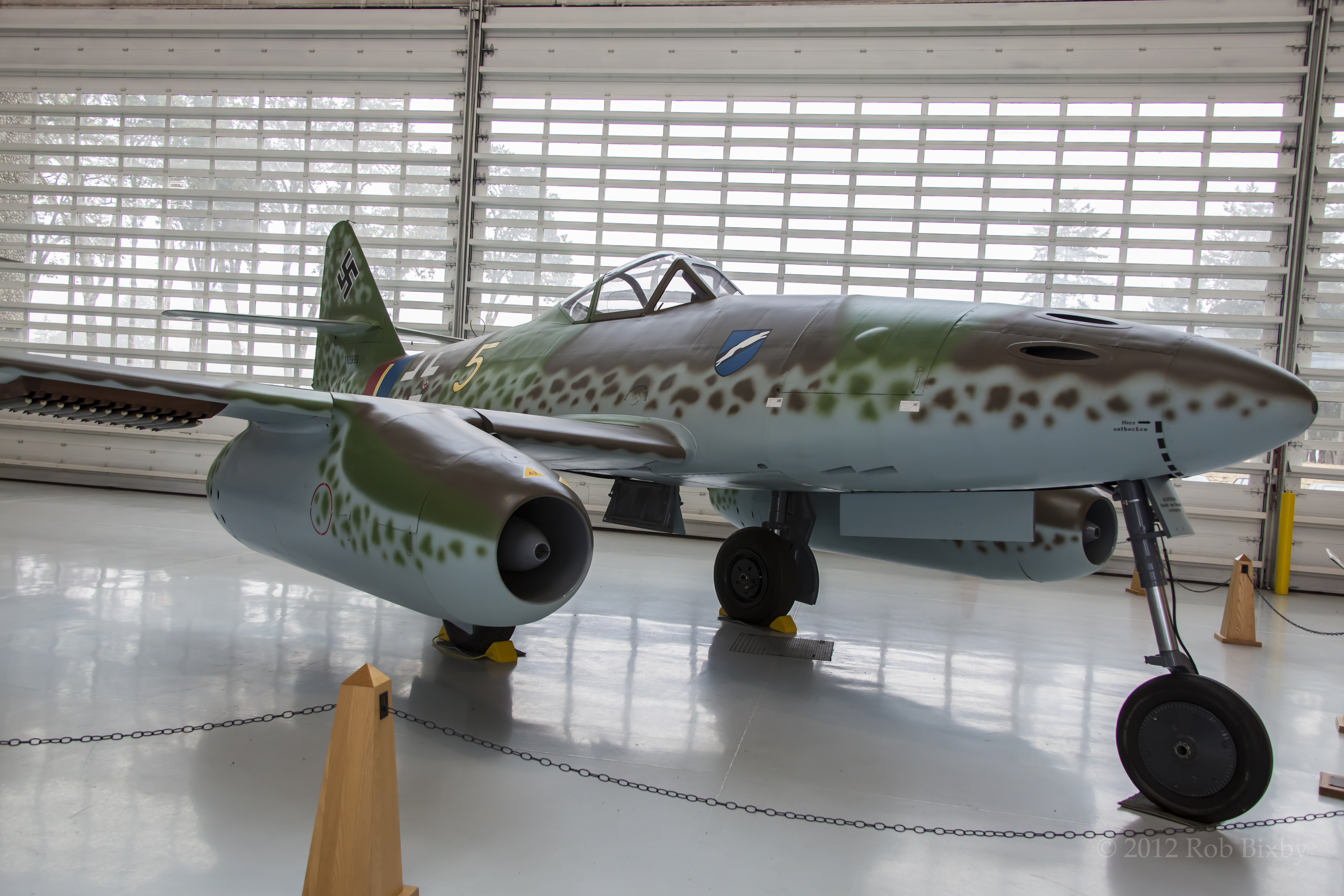
A Me 262 of JG 7 similar to those flown by Weissenberger on display at the Evergreen Aviation & Space Museum.

JG 7 "Nowotny" was initially formed with the Stab (headquarters unit) and III. Gruppe at Brandenburg-Briest from the remnants of Kommando Nowotny. I. Gruppe was created on 27 November from pilots and personnel from II. Gruppe of Jagdgeschwader 3 "Udet" (JG 3—3rd Fighter Wing) and placed under the command of Weissenberger. Weissenberger's appointed Staffelkapitäne in I. Gruppe were Oberleutnant Hans Grünberg, Oberleutnant Fritz Stehle, and Oberleutnant Hans Waldmann, commanding 1.–3. Staffel respectively.

On New Year's Day 1945, Weissenberger married his teenage-love Cilly Vogel in Langenselbold near Hanau. Best man at his wedding was his former JG 5 comrade and friend Walter Schuck. Schuck succeeded Waldmann as Staffelkapitän of the 3. Staffel following the latter's death in a flying accident on 18 March 1945. Weissenberger was promoted to Major on 1 January 1945 and replaced Steinhoff as Geschwaderkommodore of JG 7 "Nowotny" shortly after. Both Galland and Steinhoff, among others, were relieved of their commands in the aftermath of the Fighter Pilots' Revolt in early 1945. Consequently, command of I. Gruppe of JG 7 was passed to Major Erich Rudorffer on 14 January.

Under his command, JG 7 "Nowotny" achieved some success before the end of World War II in Europe on 8 May 1945. On 18 March 1945, JG 7 "Nowotny" claimed 25 aerial victories over Berlin, among them three Boeing B-17 Flying Fortresses shot down by Weissenberger. (Note: For a list of Luftwaffe jet aces see list of German World War II jet aces.) On 4 April, the United States Army Air Forces (USAAF) Eighth Air Force dispatched 1,431 heavy bombers, escorted by 850 fighter aircraft, to northern Germany. The bombers targets included the harbor and residential areas of Kiel and Hamburg and five Luftwaffe airfields, including Parchim Airfield where III. Gruppe of JG 7 was based. Defending against this attack, Weissenberger shot down a B-17 bomber near Bremen, his last claim. Over all, he achieved eight confirmed victories, seven B-17 bombers and a P-51 fighter, while flying the Me 262. Weissenberger survived the war and was credited with a total of 208 aerial victories, including 33 over the Western Front, claimed in 375 combat missions. (Note: According to Obermaier, Weissenberger flew more than 500 combat missions.)

== Later life ==
The Nürburgring circuit. Weissenberger's accident occurred in the vicinity of Metzgesfeld (upper left corner).

Weissenberger became a motor racing driver after the war, and was killed at the Nürburgring circuit on 11 June 1950, when his modified BMW 328 single seater (Veritas), start number 15, crashed on the first lap of the XV Eifelrennen, a Formula Three motor race. (Note: For a list of fatal accidents on the Nürburgring see list of Nürburgring fatalities.)

== Summary of career ==
=== Aerial victory claims ===
According to US historian David T. Zabecki, Weissenberger was credited with 208 aerial victories. Spick also lists him with 208 aerial victories, claimed in over 500 combat missions and a mission-to-claim ratio of 2.40. Mathews and Foreman, authors of Luftwaffe Aces — Biographies and Victory Claims, researched the German Federal Archives and found records for 208 aerial victory claims, plus two further unconfirmed claims. This figure of confirmed claims includes 175 aerial victories on the Eastern Front and 33 on the Western Front, including seven four-engined bombers and 8 victories with the Me 262 jet fighter.

Victory claims were logged to a map-reference (PQ = Planquadrat), for example "PQ 36 Ost 3914". The Luftwaffe grid map (Jägermeldenetz) covered all of Europe, western Russia and North Africa and was composed of rectangles measuring 15 minutes of latitude by 30 minutes of longitude, an area of about 360 square miles (930 km^{2}). These sectors were then subdivided into 36 smaller units to give a location area 3 km × 4 km (1.9 mi × 2.5 mi) in size.

Chronicle of aerial victories
This and the ♠ (Ace of spades) indicates those aerial victories which made Weissenberger an "ace-in-a-day", a term which designates a fighter pilot who has shot down five or more airplanes in a single day. This and the – (dash) indicates unconfirmed aerial victory claims for which Weissenberger did not receive credit. This and the ? (question mark) indicates information discrepancies listed by Prien, Stemmer, Rodeike, Balke, Bock, Mombeek, Mathews, and Foreman.
Claim	Date	Time	Type	Location	Claim	Date	Time	Type	Location
– 6(Z). Staffel of Jagdgeschwader 77 –
1	24 October 1941	12:35	I-153	40 km (25 mi) southeast of Liza	4	25 February 1942	11:15	Hurricane	south of Grasmaja-Guba
2	24 January 1942	13:35	I-18 (MiG-1)	4 km (2.5 mi) northeast of Bojarskoje	5	25 February 1942	11:22	Hurricane	north of Rutschij railroad
3	24 January 1942	13:40	Hurricane	6 km (3.7 mi) southeast of Topornij					
– 10(Z). Staffel of Jagdgeschwader 5 –
6	8 April 1942	15:20	MiG-3	north of Restikent	14♠	10 May 1942	16:45	MiG-3	10 km (6.2 mi) south of Vayda-Guba
7	12 April 1942	07:11	LaGG-3	Lake Wilj, west of Liza Bight	15♠	10 May 1942	16:46	MiG-3	18 km (11 mi) southeast of Vayda-Guba
8	15 April 1942	13:18	I-180 (Yak-7)	10 km (6.2 mi) west of Murmansk	16♠	10 May 1942	16:48	Hurricane	northeastern corner of Liza Bight
9	15 April 1942	17:42	MiG-3	20 km (12 mi) west of Murmansk	17♠	10 May 1942	16:50	Hurricane	Witschanja Bight
10	15 April 1942	17:45	Hurricane	20 km (12 mi) west of Murmansk	18♠	10 May 1942	16:57	MiG-3	8 km (5.0 mi) south of Vladimir
11	23 April 1942	06:25	Hurricane	east of Titowka	19	12 May 1942	08:15	MiG-3	southeast of Liza Estuary
12	25 April 1942	07:44	Pe-2	10 km (6.2 mi) south of Motovski	20	15 May 1942	18:12	Hurricane	20 km (12 mi) west of Murmansk
13	25 April 1942	07:49	Pe-2	35 km (22 mi) south of Motovski	21	1 June 1942	15:34	P-40	southwest of Murmansk
—	25 April 1942	—	Pe-2	Motovski					
– 13(Z). Staffel of Jagdgeschwader 5 –
22	14 August 1942	13:24	MiG-3	east of Lake Wesnj	23	8 September 1942	15:02	Yak-1	Centre of Lake Njal
– 6. Staffel of Jagdgeschwader 5 –
24	15 September 1942	14:31	P-40	16 km (9.9 mi) south of Murmashi	58	14 March 1943	14:05	P-39	west of Lake Urd
25	15 September 1942	14:33	P-40	15 km (9.3 mi) southeast of Murmashi	59	14 March 1943	14:08	P-39	west of Lake Urd
26	22 September 1942	14:59	Hurricane	west of Murmashi; 4 km (2.5 mi) west of Murmashi	60	14 March 1943	14:11	P-39	east of Lake Urd
27	22 September 1942	15:00	Hurricane	north of Murmashi; 3 km (1.9 mi) north of Murmashi	61	20 March 1943	11:20	P-40	Murmashi south of Murmashi
28	22 September 1942	15:05	P-40	south of Murmashi; 2 km (1.2 mi) south of Murmashi	62	20 March 1943	11:24	P-40	7 km (4.3 mi) southeast of Murmashi
29♠	27 September 1942	11:36	P-39	20 km (12 mi) northeast of Murmansk	63	20 March 1943	11:30	P-40	4 km (2.5 mi) east of Murmashi; 4 km (2.5 mi) west of Shonguy
30♠	27 September 1942	15:49	Hurricane	south of Shonguy; 6 km (3.7 mi) south of Shonguy	64	21 March 1943	09:02	Il-2	Murmashi south of Murmashi
31♠	27 September 1942	15:50	Hurricane	southwest of Shonguy; 9 km (5.6 mi) southwest of Shonguy	65	27 March 1943	13:58	P-39	4 km (2.5 mi) west of Shonguy
32♠	27 September 1942	15:51	Hurricane	south of Shonguy; 9 km (5.6 mi) south of Shonguy	66	27 March 1943	13:59	P-39	8 km (5.0 mi) southwest of Murmashi
33♠	27 September 1942	15:56	Hurricane	east of Shonguy; 8 km (5.0 mi) east of Shonguy	67	27 March 1943	14:02	P-40	12 km (7.5 mi) west of Murmashi
34♠	30 October 1942	12:10	P-40	21 km (13 mi) northeast of Murmansk	68	27 March 1943	14:06	P-40	11 km (6.8 mi) west of Murmashi
35♠	30 October 1942	12:20	P-40	northeast of Murmansk; 23 km (14 mi) northeast of Murmansk	69	28 March 1943	11:50	P-39	30 km (19 mi) southeast of Salmiyarvi
36♠	30 October 1942	12:25	LaGG-3	southeast of Vayenga; 6 km (3.7 mi) southwest of Spaenga; Near Murmashi	70	28 March 1943	11:58	P-39	45 km (28 mi) west of Murmansk
37♠	30 October 1942	15:00	P-40	northeast of Murmansk; 8 km (5.0 mi) northeast of Murmansk; Near Murmashi	71	28 March 1943	12:00	P-39	33 km (21 mi) northwest of Murmashi
38♠	30 October 1942	15:06	P-40	southeast of Vayenga; 12 km (7.5 mi) northeast of Spaenga; Near Murmashi	72♠	13 April 1943	17:05	Hurricane	12 km (7.5 mi) northeast of Murmansk
39	6 March 1943	10:10	LaGG-3	south of Uschmana; Kjem-Uschmana	73♠	13 April 1943	17:06	Hurricane	14 km (8.7 mi) northeast of Murmansk
40	6 March 1943	13:08	P-40	northeast of Uschmana; Kjem-Uschmana	74♠	13 April 1943	17:13	P-39	17 km (11 mi) northeast of Murmansk
41	6 March 1943	13:11	P-40	northeast of Uschmana; Kjem-Uschmana	75♠	13 April 1943	17:14	P-39	11 km (6.8 mi) northeast of Murmansk
42	6 March 1943	13:16	P-40	northeast of Uschmana; Kjem-Uschmana	76♠	13 April 1943	17:15	P-39	14 km (8.7 mi) east of Murmansk
43♠	10 March 1943	09:59	P-40	20 km (12 mi) southeast of Murmansk; 20 km (12 mi) southeast of Murmashi	77♠	13 April 1943	17:16	P-39	21 km (13 mi) northeast of Murmansk
44♠	10 March 1943	10:00	P-40	32 km (20 mi) southeast of Murmansk; 32 km (20 mi) southeast of Murmashi	78	19 April 1943	11:24	P-39	24 km (15 mi) northeast of Murmansk
45♠	10 March 1943	10:06	P-40	31 km (19 mi) southeast of Murmansk; 31 km (19 mi) southeast of Murmashi	79	22 April 1943	12:57	P-40	6 km (3.7 mi) west of Murmansk; 4 km (2.5 mi) north of Murmashi
46♠	10 March 1943	10:07	P-39	37 km (23 mi) southeast of Murmansk; 37 km (23 mi) southeast of Murmashi	80	22 April 1943	13:10	Yak-1	7 km (4.3 mi) east of Murmansk; 11 km (6.8 mi) southeast of Murmashi
47♠	10 March 1943	10:08	P-39	43 km (27 mi) southeast of Murmansk; 43 km (27 mi) southeast of Murmashi	81	22 April 1943	13:12	Yak-1	4 km (2.5 mi) north of Kola; 8 km (5.0 mi) southeast of Murmashi
48♠	10 March 1943	10:09	P-40	45 km (28 mi) southeast of Murmansk; 45 km (28 mi) southeast of Murmashi	82	11 May 1943	16:30	P-40	7 km (4.3 mi) southeast of Murmashi
49♠	12 March 1943	14:17	P-40	20 km (12 mi) southeast of Murmashi	83	13 May 1943	05:05	P-39	9 km (5.6 mi) north of Cape Pogan
50♠	12 March 1943	14:18	P-40	15 km (9.3 mi) south of Murmashi	84	13 May 1943	05:07	P-39	10 km (6.2 mi) east of Cape Pogan
51♠	12 March 1943	14:19	P-39	16 km (9.9 mi) south of Murmashi	85	13 May 1943	05:08	P-39	2 km (1.2 mi) northeast of Cape Pogan
52♠	12 March 1943	14:32	P-39	20 km (12 mi) southeast of Murmashi	86	13 May 1943	05:14	P-39	16 km (9.9 mi) northwest of Cape Pogan
53♠	12 March 1943	14:35	P-39	19 km (12 mi) south of Murmashi	87♠	8 June 1943	17:15	Typhoon	21 km (13 mi) northeast of Murmansk
54	13 March 1943	09:35	Pe-2	17 km (11 mi) east of Pechenga airfield 17 km (11 mi) east of Pechenga	88♠	8 June 1943	17:16	Typhoon	22 km (14 mi) northeast of Murmansk
55	13 March 1943	09:36	Pe-2	25 km (16 mi) east of Pechenga airfield 25 km (16 mi) east of Pechenga	89♠	8 June 1943	17:18	Typhoon	20 km (12 mi) northeast of Murmansk
56	13 March 1943	13:05	P-40	13 km (8.1 mi) southeast of Ura-Guba	90♠	8 June 1943	17:21	P-39	23 km (14 mi) northeast of Murmansk
57	13 March 1943	13:08	P-40	southern edge of Ura-Guba	91♠	8 June 1943	17:23	Typhoon	27 km (17 mi) northeast of Murmansk
– 7. Staffel of Jagdgeschwader 5 –
92	22 June 1943	09:27	Hurricane	PQ 36 Ost 3914, 3 km (1.9 mi) east of Kola; 3 km (1.9 mi) east of Kola railroad	103♠	4 July 1943	22:04	Hampden	PQ 37 Ost 1024, 10 km (6.2 mi) northwest of Pummanki
93	22 June 1943	09:30	Hurricane	PQ 36 Ost 3915, 6 km (3.7 mi) northeast of Kola; 6 km (3.7 mi) northeast of Kola railroad	104♠	4 July 1943	22:06	Hampden	PQ 37 Ost 1025, 12 km (7.5 mi) northwest of Pummanki
94	22 June 1943	09:40	Hurricane	PQ 36 Ost 3914, 2 km (1.2 mi) east of Kola; 2 km (1.2 mi) east of Kola railroad	105	18 July 1943	00:25	P-39	PQ 37 Ost 5434, 30 km (19 mi) east of Cape Zyp Nowolok (Note: Cape Zyp Nowolok is the easternmost point on the Rybachy Peninsula.); 28 km (17 mi) east of Zyp Nowolok
95	23 June 1943	07:06	P-39	PQ 37 Ost 0277, 55 km (34 mi) north of Makur; 50 km (31 mi) north of Makur	106	18 July 1943	00:28	P-39	PQ 37 Ost 5434, 30 km (19 mi) east of Cape Zyp Nowolok; 30 km (19 mi) southeast of Zyp Nowolok
96	23 June 1943	07:07	P-39	PQ 37 Ost 0275, 55 km (34 mi) north of Makur	107	24 July 1943	15:55	Hurricane	8 km (5.0 mi) east of Kildinskoje
97	23 June 1943	07:12	P-39	PQ 37 Ost 0271, 60 km (37 mi) north of Makur	108♠	25 July 1943	02:42	P-39	PQ 37 Ost QC 2, 12 km (7.5 mi) south of Kiberg
98♠	4 July 1943	21:07	Pe-2	PQ 37 Ost 2177, 18 km (11 mi) north of Vayda-Guba	109♠	25 July 1943	02:50	Pe-2	15 km (9.3 mi) southeast of Kiberg
99♠	4 July 1943	21:53	Il-2	PQ 37 Ost 1021, northwest of Rybachy Peninsula northwest of Poluostrov Rybači	110♠	25 July 1943	02:51	Pe-2	18 km (11 mi) southeast of Kiberg
100♠	4 July 1943	21:54	Il-2	PQ 37 Ost 1022, northwest of Rybachy Peninsula northwest of Poluostrov Rybači	111♠	25 July 1943	02:52	Pe-2	PQ 37 Ost QB 6, 20 km (12 mi) south of Kiberg
101♠	4 July 1943	21:55	Il-2	PQ 37 Ost 1023, northwest of Rybachy Peninsula northwest of Poluostrov Rybači	112♠	25 July 1943	02:59	P-39	PQ 37 Ost QD 7, 35 km (22 mi) southeast of Kiberg
102♠	4 July 1943	21:59	Hampden	PQ 37 Ost 1016, 15 km (9.3 mi) northwest of Pummanki					
– 6. Staffel of Jagdgeschwader 5 –
113♠	13 October 1943	12:58	Il-2	31 km (19 mi) west-northwest of Vayda-Guba, PQ RC 22	134	18 February 1944	14:15? (Note: According to Mombeek, Mathews and Foreman claimed at 14:14.)	Yak-9	PQ 35 Ost 09683, 13 km (8.1 mi) north of Shimsk
114♠	13 October 1943	12:59	Il-2	32 km (20 mi) west-northwest of Vayda-Guba, PQ RC 25	135	18 February 1944	16:00	LaGG-3	PQ 35 Ost 09692, 17 km (11 mi) northeast of Shimsk
115♠	13 October 1943	13:01	Il-2	24 km (15 mi) west of Vayda-Guba, PQ RC 38	136	18 February 1944	16:01	LaGG-3	PQ 35 Ost 09686, 11 km (6.8 mi) northeast of Shimsk
116♠	13 October 1943	13:11	Boston	37 km (23 mi) northwest of Vayda-Guba, PQ QC 57	137	27 February 1944	12:13	Il-2	9 km (5.6 mi) southeast of Idriza
117♠	13 October 1943	13:14	Boston	31 km (19 mi) northwest of Vayda-Guba, PQ QC 91	138	27 February 1944	12:16	Il-2	15 km (9.3 mi) southeast of Idriza
118	3 November 1943	13:29	Hurricane	7 km (4.3 mi) west of Vayda-Guba, PQ RD 37	139	27 February 1944	12:25	Il-2	PQ 25 Ost 87742, 30 km (19 mi) southeast of Idriza
119	31 January 1944	14:48	La-5	PQ 35 Ost 09871, 10 km (6.2 mi) south-southeast of Soltsy; 10 km (6.2 mi) southwest of Soltsy	—	28 February 1944	08:33	Pe-2	18 km (11 mi) northeast of Pustoschka
120♠	1 February 1944	10:50	La-5	PQ 35 Ost 09587, east of Soltsy	140	29 February 1944	08:25	Pe-2	18 km (11 mi) northeast of Pustoschka
121♠	1 February 1944	10:51	La-5	PQ 35 Ost 09721, 12 km (7.5 mi) north-northwest of Soltsy	141	16 March 1944	11:53	Yak-9	5 km (3.1 mi) south of Lake Njamosero (Note: Lake Njamosero or Nyamozero is located at 66°58′00.7″N 31°27′59.9″E)
122♠	1 February 1944	10:53	La-5	PQ 35 Ost 09724, 9 km (5.6 mi) north-northwest of Soltsy	142	17 March 1944	10:31	Yak-9	south of Njamosero railway station
123♠	1 February 1944	10:56	La-5	PQ 35 Ost 09729, 7 km (4.3 mi) north of Soltsy	143	17 March 1944	10:34	Yak-9	northern edge of Lake Werchne-Iwanowa (Note: Lake Werchne-Iwanowa or Verkhneye Ivanovo is located at 66°54′07.1″N 31°38′14.6″E)
124♠	1 February 1944	10:58	La-5	PQ 35 Ost 09755, 4 km (2.5 mi) northwest of Soltsy	144	17 March 1944	13:04	Yak-9	south-southeast of Njamosero railway station
125	6 February 1944	12:17	Il-2	PQ 35 Ost 09553, 27 km (17 mi) north of Soltsy	145	20 March 1944	09:51	Il-2	8 km (5.0 mi) north-northwest of Nischnij-Wermann (Note: Lake Nischnij-Wermann or Nizhniy-Verman is located at 66°58′30.4″N 30°50′49.1″E)
126	14 February 1944	11:45	LaGG-3	PQ 26 Ost 70681, 30 km (19 mi) west-southwest of Narva	146	20 March 1944	09:53	Il-2	9 km (5.6 mi) north of Nischnij-Wermann
127	14 February 1944	11:47? (Note: According to Mombeek, Mathews and Foreman claimed at 20:47.)	LaGG-3	PQ 26 Ost 70687, 31 km (19 mi) west-southwest of Narva	147	20 March 1944	09:55	Il-2	11 km (6.8 mi) north-northeast of Nischnij-Wermann
128	14 February 1944	11:49	Il-2	PQ 26 Ost 70831, 24 km (15 mi) southwest of Narva	148	20 March 1944	10:00	P-40	1 km (0.62 mi) south of Lake Kamenonje (Note: Lake Kamenonje or Kamennoye is located at 67°03′03.6″N 31°07′42.6″E)
129	15 February 1944	12:15	unknown type? (Note: According to Mombeek, Mathews and Foreman claimed as Ilyushin Il-2.)	PQ 25 Ost 88234, 18 km (11 mi) south of Lipno	149♠	25 March 1944	09:21	Yak-9	7 km (4.3 mi) northeast of Nischnij-Wermann
130	16 February 1944	09:01? (Note: According to Mombeek, Mathews and Foreman claimed at 14:01.)	Yak-9	PQ 25 Ost 99662, 36 km (22 mi) south of Luga	150♠	25 March 1944	09:23	Yak-9	4 km (2.5 mi) south of Lake Kamenonje
131	16 February 1944	14:02	Yak-9	PQ 25 Ost 99661, 38 km (24 mi) south of Luga	151♠	25 March 1944	09:27	Yak-9	10 km (6.2 mi) southwest of Nischnij-Wermann
132	16 February 1944	14:04	Yak-9	PQ 25 Ost 99634, 40 km (25 mi) south of Luga south of Luga	152♠	25 March 1944	12:00	Yak-9	19 km (12 mi) northwest of Njamosero railway station
133	18 February 1944	14:14	Yak-9	PQ 35 Ost 09683, 15 km (9.3 mi) north of Shimsk	153♠	25 March 1944	12:03	Il-2	12 km (7.5 mi) northwest of Njamosero railway station
– Stab II. Gruppe of Jagdgeschwader 5 –
154	27 March 1944	09:17	P-39	10 km (6.2 mi) northeast of Alakurtti airfield	165	15 April 1944? (Note: According to Mombeek claimed at 15:12 on 6 April 1944.)	16:20?	Yak-9	northern edge of Lake Tolwand (Note: Lake Tolwand or Tovand is located at 66°57′47.5″N 31°12′59.3″E)
155	27 March 1944	09:19	P-39	3 km (1.9 mi) north of Nischnij-Wermann	166	16 April 1944	15:12	Yak-9	western edge of Lake Tolwand
156	4 April 1944	18:20	Yak-9	10 km (6.2 mi) northeast of Nischnij-Wermann railway station	167	15 May 1944	14:21	Yak-9	15 km (9.3 mi) southeast of Pustoshka
157	4 April 1944	18:23	Yak-9	14 km (8.7 mi) northeast of Nischnij-Wermann railway station	168	16 May 1944	05:09	Yak-9	PQ 25 Ost 88868, 42 km (26 mi) southeast of Ostrov
158	4 April 1944	18:26	Yak-9	15 km (9.3 mi) northeast of Nischnij-Wermann railway station	169	17 May 1944	11:15	Yak-9	45 km (28 mi) southwest of Ostrov
159	9 April 1944	09:55	Yak-9	11 km (6.8 mi) northwest of Nischnij-Wermann railway station	170	17 May 1944	11:37	La-5	36 km (22 mi) southwest of Ostrov
160	9 April 1944	09:57	Yak-9	7 km (4.3 mi) north of Nischnij-Wermann railway station	171	17 May 1944	15:29	Yak-9	30 km (19 mi) southwest of Opotschka
161	9 April 1944	10:08	Yak-9	11 km (6.8 mi) east of Nischnij-Wermann railway station	172	17 May 1944	15:32	Yak-9	35 km (22 mi) southwest of Opotschka
162	9 April 1944	10:12	Yak-9	west edge of Lake Ori	173	18 May 1944	08:33	Yak-9	25 km (16 mi) southwest of Ostrov
163	12 April 1944	10:25	Yak-9	8 km (5.0 mi) north of Kaprajewo railway station	174	18 May 1944	08:33	Yak-9	25 km (16 mi) southwest of Ostrov
164	12 April 1944	10:26	Yak-9	9 km (5.6 mi) northeast of Kaprajewo railway station	175	18 May 1944	08:41	Yak-9	PQ 25 Ost 88673, 17 km (11 mi) east of Ostrov
– Stab I. Gruppe of Jagdgeschwader 5 –
176♠	7 June 1944	09:05	P-47	PQ 05 Ost S/SE-5, southwest of Montdidier	189	7 July 1944	18:33	P-47	PQ 05 Ost S/RF-8/7, south of Rosières
177♠	7 June 1944	09:26	P-47	PQ 05 Ost S/SE, southwest of Montdidier	190	7 July 1944	18:36	P-47	PQ 05 Ost S/RF-8/8, south of Rosières
178♠	7 June 1944	09:27	P-47	PQ 05 Ost S/SE-9, southwest of Montdidier	191	13 July 1944	18:24	Typhoon	Trouville-sur-Mer
179♠	7 June 1944	17:10	P-47	PQ 05 Ost S/TE-9, Beauvais	192	13 July 1944	18:26	Typhoon	Trouville-sur-Mer
180♠	7 June 1944	17:12	P-47	PQ 05 Ost S/TE-7, Beauvais	193	14 July 1944	14:41	Typhoon	5 km (3.1 mi) south of Bayeux
181	8 June 1944	18:50	P-47	west of Montdidier	194	14 July 1944	14:56	Spitfire	16 km (9.9 mi) north of Lisieux
182	8 June 1944	18:54	P-47	southwest of Montdidier	195	19 July 1944	20:22	Typhoon	north of Lisieux
183	12 June 1944	06:48	P-47	west of Évreux	196	19 July 1944	20:23	Typhoon	north of Lisieux
184	12 June 1944	06:56	P-47	30 km (19 mi) east of Évreux	197	19 July 1944	20:25	P-51	Charleval
185	12 June 1944	07:02	P-47	vicinity of Gisors	198	19 July 1944	20:35	Typhoon	nordwest of Cormeilles
186	6 July 1944	08:48	P-38	7 km (4.3 mi) south of Cambrai	199	25 July 1944	11:00	Spitfire	15 km (9.3 mi) south of Rouen
187	6 July 1944	08:49	P-38	15 km (9.3 mi) south of Cambrai	200	25 July 1944	11:02	Spitfire	southwest of Rouen
188	7 July 1944	18:32	P-47	south of Rosières					
– Stab of Jagdgeschwader 7 "Nowotny" –
201	16 March 1945	14:14	P-51	northwest of Eberswalde	205	21 March 1945	09:15	B-17	northwest of Dresden
202	18 March 1945	11:09	B-17	Nauen-Rathenow-Brandenburg	206	22 March 1945	12:45	B-17	Cottbus-Bautzen-Dresden
203	18 March 1945	11:10	B-17	Nauen-Rathenow-Brandenburg	207	31 March 1945	16:00+	B-17	
204	18 March 1945	11:17	B-17	Nauen-Rathenow-Brandenburg	208	4 April 1945	09:00+	B-17	south of Bremen

=== Awards ===
Weissenberger received the following awards:

- Iron Cross (1939 variant)
  - 2nd Class (6 November 1941)
  - 1st Class (17 February 1942)
- Honor Goblet of the Luftwaffe on 1 July 1942 as Oberfeldwebel and pilot (Note: According to Obermaier on 28 May 1942.)
- German Cross in Gold on 8 September 1942 as Oberfeldwebel in the 10.(ZS)/JG 5
- Knight's Cross of the Iron Cross with Oak Leaves
  - Knight's Cross on 13 November 1942 as Leutnant (war officer) and pilot in the 6./JG 5
  - 266th Oak Leaves on 2 August 1943 as Oberleutnant (war officer) and Staffelkapitän of the 7./JG 5

Weissenberger was recommended for the Knight's Cross of the Iron Cross with Oak Leaves and Swords (Ritterkreuz des Eisernen Kreuzes mit Eichenlaub und Schwertern) by Steinhoff after his 200th aerial victory. The recommendation was received by the Oberkommando der Luftwaffe/Luftwaffenpersonalamt (OKL/LP—Air Force High Command/Air Force Staff Office) on 29 January 1945, but was declined on 20 February 1945. At the time, 240 aerial victories were required for the Swords to be awarded.

=== Dates of rank ===
1 December 1940:	Feldwebel (Technical Sergeant) of the Reserves
1 February 1942:	Oberfeldwebel (Master Sergeant) of the Reserves
1 July 1942:	Leutnant (Second Lieutenant)
1 June 1943:	Oberleutnant (First Lieutenant)
1 June 1944:	Hauptmann (Captain)
1 January 1945:	Major (Major)

== Notes ==
Military offices
Preceded by Oberstleutnant Johannes Steinhoff	Commander of Jagdgeschwader 7 Nowotny; 1 January 1945 – 8 May 1945	Succeeded by none
