= Voronyinsky =

Voronyinsky (masculine), Voronyinskaya (feminine), or Voronyinskoye (neuter) may refer to:

- Voronyinskoye Rural Community (1861–1866), a rural community of Kemsky Uyezd, Arkhangelsk Governorate, Russian Empire
- Voronyinskaya Volost (1866–1868), a volost of Kemsky Uyezd, Arkhangelsk Governorate, Russian Empire
