= Ekostrovsky =

Ekostrovsky (masculine), Ekostrovskaya (feminine), or Ekostrovskoye (neuter) may refer to:

- Ekostrovskoye Rural Community (1861–1866), a rural community of Kemsky Uyezd of Arkhangelsk Governorate, Russian Empire
- Ekostrovskaya Volost (1866–1868), a volost of Kemsky Uyezd of Arkhangelsk Governorate, Russian Empire
