= Petsamo expeditions =

Finnish attempts to annex Petsamo in 1918 and 1920

The Petsamo expeditions (Finnish: Petsamon retket, Swedish: Petsamoexpeditionerna) were two military expeditions in May 1918 and in April 1920 by Finnish civilian volunteers, to annex Petsamo (Russian: Pechenga) from Bolshevist Russia. It was one of the many "kinship wars" (Heimosodat) fought by the newly independent Finland during the Russian Civil War. Although both expeditions were unsuccessful, Petsamo was handed over by Russia to Finland in the 1920 Treaty of Tartu.

== The expeditions ==
The goal of the expedition was to take Petsamo for Finland, which had previously been promised to Finland by Tsar Alexander II in 1864, in exchange for land around the Sestra River on the Karelian Isthmus transferred to Russia to build a weapon factory. Though initially the Bolsheviks assured the Finnish government that they will honor earlier commitments over the region, they later disowned their word.

== 1918 ==
First Petsamo expedition
- Part of Heimosodat and First World War
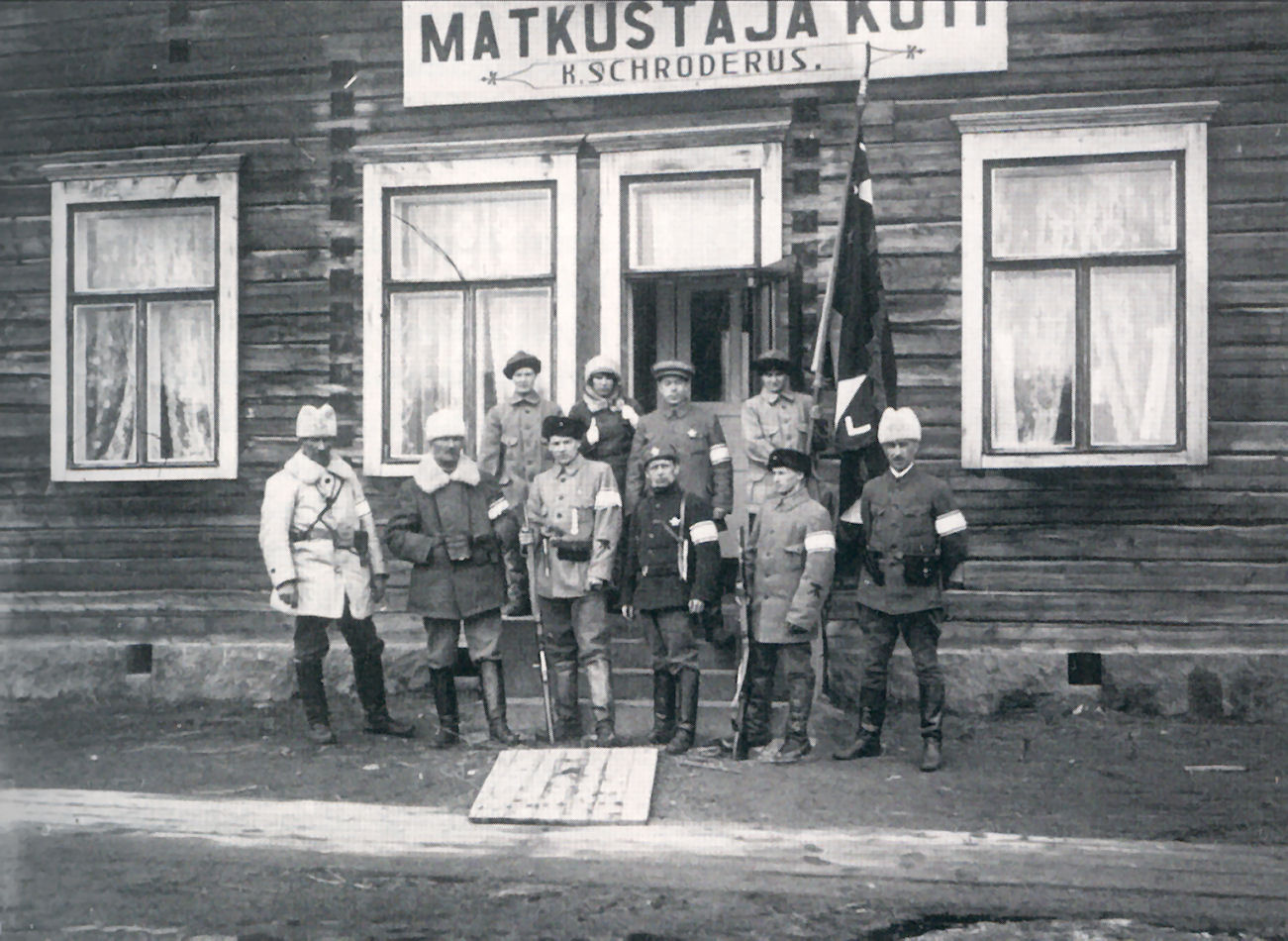
- Members of the first expedition in Rovaniemi
Date	4 April – 5 July 1918
Location	Petsamo
Result	Allied victory: Finnish invasion repelled

Belligerents
Finnish volunteers	(United Kingdom) Royal Marines (United Kingdom) Royal Navy; Russian SFSR (Russia) White Movement; Red Guards (Finns)

Commanders and leaders
Thorsten Renvall; Onni Laitinen; Helge Aspelund	(United Kingdom) Captain Vincent Brown (WIA) (United Kingdom) Captain James Farie

Strength
150–200	500; 1 armoured cruiser

Casualties and losses
5 killed (Finnish claim); 10 killed 4 missing (British claim)	2 killed (Finnish claim); Several wounded (British claim)
- 1 civilian killed 1 civilian wounded

The 1918 expedition, still during the First World War, was composed of about 200 volunteers and was led by doctors Thorsten Renvall and Onni Laitinen. The military mission departed from Vaasa, then the provisional capital of Finland, to Rovaniemi, under the mandate of the Finnish Senate. The Senate ruled that all the expeditionaries should be volunteers and that the theatre of operations should not extend beyond the boundaries of Petsamo region. The 30 men-strong party reached their first destination on 6 April and were reinforced by other 60 men commanded by Kaarlo Karhunen. Other 60 volunteers from Oulu, six of them women, joined the trip at Virtaniemi. The expedition crossed the border on 26 April. Sixty Sámi with 200 reindeers were hired as sled drivers. Some villages met the newcomers with distrust and even open hostility. A civilian was shot dead in a confuse incident at Höyhenjärvi, and there was a minor skirmish with local residents and Red Guards at the village of Salmijärvi, which had been fully evacuated by its inhabitants. The cattle was either sent to Norway or slaughtered.

The Finnish force was confronted by the British Royal Navy, whose goal was to prevent the German Army from following in the wake. The British, who were intervening in the Russia Civil War and had established their headquarters at Murmansk, sent in the cruiser HMS Cochrane with sailors, Royal Marines and 40 Red Army soldiers, who took positions around the Pechenga Monastery.

The first clash between the opposing forces happened in early May, when a party of White Finnish ski troops beat off a patrol of Royal Marines and sailors from HMS Cochrane. Finnish sources recorded an encounter of the expedition's recce platoon with a British-led detachment approximately at the same date near Vuoremi. A major battle followed on 10 May at Tunturimaja. The Finnish raiding troops, divided in three, encountered a group made up of 20 Russian White sailors from the cruiser Askold, two White Russian militiamen and ten Finnish Red Guards, all of them commanded by eight British officers and ratings. British sources claim that the action took place on 8 May and that it involved 15 local skiers and at least 30 Royal Marines commanded by Captain Vincent Brown, a veteran of the Western Front. The Allied squad found a Finnish camp and launched a two-column attack on the position, only to be ambushed by two Finnish rearguard companies in charge of Renvall himself. The battle lasted for two hours. According to Finnish sources, a Russian sailor was killed and two members of the Finnish expedition were wounded. Despite this initial success, the Finnish party was hit by illness, desertions, and disputes between Renvall and Laitinen over leadership and communications with the Finnish government.

In the earlier hours of 11 May, the expedition reached a high position near Petsamo fiord. Although the party spotted HMS Cochrane, Laitinen took for granted that no enemy troops were deployed in the area, and decided not to send reconnaissance platoons to the villages surrounding Petsamo. The plan was to occupy the villages of Trifona, Parkinna and Näsykkä, which were already controlled by the Allies. South of Näsykkä lays the Pechenga Monastery, were British and White Russian troops were entrenched. A two-pronged assault was launched, but it was met with fierce resistance. The northern wing was attacked from three different directions, while the southern group was outnumbered by a column of Russian sailors who launched a counterattack from the monastery, supported by gunfire from HMS Cochrane. A hasty Finnish retreat followed, in which several ammunition wagons and reindeers were left behind. Two volunteers were killed in action; the Allies lost a British serviceman, and a local boy was seriously injured. The British acknowledge a few casualties, among them Captain Brown, who was severely wounded by machine gun fire, and received information of ten White Finnish killed and four missing, Heavy snow prevented the British from carrying out a fresh pursuit. A Royal Marines' ambush on one of the retreating expeditionary columns was thwarted on 13 May. The expedition fell back 60 km in a day, and on 15 May, after reaching the border post of Virtaniemi, they sent a telegram to the Finnish Senate reporting their failure at Petsamo; in the case of Laitinen, he presented his resignation.

After receiving reinforcements on 19 May, the expedition made a last bid to establish a bridgehead on the other side of the border from Norway. On 13 June, a party of 16 men commanded by Helge Aspelsund, the young officer who had been in charge of the expedition's recce patrol, attempted a landing in three fishing boats on Töllev, on the eastern shores of Lake Klistervatnet, to relieve nearby Kolttakönkä, a border outpost between Norway and Petsamo. The position had been held by a skeleton garrison of two Finnish officers until 4 June, when they surrendered to Norway's border guards when near starvation. The operation had been betrayed by an informant, and the volunteers were surprised just before landing by a detachment of Red Guards led by a British officer. Three Finnish were killed when the leading boat was hit, and the remaining men were forced to take shelter on the beach from where they returned fire. All the survivors of the raid, Alpesund included, were eventually detained by Norwegian border guards who had witnessed the battle. The three fallen were buried with honors by the British officer and his subordinates. Renvall learned of the defeat at Töllev on 22 June and then withdrew to Virtaniemi. After a last ditch petition to the Senate asking for fresh troops, Renvell handed his command to Jalmari Tela on 5 July, when the Finnish Senate's mandate for the expedition expired. Tela became the leader of a 40-strong garrison at Virtaniemi tasked with preventing any Red Guard infiltration through the border. All but one of the 18 men held by Norway were released by September, the remainder having died from Spanish flu. Renvell's final report put the blame for the failure on Laitinen's hesitancy.

== Interlude ==
The Finnish Senate sent a letter to the British government complaining that the British military had repelled by force the Finnish expedition and occupied Petsamo, a region which legally belonged to Finland. The British responded in September, explaining that they did not oppose to Finland's sovereignty over Petsamo, but as long as Germany represented a threat to Murmansk they could not accede to that demand. Finland and Soviet Russia held peace talks in Berlin in August 1918, but no agreement resulted since the Bolshevik government refused to hand the Kola peninsula over. A later bid of the Finnish government to bring their territorial claims to the Paris Peace Conference also ended in failure. Hopes that the armistice with Germany in November 1918 would mean the withdrawal of British and Allied forces from northern Russia were quickly quashed when the skirmishes with the Red Army soon developed into open conflict. When the campaign became increasingly unpopular in Britain, and the Allied armies began to evacuated the region for good in September 1919, the White Russian resistance quickly collapsed. A previous promise of the Bolsheviks that they would give up Petsamo encouraged the Finnish to try another expedition by 1920.

== 1920 ==
Second Petsamo expedition
- Part of Heimosodat
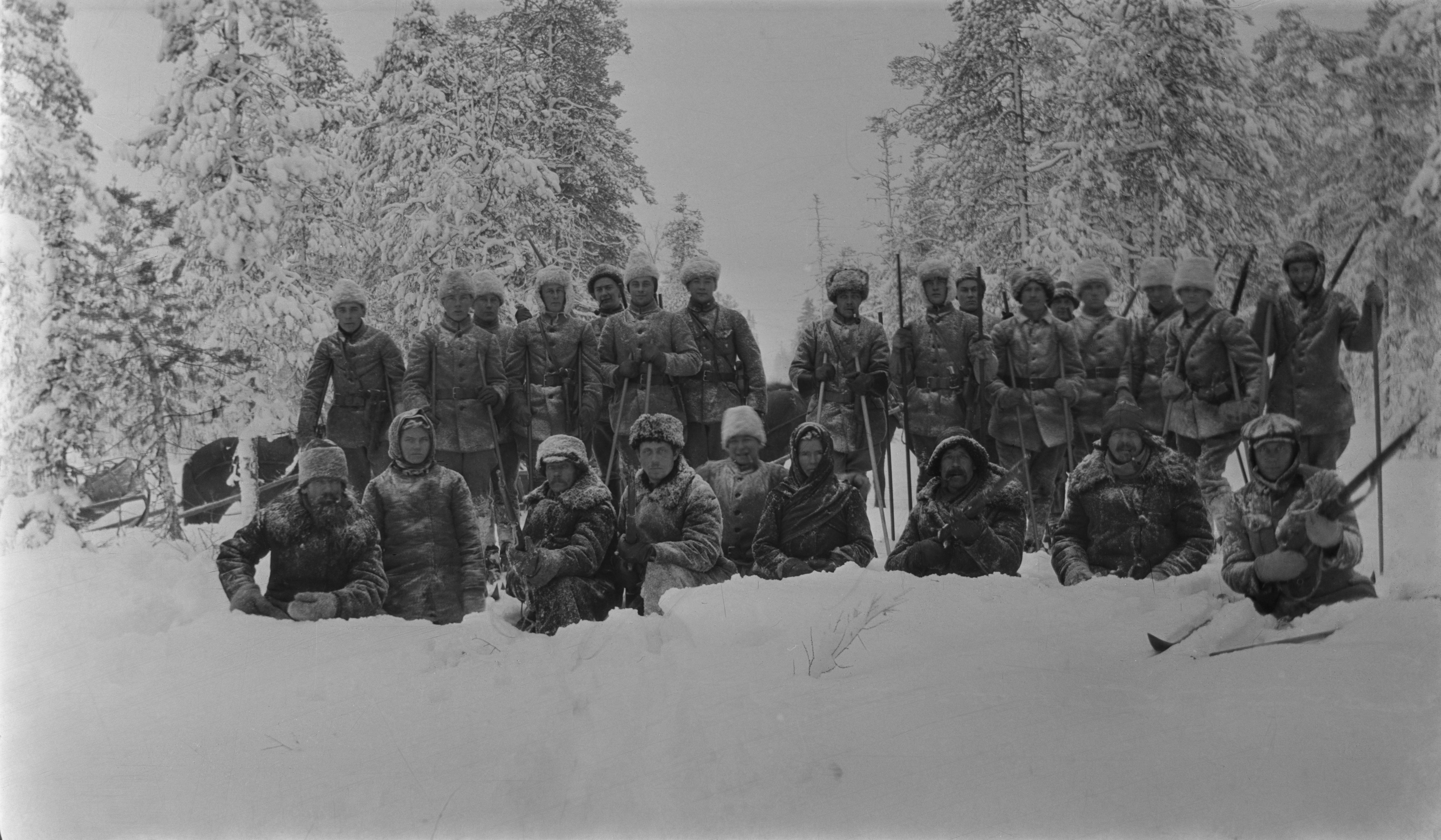
- Finnish ski troops (1919-1920)
Date	20 December 1919 – 1 July 1920
Location	Petsamo
Result	Soviet victory: Finnish invasion defeated; Treaty of Tartu

Belligerents
Finnish volunteers	Russian SFSR

Commanders and leaders
Kurt Martti Wallenius; Gustaf Taucher	Ivan Alexandrov

Strength
196	400

Casualties and losses
4 killed 29 interned 3 defectors	3 killed

The 1920 expedition was initially composed of 60 men commanded by General Kurt Martti Wallenius. The rationale for the expedition was the request of White Russian General Yevgeny Miller to the Finnish government for reconnecting the telegraph line between Alexandrovsk and Rovaniemi. The works would take place on Finnish territory, but the authorities deemed necessary to provide security on the Russian side of the border, with Miller's consensus.

The expedition departed from Rovaniemi on 7 January in three columns, and after some delays caused by Norway government concerns, they crossed the border at Virtaniemi on 18 January. Norwegian authorities planned to hold a referendum to determine whether or not residents in the area desired to join their country, while local populations, who feared that the expedition could put their trade with Norway at risk, had an unfriendly attitude toward the volunteers on both sides of the border. Most of the population fled to Norway, taking with them reindeers, sleds, supplies and food.

The Finnish volunteers reconnected the telegraph lines between Salmijärvi and Petsamo on 3 February, and on 7 February the expedition arrived in Petsamo fiord, where they found no resistance from the local White detachment, led by Sergey Sokolovsky, a Cossack captain, and consisting of 50 demoralised soldiers. Finnish troops billeted in the barracks formerly occupied by British and Russian White forces.

On 18 February Petsamo witnessed the influx of hundreds of refugees escaping persecution in Murmansk, including a number of Red Guards who were immediately put under Finnish command; Russian White resistance in northern Russia, however, collapsed by 21 February, and the Finnish officers allowed the Bolsheviks to disarm Sokolovsky and his men. The White troops were interned at Trifonia, one of the three villages around Petsamo fiord.

Once the Russian Civil War was over, Wallenius was granted the reinforcements he had long requested. The Finnish government sent a battalion and resupplies aboard the steamer Silvia, but the arrival of fresh troops was delayed by a month when the cargo ship ran aground in the Danish Straits and had to be docked. This mean that Wallenius had to resort to delaying tactics and negotiations with the Bolsheviks until the eventual coming of the battalion on 18 March. One of the first decisions was to disarm the Red Guards still at Petsamo. Another measure was to ration food, which had become scarce with a now 196-strong garrison. Government information about a Soviet Russian expedition to Petsamo fiord, an ultimatum from the Russian authorities at Murmansk and the fear of being cut off from their line of supply by a sudden attack led Wallenius to retreat inland to Vuoremi, leaving a string of forward positions at Parkkina, Trifona, Heikinpaikka, Alaluostar and Yläluostar.

The Bolshevik offensive finally materialised with a naval landing on Petsamo on 22 March 1920, supported by 150 ski troops marching from Murmansk. The Russians warships shelled the slopes where the Finnish troops were deployed, and the Red Army soon blocked the retreat route of the forward outposts. Wallenius ordered the withdrawal of his forces first to Vuoremi and then to the hamlet of Samiyarvi, which served as the expedition's ammunition depot. The Silvia unloaded its resupplies at Vuoremi on 24 March, giving some relief to the exhausted Finnish volunteers. By 31 March, the expedition was isolated at Samiyarvi, pressed by ski troops from the north, by the Russian main force from the east and by Red Finnish ski guerrillas on the rear. The battle began at 15.30, when the local school, converted in the expedition's headquarters, received an outburst of machine gun fire. After four hours of action, with his men almost surrounded and outnumbered, and despite Senate orders on the contrary, Wallenius decided to withdraw through the border with Norway.

The expedition lost two volunteers in the battle of Samiyarvi. Two other died of wounds in Kirkenes, Norway. Three other deserted to the Red Army. The Russians suffered three dead, one of them an ethnic Finnish. Norwegian authorities interned 29 ski troops.

Wallenius and his remaining forces retreat to Virtaniemi through swamps and swollen streams. They reached destination on 4 April. Wallenius returned to Rovaniemi, where he handed the command to Lieutenant Alfred Sippus. Though the fiasco was to blame to the miscalculations of the government and the high command, Wallenius became the escape goat, and was replaced by Major Gustaf Taucher. As negotiations with Russia loomed, the expedition, now reinforced, was banned from crossing the frontier and expended the next three months performing drills and border guarding. On 1 July, the volunteers handed over their duties to the Lapland Border Guard.

== Aftermath ==
In the Treaty of Tartu, signed on 14 October 1920, Petsamo was handed over by Soviet Russia to Finland and became the Petsamo Province until the Winter War of 1939.

== See also ==
- Viena expedition
- Forest Guerrillas

== Gallery ==
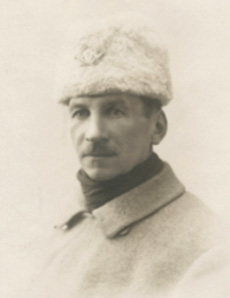
Thorsten Renvall, one of the commanders of the 1918 expedition

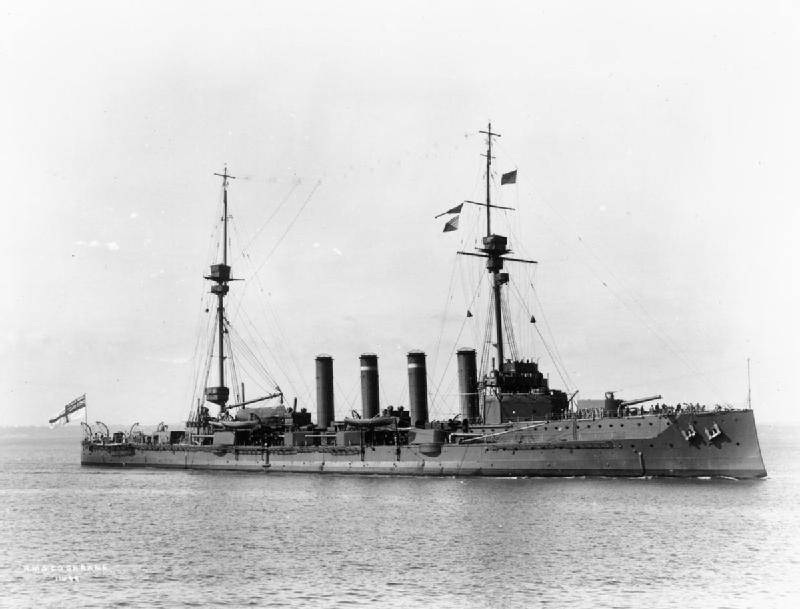
HMS Cochrane, the British cruiser that landed the Royal Marines, sailors and Russian Red Guards who defended Petsamo fiord in 1918

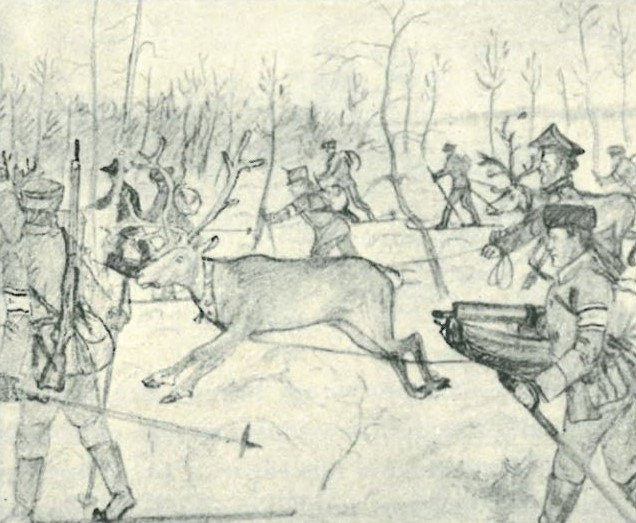
The 1918 expedition marching on skis through the snow-covered hills. Drawing by Thorsten Renvall

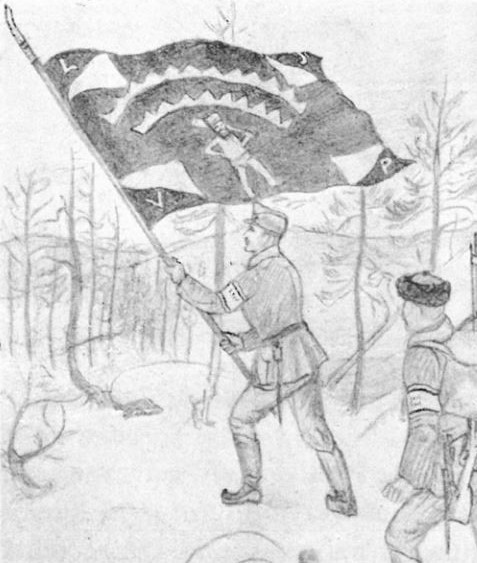
A Finnish officer of the 1918 expedition waiving the Jagers flag. Drawing by Thorsten Renvall

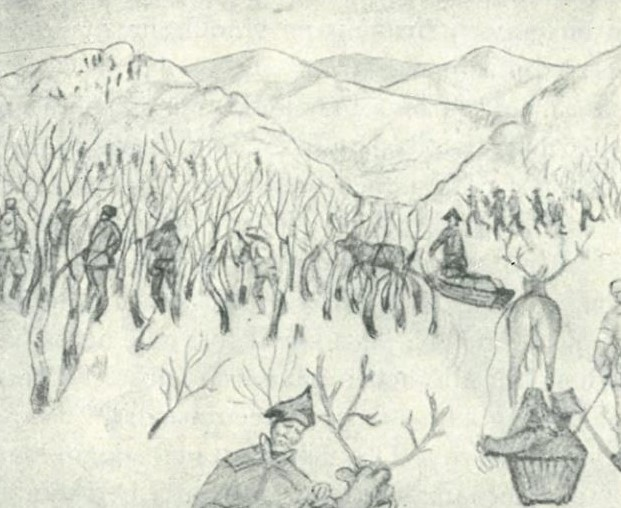
The expedition recce platoon clashes with a patrol of Royal Marines and sailors from HMS Cochrane at Vuoremi in early May 1918. Drawing by Thorsten Renvall

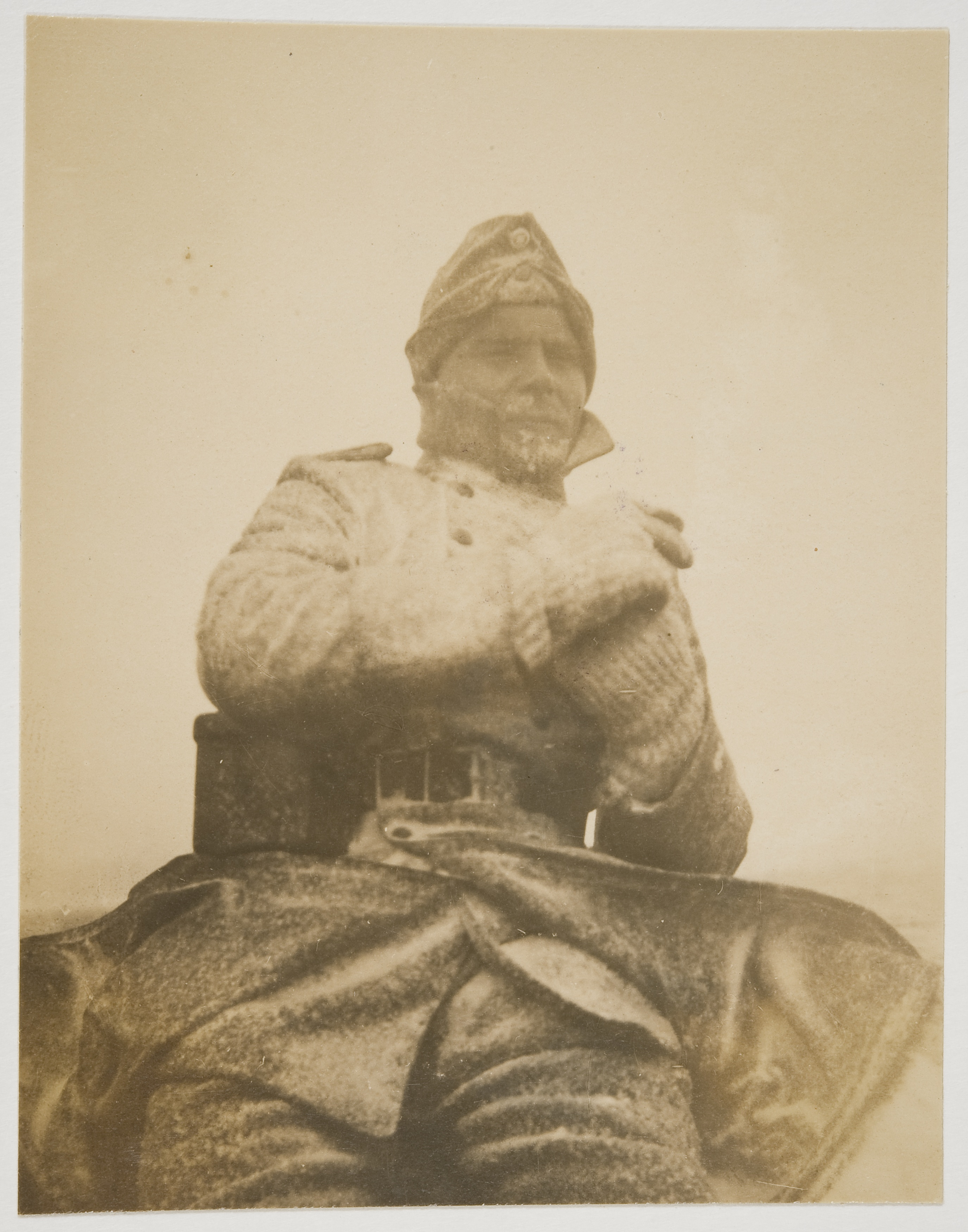
Finnish Captain Eino Järvinen amid intense blizzard in the region of Petsamo, 3 March 1920

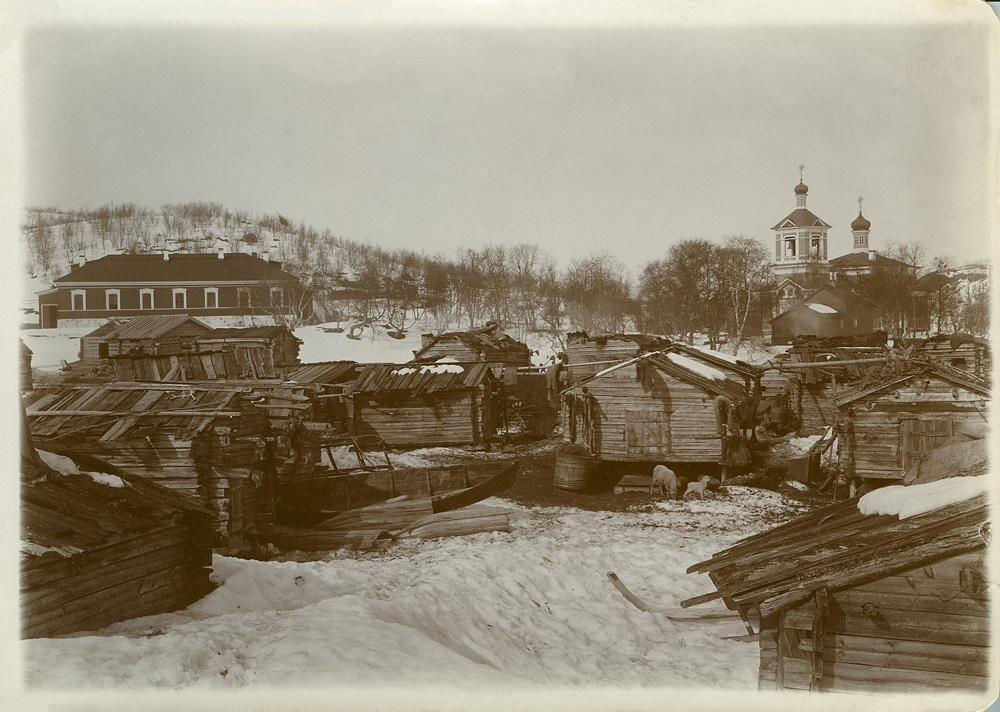
Költtakönkä settlement (Borisgleb in Russian) in the 1920s

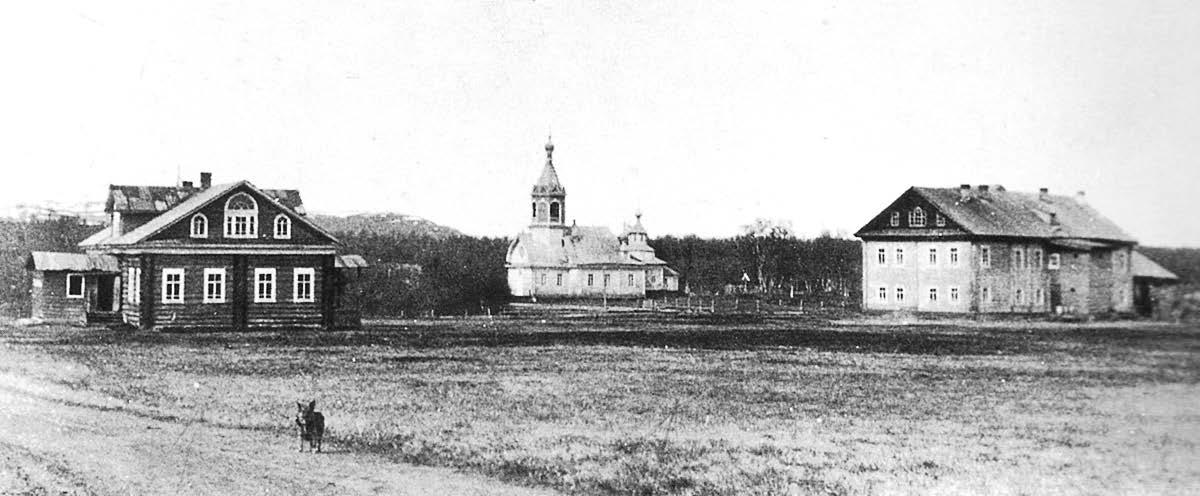
Pechenga Monastery, the headquarters of the British and Russian troops during the Finnish expedition of 1918. The facilities were occupied by Finnish troops in the 1920 expedition.

== Bibliography ==
- Aatsinki, Ulla (2008). Tukkiliikkeestä kommunismiin: Lapin työväenliikkeen radikalisoituminen ennen ja jälkeen 1918 [From the log movement to communism: The radicalization of the working class movement in Lapland before and after 1918] (in Finnish). Tampere University Press. ISBN 9789514475740.
- Lehtola, Veli-Pekka (2012). Wallenius : kirjailijakenraali Kurt Martti Walleniuksen elämä ja tuotanto [Wallenius: the life and work of writer general Kurt Martti Wallenius] (PDF) (in Finnish). Kustannus-Puntsi.
- Mawdsley, Evan (2007). The Russian Civil War. Pegasus Books. ISBN 9781933648156.
- Ninikangas, Kari (2013). Tervapääskyn siivellä : Thorsten Renvallin ja hänen huvilansa tarina [On the wings of a tarantula: the story of Thorsten Renvall and his villa.] (in Finnish). Lighthouse Consulting. ISBN 978-951-98614-2-5.
- Paasilinna, Erno (1980). Kaukana maailmasta : historiaa ja muistoja Petsamosta [Far from the world: history and memories of Petsamo .] (in Finnish). Helsinki: Otava. ISBN 951-10604-2-2.
- Wright, Damien (2017). Churchill's Secret War with Lenin: British and Commonwealth Military Intervention in the Russian Civil War, 1918-20. Solihull: Helion. ISBN 978-1-911512-10-3.
