= Songelsky Selsoviet =

Songelsky Selsoviet (Russian: Сонгельский сельсовет) was an administrative division (a selsoviet) of Kolsko-Loparskaya Volost of Alexandrovsky Uyezd of Arkhangelsk Governorate in the Russian SFSR.

It was established within Kolsko-Loparskaya Volost no later than March 16, 1920 with the administrative center in the pogost of Songelsky. It was abolished in March 1921, after the Soviet–Finnish Treaty of Tartu, which was signed on October 14, 1920, took effect. A part of the selsoviet's territory was transferred to Finland.
