= Lovozersky =

Lovozersky (masculine), Lovozerskaya (feminine), or Lovozerskoye (neuter) may refer to:

- Lovozersky District (est. 1927), a district of Murmansk Oblast, Russia
- Lovozerskaya Volost (1920–1927), a volost in Arkhangelsk Governorate, and later in Murmansk Governorate, of the Russian SFSR
- Lovozersky pogost, former designation of Lovozero, a rural locality (a selo) in Lovozersky District of Murmansk Oblast, Russia
