= Lovozerskaya Volost =

Lovozerskaya Volost (Russian: Лово́зерская во́лость) or Loparskaya Volost (Russian: Лопа́рская во́лость) was an administrative division (a volost) of Alexandrovsky Uyezd of Arkhangelsk Governorate and later of Murmansk Governorate of the Russian SFSR.

On January 8, 1918, the community assembly of Voronezhskoye (Voronyinskoye) Rural Community decided to establish a separate Lovozerskaya Volost out of four pogosts of Kolsko-Loparskaya Volost. The request was considered by the Alexandrovsk zemstvo on March 29, 1919, but no final decision had been made and the matter was postponed pending the review of the reasons substantiating the request. The new volost was not established until the restoration of the Soviet power on the Kola Peninsula in 1920. On March 2, 1920, Murmansk Soviet of the Commissars issued Resolution No. 4 which established Loparskaya Volost (instead of Lovozerskaya Volost), the population of which was predominantly Sami.

The volost (as Lovozerskaya) became a part of Murmansk Governorate at the time of its establishment in 1921, and was abolished on August 1, 1927 along with the rest of the volosts of Murmansk Governorate when the latter was transformed into Murmansk Okrug, redistricted, and transferred to the newly created Leningrad Oblast.
