= Pulozero =

Pulozero Пулозеро
- Selo
- Interactive map of Pulozero
- Location of Pulozero Pulozero (Murmansk Oblast)
- Coordinates: 68°21′25″N 33°18′07″E
- Country: Russia
- Federal subject: Murmansk Oblast
- Administrative district: Kolsky District
- Territorial okrugSelsoviet: Pushnovsky Territorial Okrug

Population (2010 Census)
  - Total: 7
  - Estimate (2021): 4 (−42.9%)

Municipal status
  - Municipal district: Kolsky Municipal District
  - Urban settlement: Pushnoy Rural Settlement
- Time zone: UTC+3 (MSK)
- Postal code: 184321
- Dialing code: +7 81553
- OKTMO ID: 47605404106

Pulozero (Russian: Пулозеро) is a rural locality (a selo) in Pushnovsky Territorial Okrug of Kolsky District of Murmansk Oblast, Russia, located on the Kola Peninsula beyond the Arctic Circle at a height of 141 meters (463 ft) above sea level. Population: 7 (2010 Census).

== History ==
Pulozero, then a pogost, served as the administrative center of Pulozersky Selsoviet, which was established within Kolsko-Loparskaya Volost of Alexandrovsky Uyezd of Arkhangelsk Governorate by the Resolution of Kolsko-Loparskaya Volost Executive Committee on August 26, 1921 (which came into effect in the first half of 1922) on the territory split off from Yekostrovsky Selsoviet.
