= Kolsko-Loparskaya Volost =

Selsoviets of Kolsko-Loparskaya Volost established in 1920
- (Administrative centers and the dates of establishment are given in parentheses)
- Selsoviets: 1. Ekostrovsky (selo of Polovinka; est. February 29, 1920); 2. Notozersky (pogost of Notozersky; est. March 14, 1920); 3. Songelsky (pogost of Songelsky; est. by March 16, 1920); 4. Chalmozersky (pogost of Chalmozersky; est. April 13, 1920); 5. Kildinsky (pogost of Kildinsky; est. by April 24, 1920); 6. Motovsky (pogost of Motovsky; by April 24, 1920); 7. Peyve-Yarvinsky (village of Peyve-Yarvi; est. May 30, 1920)

Kolsko-Loparskaya Volost (Russian: Ко́льско-Лопа́рская во́лость) was at various times an administrative division (a volost) of Kemsky, Kolsky, and Alexandrovsky Uyezds of Arkhangelsk Governorate of the Russian Empire (and later of the Russian SFSR), and then of Murmansk Governorate of the Russian SFSR. It existed in 1868–1927.

The volost was established in 1868 when Ekostrovskaya, Pechengskaya, and Voronyinskaya Volosts of Kemsky Uyezd were merged. In 1871, Murmansko-Kolonistskaya Volost was split off from it. When Kolsky Uyezd (known as Alexandrovsky since 1899 and, alternatively, Murmansky since 1920) was restored on February 19 [O.S. February 8], 1883, Kolsko-Loparskaya Volost was one of the six volosts transferred to it from Kemsky Uyezd. On January 14 [O.S. January 1], 1912, Teriberskaya Volost was split off.

On January 8, 1918, the community assembly of Voronezhskoye (Voronyinskoye) Rural Community decided to establish a separate Lovozerskaya Volost out of four of the pogosts of Kolsko-Loparskaya Volost (Lovozersky, Lyaozersky, Semiostrovsky, and Voronezhsky). The request was considered by the Alexandrovsk zemstvo on March 29, 1919, but no final decision was made and the matter was postponed pending the review of the reasons substantiating the request. The new volost was not established until the restoration of the Soviet power on the Kola Peninsula in 1920. On March 2, 1920, the Murmansk Soviet of the Commissars issued Resolution No. 4 which established the new volost under the name of Loparskaya (instead of Lovozerskaya), the population of which was predominantly Sami. The Murmansky Uyezd Executive Committee issued its own resolution on June 1, 1920.

The creation of selsoviets within the volost started in February 1920.

In the beginning of 1921, as a result of the Treaty of Tartu signed between Russia and Finland on October 14, 1920, portions of Kolsko-Loparskaya Volost (a part of Songelsky Selsoviet in particular) were ceded to Finland.

The volost became a part of Murmansk Governorate at the time of its establishment on June 13, 1921.

By the Resolution of the volost Executive Committee of August 26, 1921, new Pulozersky Selsoviet, with the administrative center in the pogost of Pulozero, was established in the first half of 1922 on the territory split off from Yekostrovsky Selsoviet. Imandrsky Selsoviet was mentioned in some of the documents in 1922–1924, but its existence is not corroborated by other documents, which included the station of Imandra as a part of Yekostrovsky Selsoviet. In 1923, when the pogost of Notozersky was moved down the Tuloma River, the settlement of Restikent became the administrative center of Notozersky Selsoviet. On July 8, 1924, the Presidium of the Murmansk Governorate Executive Committee issued a resolution transferring the pogost of Motovsky to Novozerskaya Volost. While the resolution was never approved by the All-Russian Central Executive Committee, it was nevertheless implemented in practice. On December 9, 1924, the volost Executive Committee issued a resolution to move the administrative center of Yekostrovsky Selsoviet from the selo of Polovinka to the station of Khibino.

The volost was abolished on August 1, 1927 along with the rest of the volosts of Murmansk Governorate when the latter was transformed into Murmansk Okrug, redistricted, and transferred to the newly created Leningrad Oblast. The territory of the former Kolsko-Loparskaya Volost became a part of Kolsko-Loparsky District.
