= Ekostrovskoye Rural Community =

Ekostrovskoye Rural Community (Russian: Экостровское сельское общество) was an administrative division (a rural community) of Kemsky Uyezd of Arkhangelsk Governorate of the Russian Empire, which existed in 1861–1866.

Ekostrovskoye Rural Community was one of the eight rural communities of Kemsky Uyezd created on March 8 [O.S. February 25], 1861 to replace volosts. The rural community had the same rights as the volosts in other uyezds.

As of the time of its creation, it included the pogosts of Babinsky, Ekostrovsky, Maselgsky, Notozersky, and Songelsky.

In 1866, the rural community was transformed into Ekostrovskaya Volost.
