= Imandra =

Imandra Имандра
- Selo
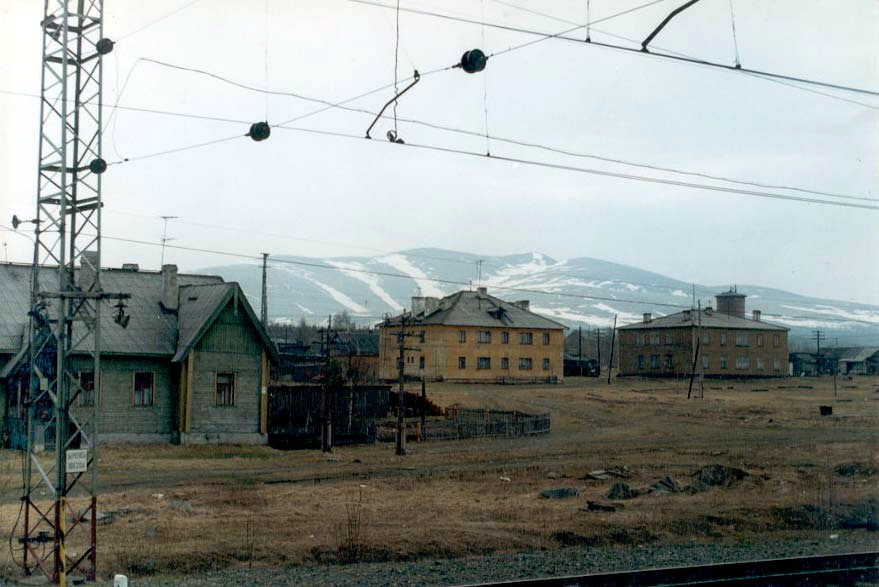
- View from the railway station
- Interactive map of Imandra
- Location of Imandra Imandra (Murmansk Oblast)
- Coordinates: 67°51′1″N 33°15′32″E
- Country: Russia
- Federal subject: Murmansk Oblast
- Administrative district: Olenegorsk
- Founded: 1924

Population (2010 Census)
  - Total: 19
  - Estimate (2021): 5 (−73.7%)
- Time zone: UTC+3 (MSK)
- Postal code: 184533
- Dialing code: +7 81536
- OKTMO ID: 47717000106

Imandra (Russian: Имандра) is a rural locality (a Selo) in Olenegorsk municipality of Murmansk Oblast, Russia. The village is located on the eastern shore of Lake Imandra, at an elevation of 154 m above sea level.

== History ==
The station of Imandra may have been a part of Imandrsky Selsoviet, which possibly existed in 1922–1924 in Kolsko-Loparskaya Volost of Alexandrovsky Uyezd of Arkhangelsk Governorate in the Russian SFSR, although some documents included it as a part of Yekostrovsky Selsoviet.

== Transportation ==
The Imandra station on the St. Petersburg—Murmansk railway is located here.
