= Imandrsky Selsoviet =

Imandrsky Selsoviet (Russian: Имандрский сельсовет) may have been an administrative division (a selsoviet) of Kolsko-Loparskaya Volost of Alexandrovsky Uyezd of Arkhangelsk Governorate in the Russian SFSR. The existence of this selsoviet in 1922–1924 is confirmed by some documents; others, however, do not mention it and list the station of Imandra as a part of Yekostrovsky Selsoviet.
