= Ekostrovskaya Volost =

Ekostrovskaya Volost (Russian: Экостровская волость) was an administrative division (a volost) of Kemsky Uyezd of Arkhangelsk Governorate of the Russian Empire, which existed in 1866–1868.

It was established in 1866 when Ekostrovskoye Rural Community was transformed into a volost. In 1868, together with Voronyinskaya Volost and Pechengskaya Volost it was merged into a newly created Kolsko-Loparskaya Volost.
