= Voronyinskaya Volost =

Voronyinskaya Volost (Russian: Воро́ньинская во́лость) was an administrative division (a volost) of Kemsky Uyezd of Arkhangelsk Governorate of the Russian Empire, which existed in 1866–1868.

It was established in 1866 when Voronyinskoye Rural Community was transformed into a volost. In 1868, together with Ekostrovskaya and Pechengskaya Volosts it was merged into a newly created Kolsko-Loparskaya Volost.
