= Vayda-Guba =

Vayda-Guba Вайда-Губа
- Inhabited locality
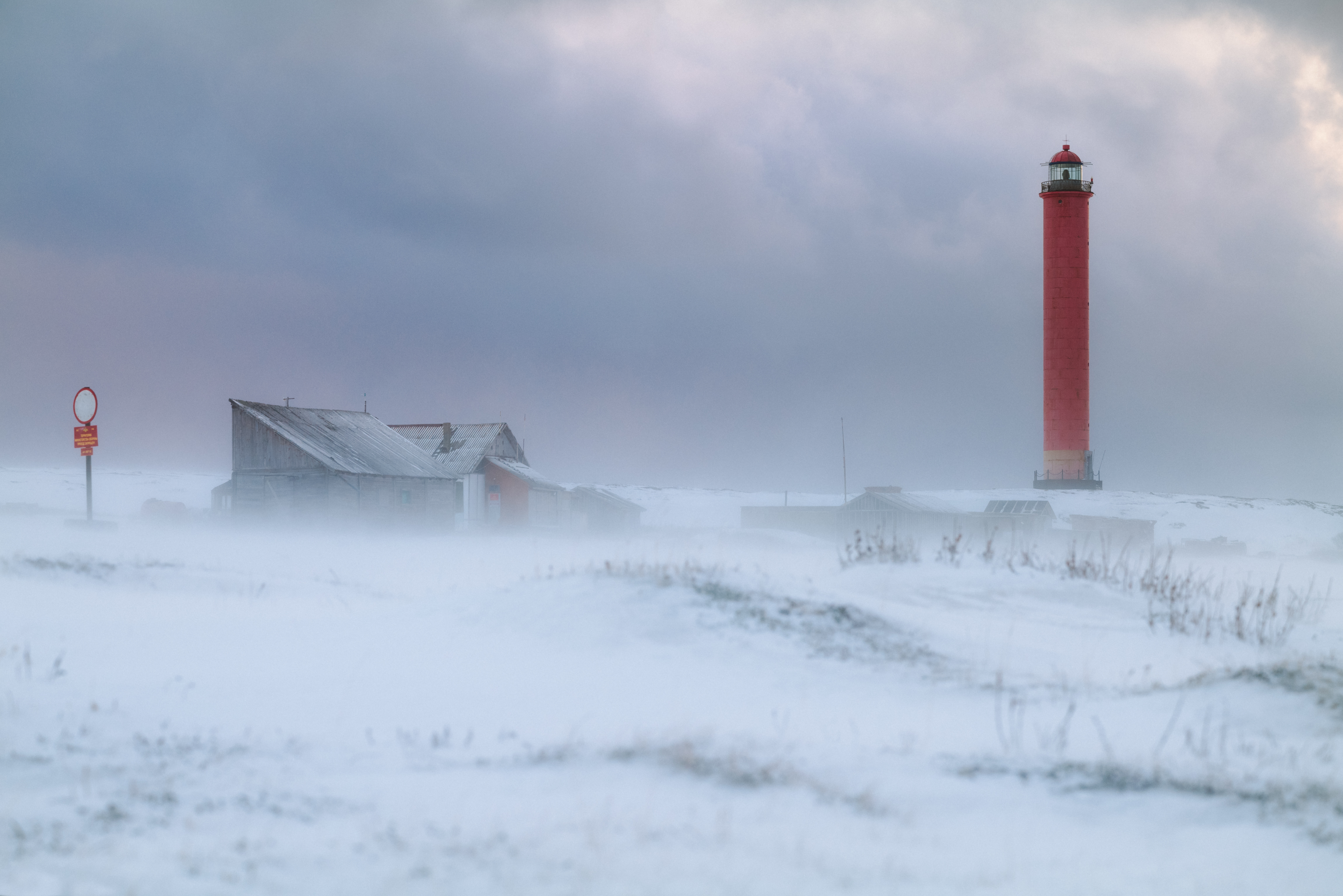
- Interactive map of Vayda-Guba
- Location of Vayda-Guba Vayda-Guba (Murmansk Oblast)
- Coordinates: 69°56′07″N 31°58′17″E
- Country: Russia
- Federal subject: Murmansk Oblast
- Administrative district: Pechengsky District
- Founded: 1860s

Population (2010 Census)
  - Total: 94
  - Estimate (2021): 51 (−45.7%)

Municipal status
  - Municipal district: Pechengsky Municipal District
  - Rural settlement: Pechenga Urban Settlement
- Time zone: UTC+3 (MSK)
- Postal code: 184410
- Dialing code: +7 81554
- OKTMO ID: 47615162106

Vayda-Guba (Russian: Вайда-Губа, Finnish: Vaitolahti, Norwegian: Vajda-Guba) is a rural locality (an inhabited locality) in Pechengsky District of Murmansk Oblast, Russia, located beyond the Arctic Circle on the Rybachy Peninsula at a height of 15 meters (49 ft) above sea level. Population: 94 (2010 Census).

== History ==
Vayda-Guba was founded in the 1860s when the Murman Coast was actively being settled. From 1920 to 1940 the border of Finland and the Soviet Union ran through the village. The western side was Finland and eastern side Soviet Union. The population in 1939 was 141.

== Climate ==
Vayda-Guba has a subarctic climate (Dfc) with cool, wet summers and moderately cold winters lasting most of the year.

Climate data for Vayda Guba (1991–2020 normals, extremes 1894–present)
Month	Jan	Feb	Mar	Apr	May	Jun	Jul	Aug	Sep	Oct	Nov	Dec	Year
Record high °C (°F)	7.1 (44.8)	5.5 (41.9)	8.1 (46.6)	14.2 (57.6)	24.4 (75.9)	31.0 (87.8)	32.4 (90.3)	27.9 (82.2)	22.3 (72.1)	14.4 (57.9)	11.8 (53.2)	10.1 (50.2)	32.4 (90.3)
Mean daily maximum °C (°F)	−2.2 (28.0)	−2.7 (27.1)	−1.1 (30.0)	1.8 (35.2)	6.4 (43.5)	10.3 (50.5)	14.1 (57.4)	13.4 (56.1)	10.0 (50.0)	4.8 (40.6)	1.1 (34.0)	−0.6 (30.9)	4.6 (40.3)
Daily mean °C (°F)	−4.6 (23.7)	−5.1 (22.8)	−3.1 (26.4)	−0.2 (31.6)	3.8 (38.8)	7.4 (45.3)	10.9 (51.6)	10.7 (51.3)	7.8 (46.0)	3.1 (37.6)	−0.9 (30.4)	−2.7 (27.1)	2.3 (36.1)
Mean daily minimum °C (°F)	−7.3 (18.9)	−7.9 (17.8)	−5.6 (21.9)	−2.6 (27.3)	1.4 (34.5)	5.1 (41.2)	8.4 (47.1)	8.2 (46.8)	5.4 (41.7)	1.0 (33.8)	−3.2 (26.2)	−5.2 (22.6)	−0.2 (31.7)
Record low °C (°F)	−25.4 (−13.7)	−27.2 (−17.0)	−24.0 (−11.2)	−19.8 (−3.6)	−13.6 (7.5)	−4.1 (24.6)	0.0 (32.0)	−1.8 (28.8)	−5.4 (22.3)	−15.7 (3.7)	−20.9 (−5.6)	−25.8 (−14.4)	−27.2 (−17.0)
Average precipitation mm (inches)	37 (1.5)	31 (1.2)	34 (1.3)	28 (1.1)	35 (1.4)	48 (1.9)	52 (2.0)	53 (2.1)	51 (2.0)	65 (2.6)	41 (1.6)	39 (1.5)	514 (20.2)
Source: Погода и Климат
