= Salmiyarvi =

Salmiyarvi Сальмиярви
- Posyolok
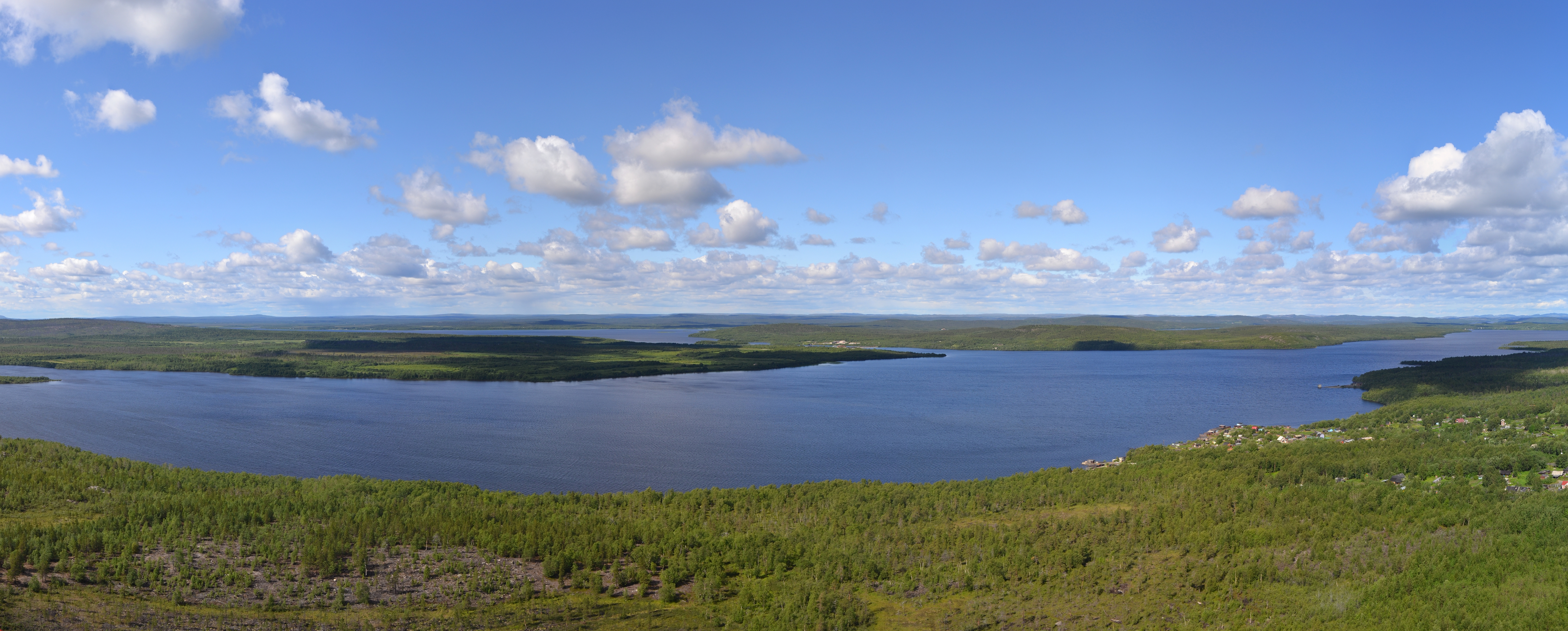
- Lake Kuetsjarvi, seen from the east towards Norway. The strait between Kuetsjarvi and Svanevatn, with Salmiyarvi on the northern shore, is seen in the middle of the picture.
- Interactive map of Salmiyarvi
- Location of Salmiyarvi Salmiyarvi (Murmansk Oblast)
- Coordinates: 69°27′00″N 30°07′59″E
- Country: Russia
- Federal subject: Murmansk Oblast
- Administrative district: Pechengsky District
- Founded: 1957
- Rural locality status since: May 2010
- Elevation: 70 m (230 ft)

Population (2010 Census)
  - Total: 71
  - Estimate (2021): 11 (−84.5%)
- Time zone: UTC+3 (MSK)
- Postal code: 184420
- Dialing code: +7 81554
- OKTMO ID: 47615151116

Salmiyarvi (Russian: Сальмиярви; Finnish: Salmijärvi; Skolt Sami: Čuäʹlmmjäuʹrr) is a rural locality (a Posyolok) in Pechengsky District of Murmansk Oblast, Russia. The village is located beyond the Arctic Circle, at a height of 70 m above sea level.

The original Russian name for the settlement was Chalmozero (Чалмозеро), under which name it was first mentioned in 1876 as a village populated by 29 Finnish families, with nine Sámi families living in its surroundings. In 1918, the village was populated by about 160 Finns and 35 Sámi people.

Chalmozero became the center of a selsoviet on 13 April 1920. However, after the Treaty of Tartu was signed later that year, the village was ceded to Finland as part of the Petsamo territory, which remained part of Finland until 1944.

Salmiyarvi became part of the Pechengsky District in 1945. The original settlement of Salmiyarvi was no longer mentioned after 1962, but its name was given to another settlement in the district, originally established in 1957 as 79 km shosseynoy dorogi Liinakhamari–Nikel–gosgranitsa (79 км шоссейной дороги Лиинахамари — Никель — госграница), in 1964.
