= Pogost =

Russian historical term

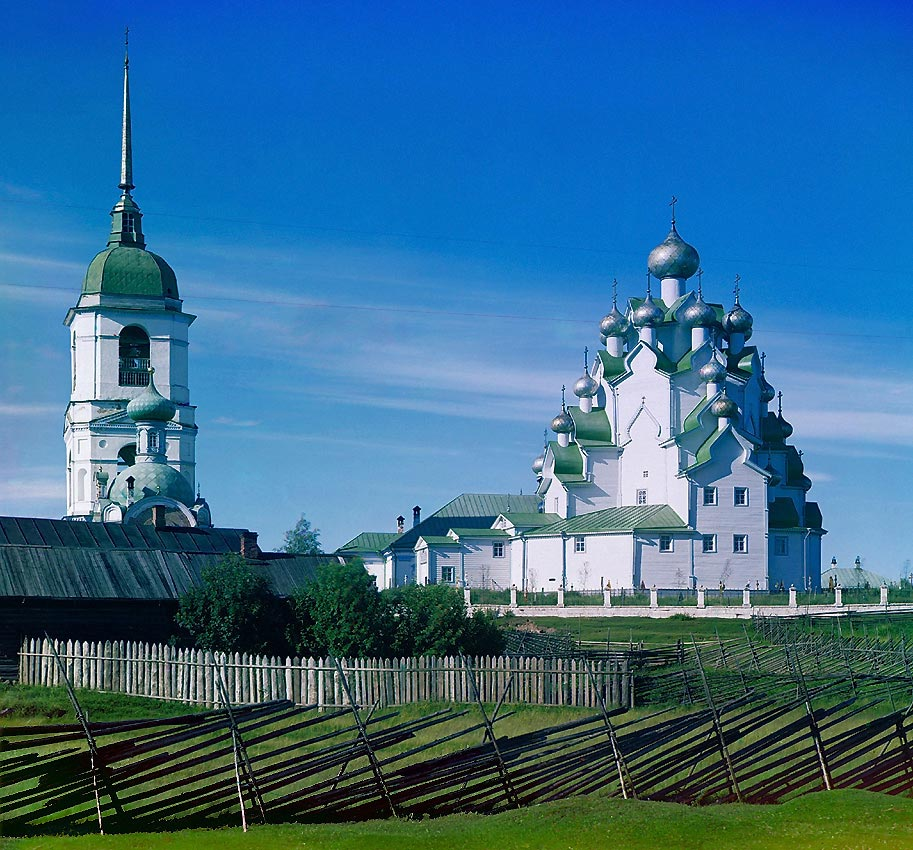
Vytegra Pogost, as photographed by Sergey Prokudin-Gorsky, c. 1912

A pogost (Russian: погост, pl. погосты, pogosty) is a historical Russian term for an administrative-territorial unit. In modern Russian, it typically refers to a rural church and graveyard. It has also been borrowed into Latgalian (pogosts), Finnish (pogosta) and Latvian (pagasts), with specific meanings.

== History ==
The word pogost is similar to modern Russian gost' (гость, 'guest'). It is derived from the Old Russian word pogostiti (погостити), meaning 'to be a guest', and was initially used to refer to a temporary lodging where clergy, princes and merchants could stay. It denoted a trading center where "guests" (merchants) made their stop and could conduct trade (Old Russian: гостьба, gostba). The pogost is first mentioned in the mid-10th century, when Princess Olga established pogosts and tribute points along the Msta River in northern Russia; later sources confirm that the pogost served as a tax collection center.

The term pogost came to refer to territorial centers, typically surrounded by numerous hamlets, that were used to receive dignitaries or guests, particularly in regions controlled by Novgorod. These sometimes had paired churches.

The modern Russian term for a hamlet, derevnya, appears in historical sources from the 14th century. In the territories of Smolensk and Novgorod, the term pogost was used to refer to a hamlet. This could mean a hamlet, distinguished in modern Russian as pogost-mesto (погост – место), and a village center of a small area, known as pogost-tsentr. The term could also be used to denote the surrounding area, known as pogost-okrug.

From the 10th century, the term selo was used to refer to a village on the estate of a landowner. By the 14th century, the terms selo and derevnya became interchangeable in the Russian North. As Christianity continued to spread in Russia after its formal introduction in the late 10th century, the term selo came to refer to a village with a church, starting from the 16th century.

In the Russian North, the pogost retained its status until 1775. The term pogost came to be understood as a rural church and graveyard. A pogost could have a freestanding bell tower positioned between and in front of two churches. It could also be enclosed by a low wall constructed from horizontal logs resting on a fieldstone base, with square towers at the corners. The most widely known example of the pogost, and Russian wooden architecture in general, is Kizhi Pogost on Kizhi Island in Lake Onega.

== Usage in Finland and Latvia ==
The central village of the Finnish kunta ('municipality') of Ilomantsi is usually called the pogosta of Ilomantsi (Ilomantsin pogosta), the word being obviously a borrowing from Russian. The local dialect of Finnish shows strong Russian influence, and there is a strong presence of Orthodox Christians in the municipality. Even the name of the local newspaper is Pogostan Sanomat ("The Pogosta News"), and a certain viral disease is locally called the Pogosta disease.

In the modern Finnish language, pogosta is also used in references to historical places, as a historical synonym for "parish" or "municipality" in Karelian, Ingrian and Russian contexts.

Pagasts is the name for a basic unit of local self-government in the Republic of Latvia. The word pagasts is a commonly used Latvian word equivalent to civil parish, rural municipality or small rural district, originating from Russian pogost. There are 432 rural municipalities or pagasti in Latvia.

== Sources ==
- Bogatova, G. A., ed. (1989). Словарь русского языка. XI – XVII вв. Выпуск 15. Перстъ – Подмышка. Наука. pp. 196–197. ISBN 5-02-010921-5.
- Brumfield, William Craft (2025). "The Russian North: Toward the White Sea". From Forest to Steppe: The Russian Art of Building in Wood. Duke University Press. pp. 117–239. ISBN 978-1-4780-2824-6.
- Kaiser, Daniel H. (14 July 2014). The Growth of the Law in Medieval Russia. Princeton University Press. ISBN 978-1-4008-5559-9.
- Pankov, Aleksandr A. (1898). Погосты в значении правительственных округов и сельских приходов в Северной России (in Russian). Moscow: Товарищество типо-литографии Владимир Чичерин.
- Prokhorov, A. M., ed. (1975). "Погост". Большая советская энциклопедия. Т. 20: Плата - Проб (3rd ed.). Советская энциклопедия. p. 89.
  - Prokhorov, A. M., ed. (1974). "Pogost". Great Soviet Encyclopedia (3rd ed.). Macmillan.
- Postan, M. M. (2 January 1966). The Cambridge Economic History of Europe from the Decline of the Roman Empire: Volume 1, Agrarian Life of the Middle Ages. Cambridge University Press. ISBN 978-0-521-04505-6.
