= List of ethnic cleansing campaigns =

This article lists incidents that have been termed ethnic cleansing by some academic or legal experts. Not all experts agree on every case, particularly since there are a variety of definitions of the term ethnic cleansing. Definitions cluster around the forced removal of all or a large number of an ethnic population from an area, or rendering an area ethnically homogenous. See the main article for further information. When claims of ethnic cleansing are made by non-experts (e.g. journalists or politicians) they are noted.

There is significant scholarly disagreement around the definition of ethnic cleansing and which events fall under this classification.

== Ancient, Medieval and Early Modern periods ==
=== Antiquity ===
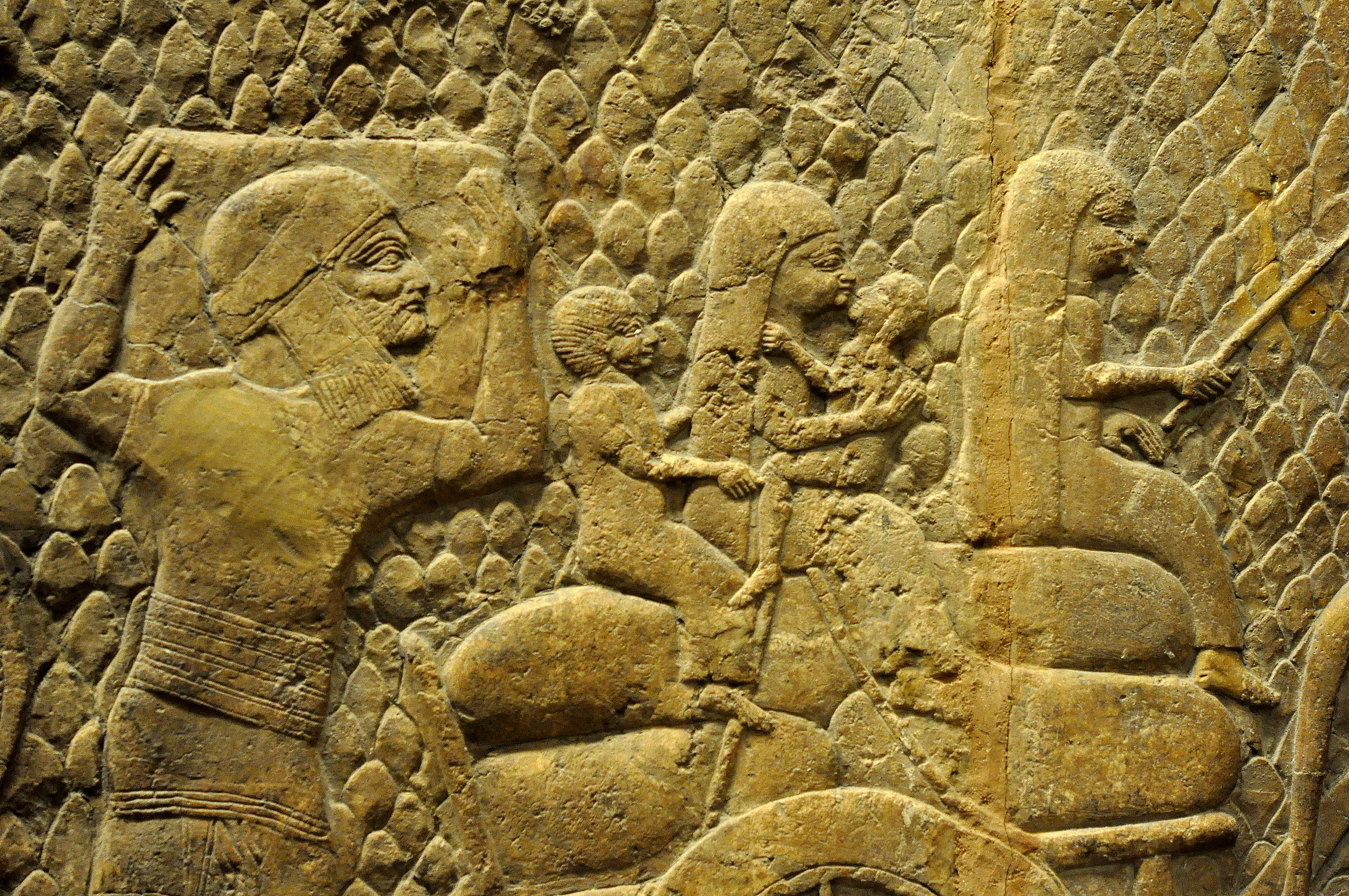
Judaean people being deported after the Siege of Lachish; wall relief from the South-West Palace at Nineveh

- The resettlement policy of the Neo-Assyrian Empire in the 9th and 7th centuries BC is considered by some scholars to be one of the first cases of ethnic cleansing.
  - c. 597 BC: When the Neo-Babylonian Empire conquered the Kingdom of Judah in modern-day Israel, tens of thousands of Jews were expelled from Israel, representing the first waves of the Jewish diaspora. This is referred to as the Babylonian Captivity.
- 416 BC: During the Peloponnesian War the Athenians had the neutral island polis of Melos destroyed, with the men of fighting age being killed, and the women and children sold as slaves. Athenian colonists were moved in afterwards. This is considered an important example of an ancient genocide.
- 353 BC: After the polis of Sestos refused to submit to Athens, the Strategos Chares of Athens killed the entire adult male population and sold the women and children into slavery, replacing them with Athenian colonists.
- c. 149-146 BC: The Sack of Carthage resulted in the city being destroyed, its population expelled or massacred, and any rebuilding forbidden. It is called a genocide by some scholars.
- c. 88 BC: The massacres of Romans living in Anatolia ordered by Mithridates VI Eupator. These were known as the Asiatic Vespers and are considered to be a genocide by some scholars.
- 58-50 BC: The Gallic Wars resulted in large amounts of the Gallic population being massacred or enslaved by the Roman Army. It has been called a genocide by some scholars.
  - c. 53-51 BC: Caesar claimed that he burnt all Eburones village he could find, his men ate all their grain, and drove away their animals. Caesar said he aimed to make the Eburones starve to death, and believed he succeeded. Daniel Chirot and Jennifer Edwards described this as a genocide. However, Johannes Heinrichs argues that such a genocide was impossible due to many of the areas the Eburoneans sought refuge in were impenetrable to the Roman Army, and cites Caesar's second campaign against them in 51 BC as proof that the Eburoneans weren't exterminated. Nico Roymans argues that the reason why the Eburoneans disappeared from history was due to "a policy of damnatio memoriae on the part of the Roman authorities, in combination with the confiscation of Eburonean territory".
- 115–117 AD: The Roman suppression of the Diaspora Revolt in Cyrenaica, Egypt and Cyprus led to the near-total expulsion and annihilation of Jews from these regions.
- 132–136 AD: During the Third Jewish-Roman War, Roman forces under the command of Hadrian killed over 580,000 Jews and razed over 985 Judean villages. The campaign has been described as an act of ethnic cleansing and genocide. The Jews are again expelled from Israel. Jews were prohibited from entering Jerusalem on pain of death.
- c. 350 AD: Ancient Chinese texts record that General Ran Min ordered the ethnic cleansing and extermination of the non-Han ethnic groups known as the Five Barbarians, especially the Jie people, during the Wei–Jie war in the fourth century AD.

=== Medieval period ===
- c. 800 AD: A group of Ancestral Puebloans were massacred in an early genocide in the American Southwest.
- 11th to 16th century AD: In the Inca Empire, the mitma was a policy of forced resettlement employed by the empire. It involved the forceful migration of groups of extended families or ethnic groups from their home territory to lands recently conquered by the Incas. The objective was to transfer both loyalty to the state and a cultural baggage of Inca culture such as language, technology, economic and other resources into areas that were in transition.
- 1069 - 1070 AD: The Harrying of the North resulted in as much as 75% of the Anglo-Saxon population of Northern England being killed in massacres or the ensuing famine, or expelled, leading several academics to call it a genocide.
- 1071 - 1453 AD: The Turkish invasion and settlement of Anatolia (now Turkey), caused the partial displacement of the previous Greek and Armenian inhabited populations of Anatolia.

Expulsions of Jews in Europe from 1100 to 1600

- 1200s - 1368 AD: The Mongol Empire laid waste to large parts of Eurasia, leading their actions to be called genocidal. The British historian John Joseph Saunders called the Mongol Empire "the most notorious practitioners of genocide".
  - 1202 AD: After defeating the Tatar confederation, Genghis Khan had every Tatar male taller than a linchpin executed.
- c. 1290 AD: Edward I of England expelled all Jews living in England in 1290 (see Edict of Expulsion).
- c. 1250–1500 AD: From the 13th to the 16th centuries many European countries expelled the Jews from their territory on at least 15 occasions. Spain was preceded by England, France and some German states, among many others, and succeeded by at least five more expulsions.

=== Early modern period ===
- c. 1492–1614 AD: As a result of religious persecution, up to a quarter million Jews in Spain converted to Catholicism, those who refused (between 40,000 and 70,000) were expelled in 1492 following the Alhambra Decree. Those who did convert were subject to legal discrimination under the Limpieza de sangre system, which privileged Old Christians over New Christians. Many of the converts continued practising Judaism in secret, leading to the Inquisition. Shortly after, the practice of Islam was outlawed and all of Spain's Muslims became nominally Christian. The descendants of these converted Muslims were called Moriscos. After the 1571 suppression of the Morisco Revolt in the Alpujarras region, almost 80,000 Moriscos were relocated to other parts of Spain and some 270 villages and hamlets were repopulated with settlers brought from other regions. This was followed by a general Expulsion of the Moriscos between 1609 and 1614 which was nominally applied to the entire Spanish realm, but was carried out most thoroughly in the eastern region of Valencia. Although its overall success in terms of implementation is subject to academic debate and did not involve widespread violence, it is considered one of the first episodes of state-sponsored ethnic cleansing in the modern western world.
- 1492 - 1800s: Indigenous Americans of North America and South America were dispossessed and killed (or died by introduced diseases) by British, Spanish and Portuguese colonialists and become a minority in their homelands. Raphael Lemkin, who coined the term "genocide", considered the displacement of Native Americans by American settlers as a historical example of genocide. Others, like historian Gary Anderson, contend that genocide does not accurately characterize any aspect of American history, suggesting instead that ethnic cleansing is a more appropriate term.
- 1556–1620: Plantations of Ireland. Land in Laois, Offaly, Munster and parts of Ulster was seized by the English crown and colonised with English settlers. Ireland has been described as a "testing ground" for British colonialism, with the confiscation of land and expulsion of native Irish from their homelands being a rehearsal for the expulsion of the Native Americans by British settlers.

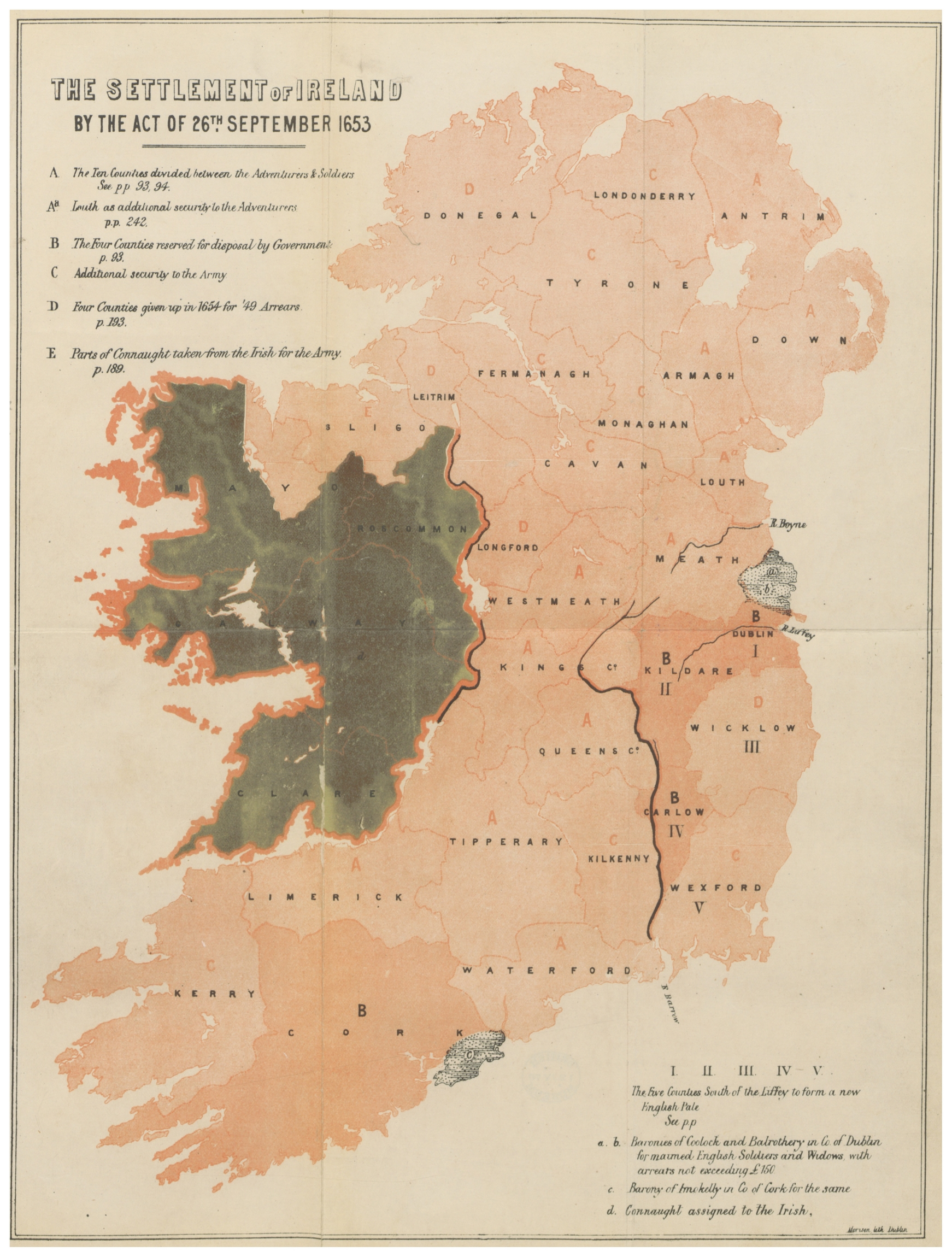
After Cromwell's conquest of Ireland, huge areas of land were confiscated and the Irish Catholics were banished to the lands of Connacht.

- c. 1652 AD: After the Cromwellian conquest of Ireland and Act of Settlement in 1652, the whole post-war Cromwellian settlement of Ireland has been characterised by historians such as Mark Levene and Alan Axelrod as ethnic cleansing, in that it sought to remove Irish Catholics from the eastern part of the country, but others such as the historian Tim Pat Coogan have described the actions of Cromwell and his subordinates as genocide.
- 1755–1757 AD: The Dzungar genocide (Chinese: 準噶爾滅族; lit. 'extermination of the Dzungar tribe') was the mass extermination of the Mongol Dzungar people by the Qing dynasty. The genocide was perpetrated by Manchu generals of the Qing army, supported by Turkic oasis dwellers (now known as Uyghurs) who rebelled against Dzungar rule. Some scholars estimate that about 80% of the Dzungar population, or around 500,000 to 800,000 people, were killed by a combination of warfare and disease during or after the Qing conquest.
- 1755–1764 AD: During the French and Indian War, the Nova Scotia colonial government, aided by New England troops, instituted a systematic removal of the French Catholic Acadian population of Nova Scotia – eventually removing thousands of settlers from the region and relocating them to areas in the Thirteen Colonies, Britain and France. Many eventually moved and settled in Louisiana and became known as Cajuns. Many scholars have described the subsequent death of over 50% of the deported Acadian population as an ethnic cleansing.
- 1788 - 1900s: Indigenous Australians are dispossessed and killed (or die of introduced diseases) by British colonialists and become a minority in their homelands.

== 19th century ==
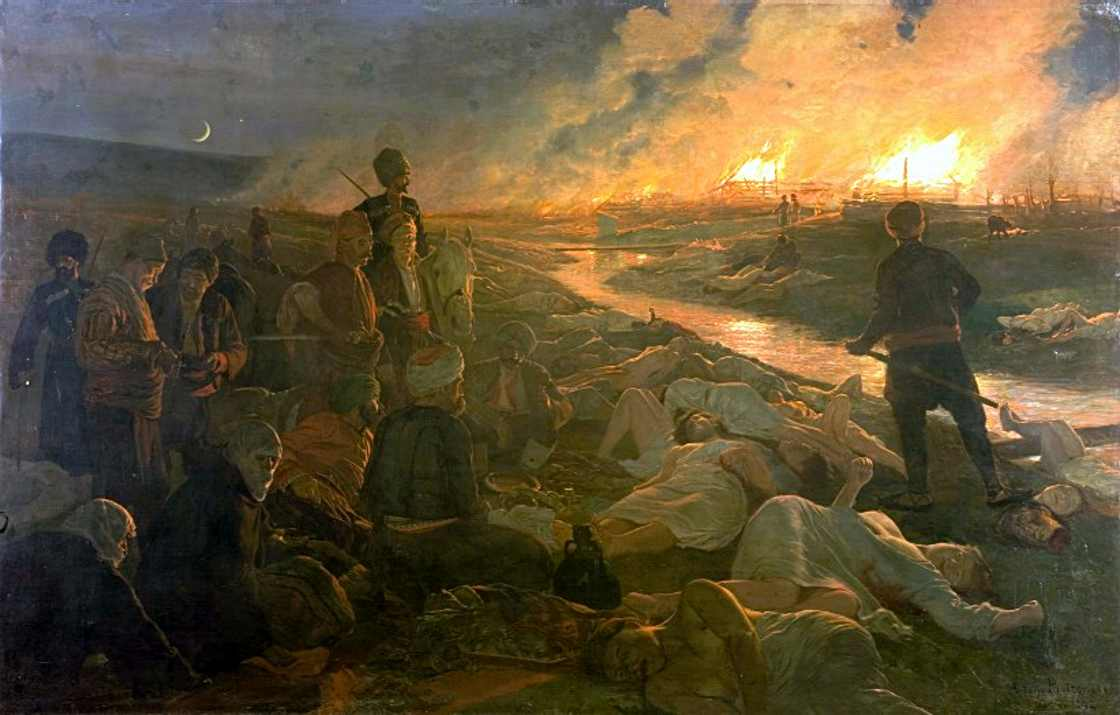
The Batak massacre, an example of ethnic cleansing by Ottoman irregular troops in Bulgaria in 1876.

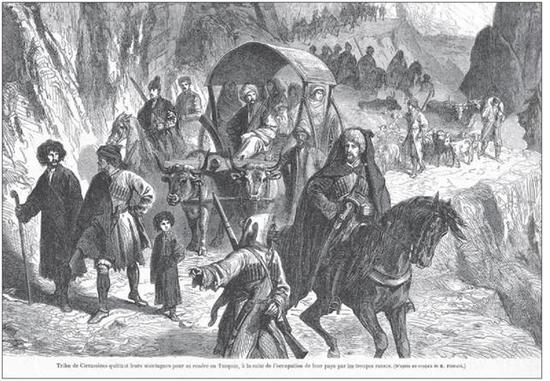
Portrait of Circassian refugees evicted from their towns and villages during the Circassian genocide. According to some authors, the Russian Empire massacred and forcibly deported 95-97% of all Circassians through military campaigns designated by the Russian army as “ochishchenie” (cleansing).

- 1804 Haiti massacre, genocide of Haiti's white population on the orders of the Haitian black general Jean-Jacques Dessalines.
- Between 1821 and 1922, a large number of Muslims were expelled from Southeast Europe as Bulgaria, Greece and Serbia gained their independence from the Ottoman Empire, with the Ottoman army then retaliating against the native Christian people. Mann describes these events as "murderous ethnic cleansing on a stupendous scale not previously seen in Europe." One example was the Greek liberation of Tripoli, Peloponnese in 1821 and slaughter of its Muslim inhabitants, with the Turks then slaughtering all Greeks of Chios Island in 1822. These countries sought to expand their territory against the Ottoman Empire, which culminated in the Balkan Wars of the early 20th century, which in turn led to the Ottoman Turkish government's ethnic cleansing of Christians in Anatolia and the Armenian genocide.
- The Russian empire perpetrated several ethnic cleansing campaigns in the Caucasus region during the 19th century. These included the Circassian genocide, which was the deadliest ethnic cleansing campaign of the 19th century. Between 1.5 and 2 million Circassians were mass murdered, and approximately 1.5 million Circassian natives were forcibly driven out of their homeland by the Russian imperial army during the 1860s.
- The Expulsion of the Albanians, 1830–1876 was the coerced and forced displacement of up to 150,000 Albanians from the Principality of Serbia. This event was the precursor to the Albanians' expulsion during the Serbian–Ottoman Wars (1876–1878).
- On 26 May 1830, president Andrew Jackson of the United States signed the Indian Removal Act which resulted in the Trail of Tears.
- In 2005, the historian Gary Clayton Anderson of the University of Oklahoma published The Conquest of Texas: Ethnic Cleansing in the Promised Land, 1830–1875. This book repudiates traditional historians, such as Walter Prescott Webb and Rupert N. Richardson, who viewed the settlement of Texas by the displacement of the native populations as a healthful development. Anderson writes that at the time of the outbreak of the American Civil War, when the population of Texas was nearly 600,000, the still-new state was "a very violent place. ... Texans mostly blamed Indians for the violence – an unfair indictment, since a series of terrible droughts had virtually incapacitated the Plains Indians, making them incapable of extended warfare."
- The Long Walk of the Navajo was the 1864 ethnic cleansing of the Navajo people by the United States federal government.
- The Russian Empire was the subject of several cases of ethnic and religious cleansing against minorities, including Catholics (Poles and Lithuanians), Lutherans (Latvians and Estonians), Jews (Pale of Settlement) and Muslims.
- The Expulsion of the Albanians, 1877–1878 refers to events of forced migration of Albanian populations from areas that became incorporated into the Principality of Serbia and Principality of Montenegro in 1878. These wars, alongside the larger Russo-Ottoman War (1877–78), ended in defeat and substantial territorial losses for the Ottoman Empire which was formalised at the Congress of Berlin. This expulsion was part of the wider persecution of Muslims in the Balkans during the geopolitical and territorial decline of the Ottoman Empire. Although most of these Albanians were expelled by Serbian forces, a small presence was allowed to remain in the Jablanica valley where their descendants live today.
- Beginning from about 1848, and extending into the 20th century, the residents of Silesia have been expelled by various governments as their homeland has come under the rule of different states.
- In the Prussian Kingdom (since 1871 part of German Empire), nearly 30,000 Poles were expelled for ethnic and religious reasons between 1885 and 1890.

== 20th century ==
=== 1900s–1910s ===
- The Herero and Namaqua genocide was a campaign of racial extermination and collective punishment that the German Empire undertook in German South West Africa (modern-day Namibia) against the Herero, Nama and San people. It is considered the first genocide of the 20th century.
- During the Balkan Wars, ethnic cleansings were carried out in Kosovo, Macedonia, Sandžak and Thrace. At first, they were committed against the Muslim population, but later, they were also committed against Christians. Villages were burned and people were massacred. The Bulgarians, Serbs and Greeks burned villages and massacred Turkish civilians. Roughly 632,000 Muslims (27% of the pre-war population in Ottoman Europe) were killed or died of starvation and disease during the conflict. Over 812,000 became refugees; in total, an estimated 1,5 Million Ottoman Muslims were either killed or forcibly exiled by the end of the wars. The Turks massacred Bulgarian and Greek as revenge killings, but they did not massacre any Greeks during the Second Balkan War. The women and children were also raped and frequently slaughtered during each massacre. In Kilkish, Doiran, and Ghevgheli, almost all leading Muslim citizens were executed and their property destroyed. During the Second Balkan War, an ethnic cleansing campaign was carried out by the Ottoman Army and Turkish Bashi-bazouks exterminated the whole Bulgarian population of the Ottoman Adrianople Vilayet (an estimated 300,000 people before the war) and displacing the survivors of the massacres (60,000). Under Greek occupation, Bulgarian Macedonians were persecuted, expelled from their homes and forced to move north of the border with Bulgaria. The Bulgarians had expelled 100,000 Greeks from Macedonia and West Thrace before the territories were returned to Greece. In addition to the dead, the aftermath of the war counts 890,000 people who permanently left their homes, of whom 400,000 fled to Turkey, 170,000 fled to Greece, 150,000 or 280,000 fled to Bulgaria. The population size of Bulgarians in Macedonia was mostly reduced by forceful assimilation campaigns through terror, following the ban of the use of the Bulgarian language and declarations which are named "Declare yourself a Serb or die"; signers were required to renounce their Bulgarian identity on paper in Serbia and Greece. Anywhere between 120,000 and 270,000 Albanians were killed through both wars and 60,000 to 300,000 were deported from Old Serbia by late 1914.
- The 1914 Greek deportations in East Thrace and Anatolia (Turkey) have been described as an ethnic cleansing campaign by scholars Matthias Bjørnlund and Taner Akçam.
- During the Bulgarian occupation of Serbia in WWI, the civilian population was exposed to various measures of repression, including mass internment, forced labor, and a Bulgarisation policy. Bulgarian policy in Macedonia, and to some degree in occupied Serbia, was motivated by what historian Alan Kramer has termed a 'dynamic of destruction' a desire not just to defeat the enemy militarily, but also to erase all traces of its culture and destroy any evidence that it had ever been there at all. Academic Paul Mojzes writes that "ethnic cleansing (at a minimum)" took place during 1915-1918.
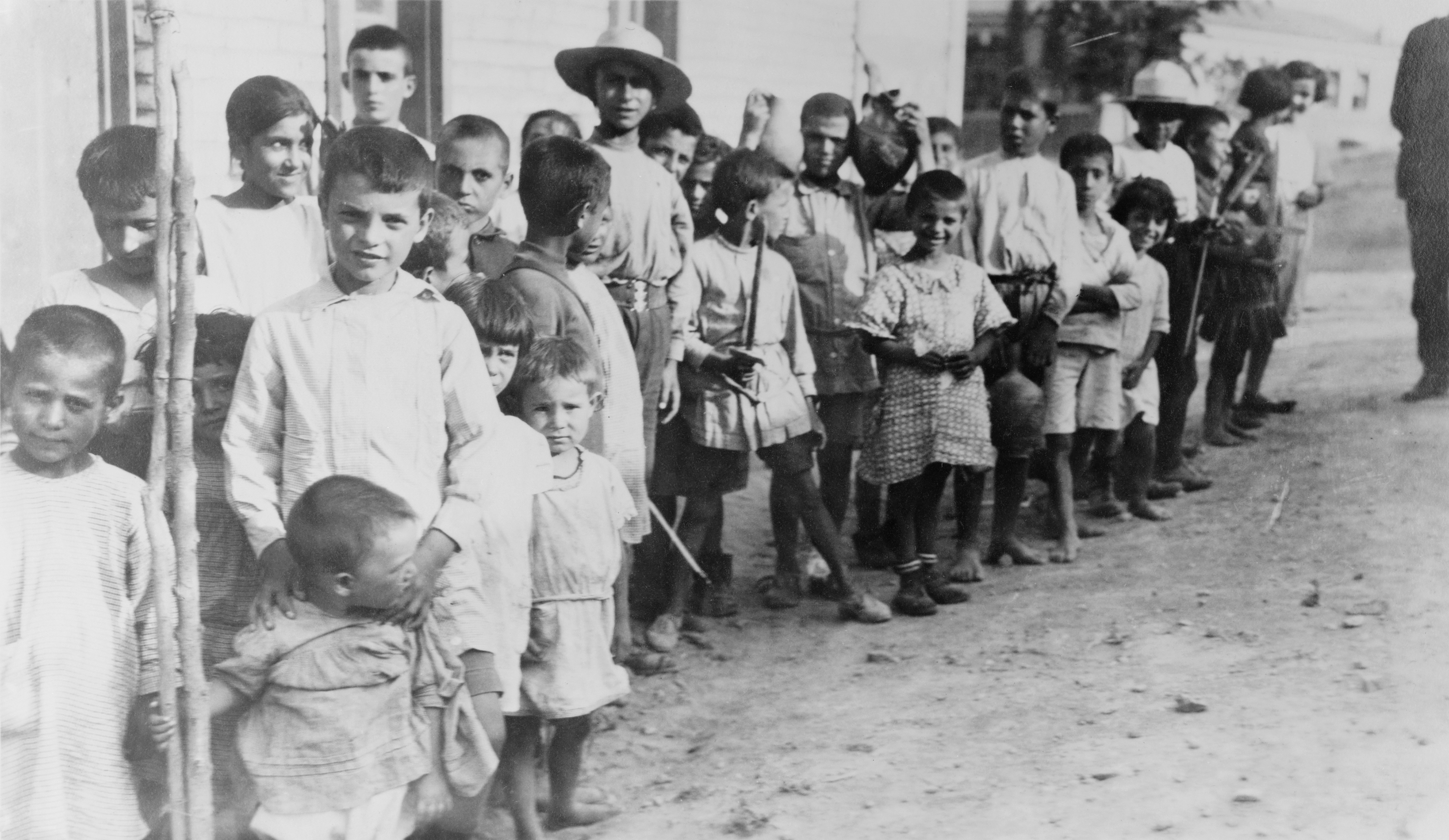
  Greek and Armenian refugee children near Athens, Greece, in 1923, following their expulsion from Turkey.
- The Armenian genocide and the Greek genocide which occurred in Anatolia (Turkey) both during and after World War I was implemented in two phases: Turks committed the wholesale killing of the entire able-bodied male population through massacres and forced labor, this killing was followed by the deportation of women, children, the elderly and the infirm to the Syrian Desert on death marches. Between 2 and 3 million Armenians, Greeks and Assyrians were killed during this period. In addition to being described as a genocide, it is often described as an ethnic cleansing campaign in academic literature. Considered a single event by some historians, this genocide was the first genocide of the 20th century and it was also the largest genocide in terms of the number of victims until the Holocaust.
- The Bolshevik regime killed or deported an estimated 300,000 to 500,000 Don Cossacks during the Russian Civil War, in 1919–1920. Geoffrey Hosking stated "It could be argued that the Red policy towards the Don Cossacks amounted to ethnic cleansing. It was short-lived, however, and soon abandoned because it did not fit with normal Leninist theory and practice".
- Through the Interwar period, between 90,000 and 300,000 Albanians were deported from the Kingdom of Yugoslavia and up to 80,000 were killed during the Yugoslav colonization of Kosovo.

=== 1920s–1930s ===
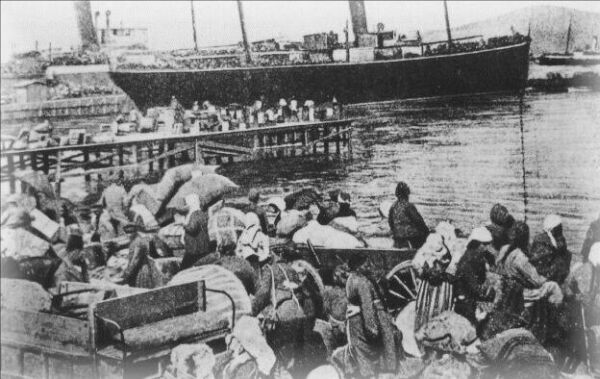
Greek refugees from Smyrna, 1922

Deportation of the Soviet Koreans in 1937

- In 1920–21, the Greek army on the Yalova-Gemlik Peninsula burned dozens of Turkish/Muslim villages, engaging in large-scale violence and ethnic cleansing.
- The population exchange between Greece and Turkey has been described as an ethnic cleansing. Over 1.2 million ethnic Greeks were expelled from Turkey in 1922-1924 while Greece expelled 400,000 Muslims. In 1928, 1,104,216 Ottoman Greek refugees were still living in Greece.
- Pacification of Libya, Italian authorities committed ethnic cleansing in the Cyrenaica region of Libya by forcibly removing and relocating 100,000 members of the Cyrenaican indigenous population from their valuable land and property that was slated to be given to Italian settlers.
- The Chinese Kuomintang Generals Ma Qi and Ma Bufang launched campaigns of expulsion in Qinghai and Tibet against ethnic Tibetans. The actions of these Generals have been called Genocidal by some authors.
- Authors Uradyn Erden Bulag called the events that follow as a Genocide while David Goodman named them ethnic cleansing: The Republic of China supported Ma Bufang when he launched seven extermination expeditions into Golog, eliminating thousands of Tibetans. Some Tibetans counted the number of times he attacked them, remembering the seventh attack which made their lives impossible. Ma was highly anti-communist, and he and his army wiped out many Tibetans in the northeast and eastern Qinghai, and they also destroyed Tibetan Buddhist Temples.
- The Mexican Repatriation from 1929 to 1939 in which mass deportations and repatriations of Mexicans and Mexican Americans occurred in response to poverty and nativist fears which were triggered by the Great Depression in the United States has been called ethnic cleansing. An estimated forty to sixty percent of the 355,000 to 2 million people who were repatriated were birthright U.S. citizens – an overwhelming number of them were children. Voluntary repatriations were much more common than deportations. Legal scholar Kevin Johnson states that it meets modern legal standards for ethnic cleansing, arguing it involved the forced removal of an ethnic minority by the government.
- The Holodomor, also known as the Ukrainian famine, was a massive man-made famine in Soviet Ukraine from 1932 to 1933 that killed millions of Ukrainians. The Holodomor was part of the wider Soviet famine of 1930–1933 which affected the major grain-producing areas of the Soviet Union. As of January 2026, 33 countries recognise the Holodomor as a genocide.
- The Simele massacre of 1933 was carried out by the Royal Iraqi Army under the command of Bakr Sidqi, as well as with the participation of Arab and Kurdish tribes. It's estimated that nearly 6,000 Assyrians perished as a result of the massacre, with 100s of villages flattened.
- The deportation of 172,000 Soviet Koreans by the Soviet government in September 1937, in which Koreans were moved away from the Korean border and deported to Central Asia, where they were made to do forced labor.

=== 1940s ===
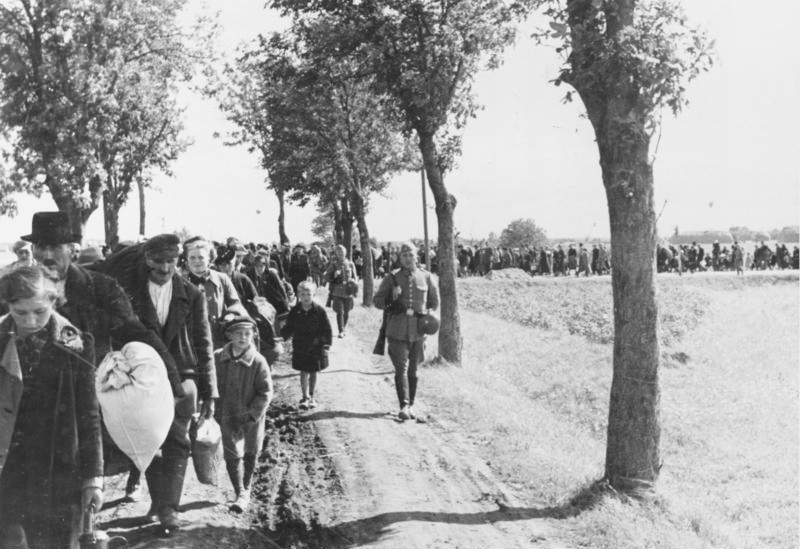
Expulsion of Poles by Nazi Germany. Poles are led to trains under German army escort, as part of the ethnic cleansing of western Poland annexed to the German Reich following the invasion.

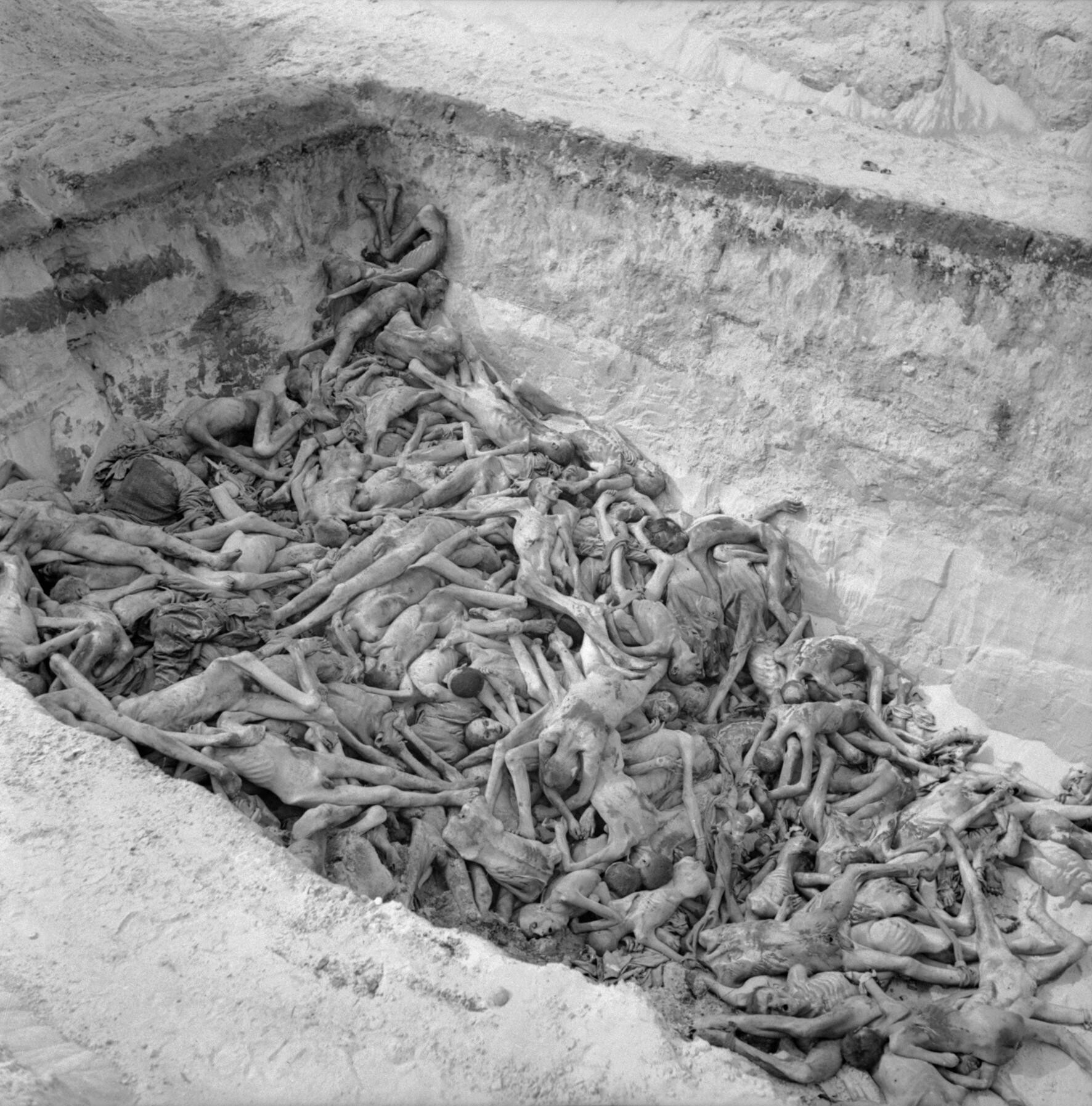
The bodies of the dead lie awaiting burial in a mass grave at the German concentration camp of Bergen-Belsen

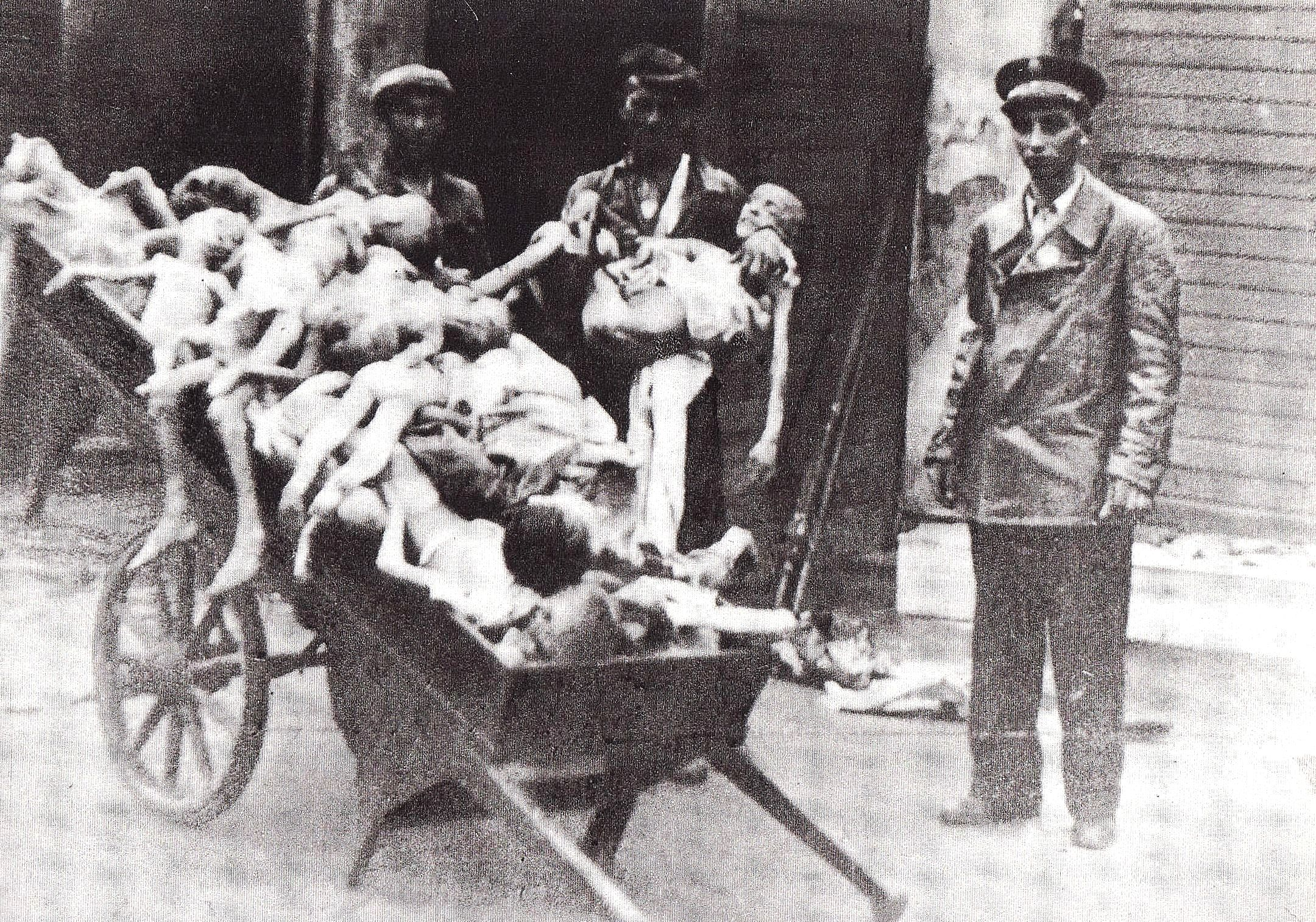
Emaciated corpses of Jewish children in the Warsaw Ghetto

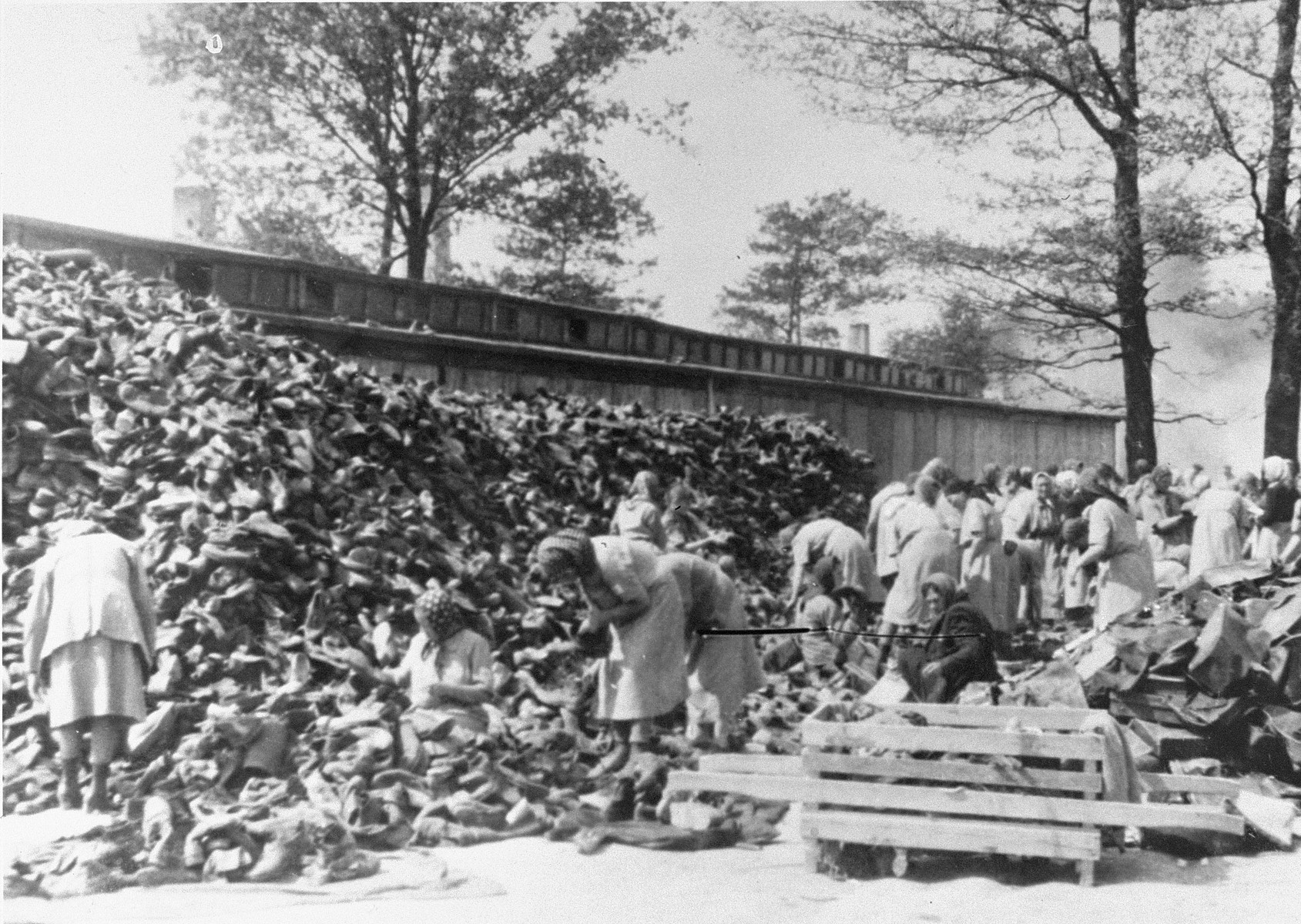
Prisoners sort through shoes thought to belong to Hungarian Jews who were murdered in the gas chambers after arrival to the Auschwitz extermination camp.

Post-World War II border changes of Poland. The respective Polish, German, and Ukrainian populations were expelled, or ethnically cleansed by the Soviet Union and Poland.

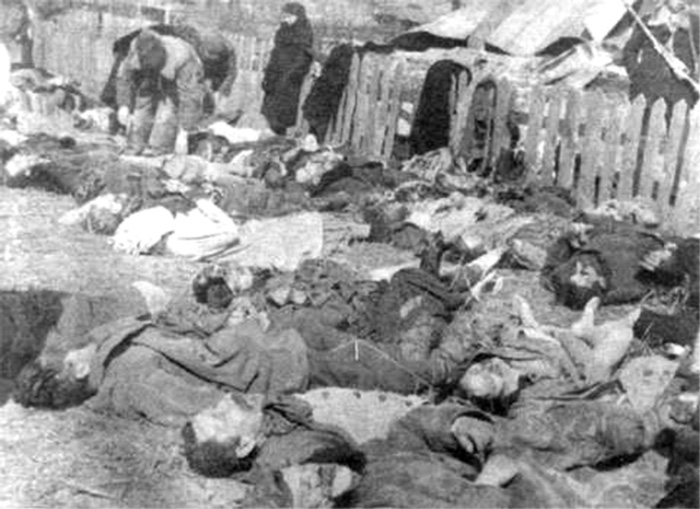
Massacres of Poles in Volhynia in 1943. Most Poles of Volhynia (now in Ukraine) had either been murdered or had fled the area.

- Nazi Germany carried out the Romani genocide or the Porajmos from 1936 to 1945: the killing of an estimated 130,565 Romani people by Nazi Germany, with some estimates ranging from 220,000 to 500,000.
- Nazi Germany carried out the Holocaust from 1938 to 1945: The murder of an estimated 6 million Jews both inside Germany and throughout German occupied territories, and some of its independent allies such as the governments of Romania, Hungary, and Bulgaria (outside Bulgarian core territories).
- Nazi Germany carried out the murder of an estimated 1.795 million non-Jewish Poles.
- Nazi Germany carried out the murder of an estimated 3,000,000 Ukrainians.
- Nazi Germany carried out the murder of an estimated 1,593,000 Russians.
- Nazi Germany carried out the murder of an estimated 1,400,000 Byelorussians.
- The Independent State of Croatia (NDH) led by the Ustaše regime carried out genocide and ethnic cleansing against Serbs, Roma, and Jews by expelling them, mass executions, and imprisonment in concentration camps such as Jasenovac. Between 200,000 and 500,000 Serbs, and approximately 25,000 Roma and 30,000 Jews were killed in the NDH.
- Chetnik atrocities against Bosniaks and Croats in Croatia and Bosnia and Herzegovina from 1941 to 1945 have been characterised as organised ethnic cleansing. It is estimated that around 32,000 Croats (20,000 from Croatia, and 12,000 from Bosnia) and 33,000 Bosniaks were killed.
- Population transfers in the Soviet Union during and after World War II on the orders of Joseph Stalin, including the deportation of the Karachays, deportation of the Balkars, deportation of the Chechens and Ingush, deportation of the Meskhetian Turks, deportation of Romanians from Bucovina and Hertsa and the deportation of the Kalmyks. Nearly 3.5 million ethnic minorities were resettled during 1940–1952.
- Towards the end of World War II, over 16,600 ethnic Albanian Muslims were expelled from the coastal region of Epirus in northwestern Greece by the EDES paramilitary organization, supported by the state.
- The expulsion of 14 million ethnic Germans from the Central and Eastern European countries of Czechoslovakia, Hungary, Poland (including former German territories annexed to it), Romania, and Yugoslavia after World War II. This policy was sanctioned by the Allies at the Potsdam Conference (though not for Romania or Yugoslavia).
- The 1945-1947 Czechoslovak deportations of ethnic Hungarians from Slovakia to Czech lands.
- In 1945, Dutch minister of Justice Hans Kolfschoten planned to forcibly deport all Germans living in the Netherlands. Ultimately, about 15% of German residents were deported.
- During the Partition of India 6 million Muslims fled ethnic violence taking place in India to settle in what became Pakistan (and by 1971, Bangladesh) and 5 million Hindus and Sikhs fled from what became Pakistan and Bangladesh, to settle in India. The events which occurred during this time period have been described as ethnic cleansing by Ishtiaq Ahmed and by Barbara and Thomas R. Metcalf.
- In 1947, the Istrian–Dalmatian exodus took place. It was an ethnic cleansing operated by Josip Broz Tito's Yugoslavian communist partisans against Istrian Italians and Dalmatian Italians which forced 230,000-350,000 Italians to flee the former territories of the Kingdom of Italy towards Italy, and in smaller numbers, towards the Americas, Australia and South Africa. From 1947, after the war, they were subject by Yugoslav authorities to less violent forms of intimidation, such as nationalization, expropriation, and discriminatory taxation, which gave them little option other than emigration. In 1953, there were 36,000 declared Italians in Yugoslavia, just about 16% of the original Italian population before World War II. The type of attack was state terrorism and ethnic cleansing against Italians.
- In 1947, the Jammu Massacre took place. The event has been described as ethnic cleansing of Muslims in the Jammu region of Jammu and Kashmir.

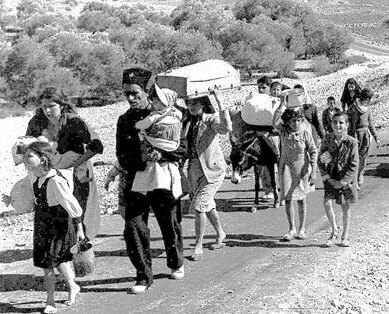
Between 1947 and 1949, at least 750,000 Palestinians were expelled from their homes or made to flee from what is now Israel in an event called the Nakba.

- The 1948 Palestinian expulsion and flight, part of the Nakba and the 1948 Palestine war, was the expulsion of much of the native Arab population of Palestine. It has been considered to be ethnic cleansing by many scholars, including Ilan Pappé, Mark Levene, Ronit Lentin, Derek Penslar, Yair Auron, Alon Confino and others. (Note: Laila Parsons, McGill University, 2009, Review of Ilan Pappé's 'The Ethnic Cleansing of Palestine', "Ilan Pappe has added another work to the many that have already been written in English on the 1948 Arab-Israeli War and the expulsion of more than 750,000 Palestinians from their homes. These include works by Walid Khalidi, Simha Flapan, Nafez Nazzal, Benny Morris, Nur Masalha, and Norman Finkelstein, among others. All but one of these authors (Morris) would probably agree with Pappe’s position that what happened to the Palestinians in 1948 fits the definition of ethnic cleansing, and it certainly is not news to Palestinians themselves, who have always known what happened to them.") Pappé wrote that the ethnic cleansing was enacted by operations such as Plan Dalet. For more information see list of towns and villages depopulated during the 1947–1949 Palestine war, list of estimates of the 1948 Palestinian expulsion and flight, and causes of the 1948 Palestinian expulsion and flight.

=== 1950s ===
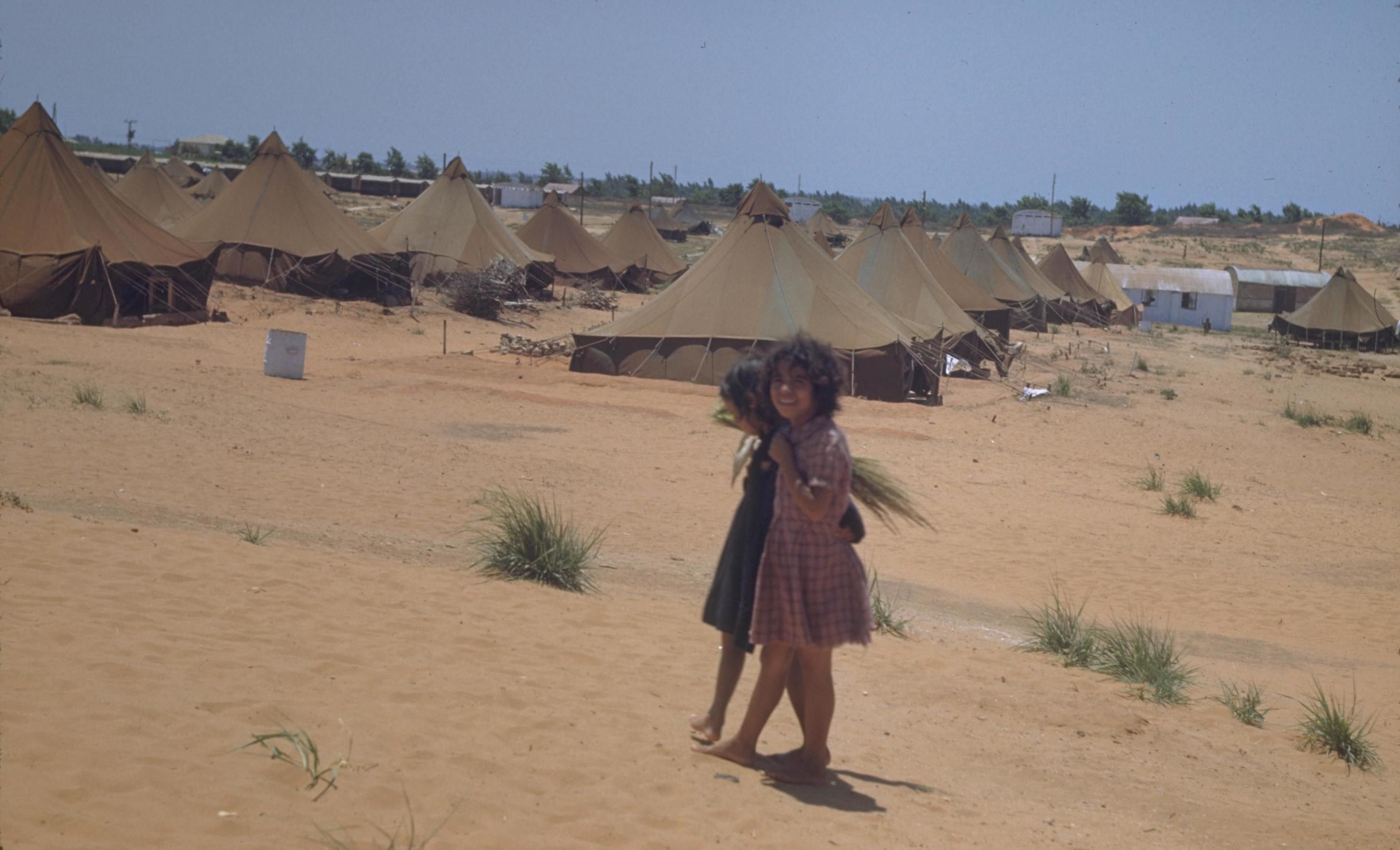
A colour photograph of two young Yemenite Jews in Ma'abarot refugee camps.

- In 1950–1951 over 150,000 Turks were forcefully evicted from Bulgaria.
- From 5–6 September 1955, the Istanbul pogrom or "Septembrianá"/"Σεπτεμβριανά", secretly backed by the Turkish government, was launched against the Greek population of Istanbul. The mob also attacked some Jewish and Armenian residents of the city. The event contributed greatly to the gradual extinction of the Greek minority in the city and throughout the entire country, which numbered 100,000 in 1924 after the Turko-Greek population exchange treaty. By 2006 there were only 2,500 Greeks living in Istanbul.
- The Jewish exodus from Muslim countries, the flight of over 1 million Jews of the Islamic world, mainly Mizrahi and Sephardic. Many Arab governments, such as Gaddafi's Libya, Nasserist Egypt, and Hafez al-Assad's Syria, confiscated Jewish bank accounts and property of Jews who had departed, in addition to placing laws restricting Jewish business. The episode is sometimes labelled one of ethnic cleansing.

=== 1960s ===
- On 5 July 1960, five days after the Congo gained independence from Belgium, the Force Publique garrison near Léopoldville mutinied against its white officers and attacked numerous European targets. This caused fear among the approximately 100,000 whites still resident in the Congo and led to their mass exodus from the country.
- Ne Win's rise to power in 1962 and his relentless persecution of "resident aliens" (immigrant groups not recognised as citizens of the Union of Burma) led to an exodus of some 300,000 Burmese Indians. They migrated to escape racial discrimination and wholesale nationalisation of private enterprises a few years later in 1964.
- The 1962 Rajshahi massacres in East Pakistan (modern-day Bangladesh) witnessed the killing of minorities, mostly Buddhists and Hindus, by Muslims. More than 3,000 non-Muslims were killed. In 1958, Ayub Khan came to power in Pakistan, and from the beginning the policy of the Ayub Regime was to cleanse East Pakistan of Bengali Hindus and other minorities. There was also arson, rapes, and looting. This ethnic cleansing campaign resulted in the migration of 11,000 Santhals and Rajbanshis to India.
- In 1964, the 1964 East Pakistan riots occurred which resulted in more than 10,000 Bengali Hindus being targeted and systematically killed by Bengali Muslims. In the village of Mainam near Nagaon in Rajshahi District all Hindus except 2 little girls were massacred. This resulted in more than 135,000 refugees. Hundreds of villages around Dhaka city were burnt to ashes. This left more than 100,000 Hindus homeless. 95% of the ruined houses belonged to Hindus who lived in Old Dhaka.
- In 1967, during the Six-Day War, between 280,000 and 325,000 Palestinians were displaced from the West Bank and Gaza Strip (the Naksa), partly as a result of direct expulsions and the intentional destruction of villages by the Israeli military.
- The expulsion of the Chagossians from the Chagos Archipelago by the United Kingdom, at the request of the United States to establish a military base, started in 1968 and concluded in 1973.

=== 1970s ===
- The Arab Belt program was an ethnic cleansing campaign which was waged by the Ba'athist Syrian government of Hafez al-Assad between 1973 and 1976. By implementing its Arab Belt programme, the Syrian government sought to change the demographics of the northern parts of the Al-Hasakah region by sending Arab settlers, and changing the ethnic composition of the population in favor of Arabs to the detriment of other ethnic groups, particularly the Syrian Kurds. By the end of the programme in 1976, Syrian government forcibly deported approximately 140,000 Kurds who lived in 332 villages and confiscated their lands around a 180-mile strip across the north-eastern boundary-regions of Syria with Turkey and Iraq. Then, tens of thousands of Arab settlers who came from Raqqa were granted these lands and allowed to establish settlements on it by the Ba'athist government.
- There was an ethnic cleansing of the Greek population of the areas under Turkish military occupation in Cyprus in 1974–76 during and after the Turkish invasion of Cyprus. This has been the subject of litigation in the European Court of Human Rights in cases including Loizidou v. Turkey and the European Court of Justice in cases like Apostolides v Orams.
- Following the U.S. withdrawal from South Vietnam in 1973 and the communist victory two years later, the Kingdom of Laos's coalition government was overthrown by the communists. The Hmong people, who had actively supported Laos's anti-communist government, were targeted for retaliation and persecution. The government that replaced the monarchy in Laos has been accused of committing a Genocide against the Hmong, in which as many as 100,000 Hmong have been killed.
- The Communist Khmer Rouge government in Cambodia disproportionately targeted ethnic minority groups, including ethnic Chinese, Vietnamese and Thais. In the late 1960s, an estimated 425,000 ethnic Chinese lived in Cambodia; by 1984, as a result of Khmer Rouge genocide and emigration, only about 61,400 Chinese remained in the country. The small Thai minority along the border was almost completely exterminated, with only a few thousand managing to reach safety in Thailand. The Muslim Cham Minority was subjected to intense purges in which as many as 80% of the Chams were exterminated. The Khmer Rouge's racial supremacist ideology was the motive for this ethnic purge. A Khmer Rouge order stated that henceforth "The Cham nation no longer exists on Kampuchean soil belonging to the Khmers" (U.N. Doc. A.34/569 at 9).
- Subsequent waves of hundreds of thousands of Rohingya fled Burma and many refugees inundated neighbouring Bangladesh including 250,000 in 1978 as a result of the Operation Dragon King in Arakan.

=== 1980s ===
- The forced assimilation campaign during 1984–1985 directed against ethnic Turks by the Bulgarian State resulted in the mass emigration of some 360,000 Bulgarian Turks to Turkey in 1989 has been characterized as ethnic cleansing.
- In 1985, Bedoon living in Kuwait were reclassified as illegal residents. Since then, they've been subject to deportation, ill-treatment, massacres, and systemic oppression which has been described as ethnic-cleansing and genocide.
- In May 1985, following an armed incident near the Niger-Libya border, all non-Nigerien Tuaregs were expelled from the country.
- In 1989 Uzbek nationalists attacked Meskhetian Turkish minority causing Fergana Valley massacre. 112 people were killed, 1032 injured, 17,000 Meskhetian Turks were evacuated immediately by Soviet troops and 60,000 Meskhetian Turks left Uzbekistan.
- The Nagorno-Karabakh conflict has resulted in the displacement of populations from both sides. Among the displaced are 700,000 Azerbaijanis and several Kurds from ethnic Armenian-controlled territories including Armenia and areas of Nagorno-Karabakh, more than 353,000 Armenians were forced to flee from territories controlled by Azerbaijan plus some 80,000 had to flee Armenian border territories.

=== 1990s ===
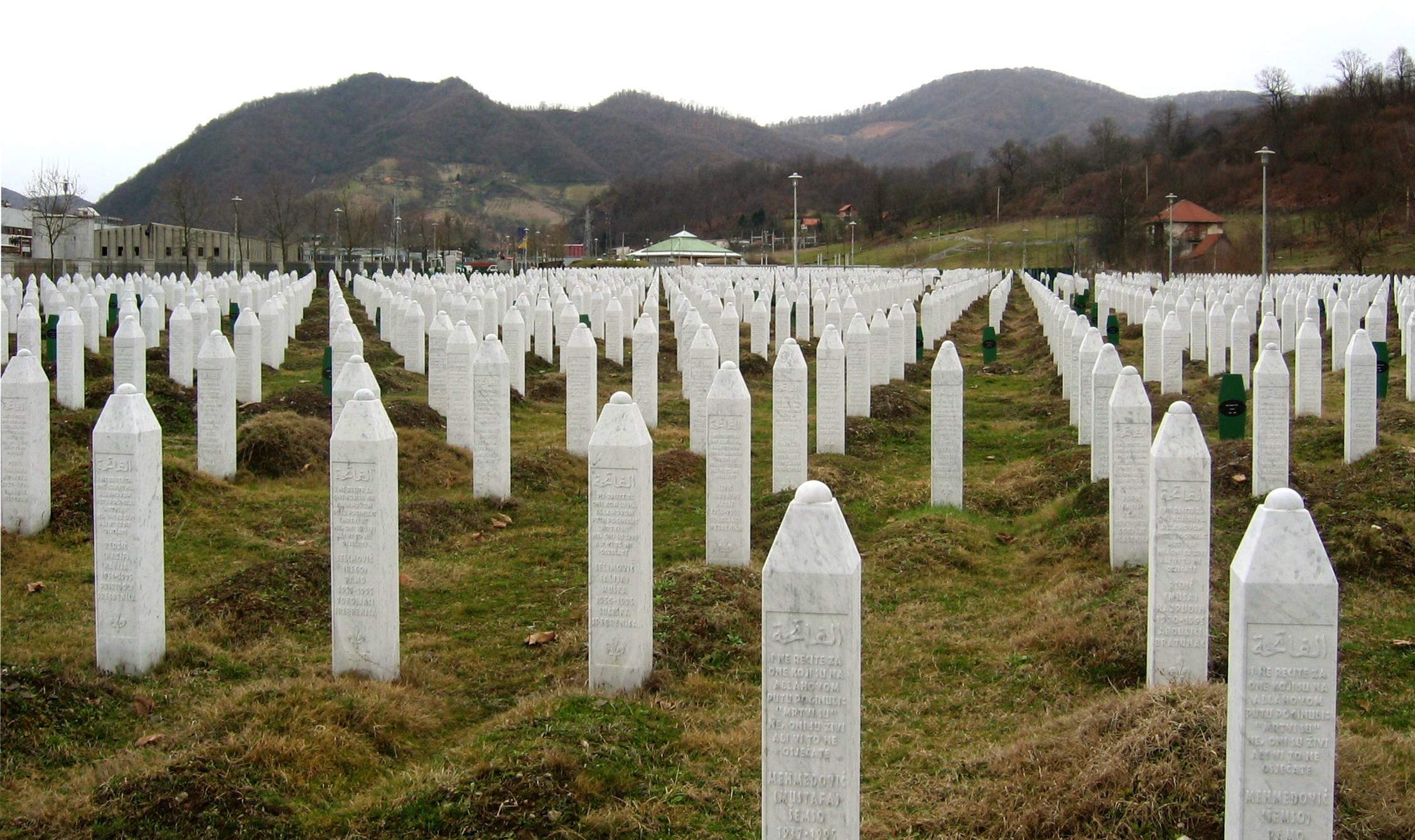
The cemetery at the Srebrenica-Potočari Memorial and Cemetery to Genocide Victims

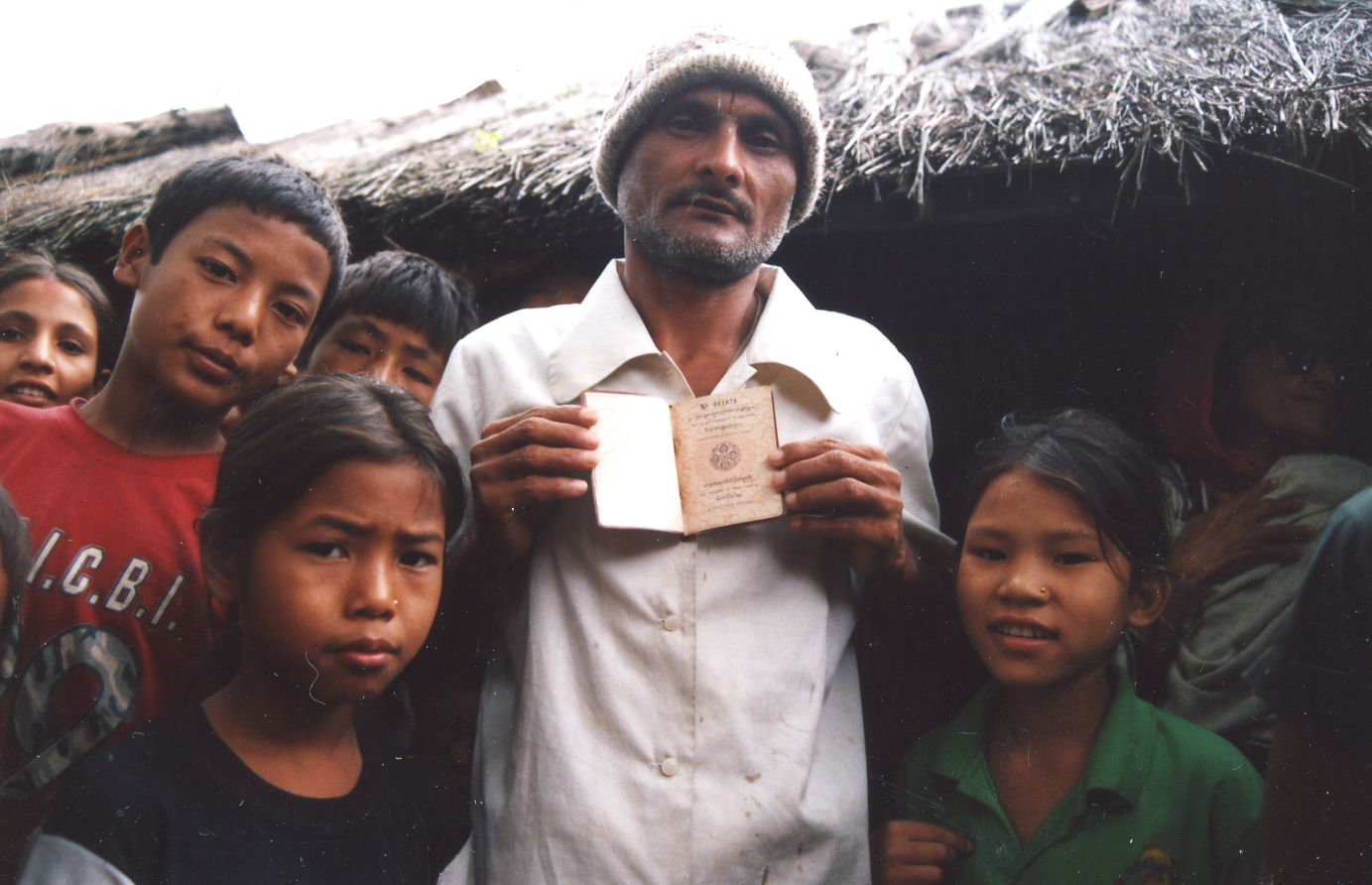
Bhutanese refugees in Nepal

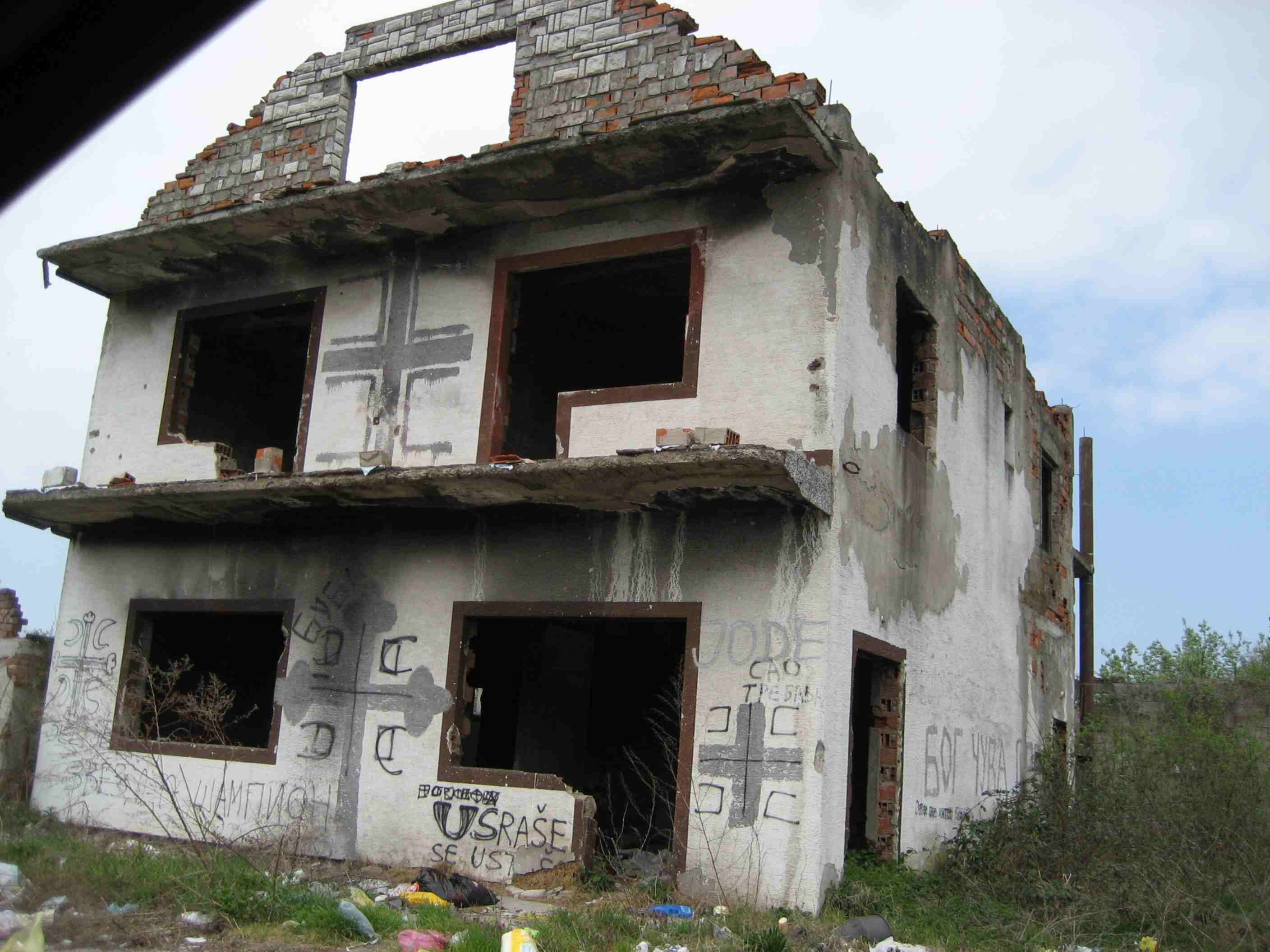
Ethnic cleansing of a Croatian home

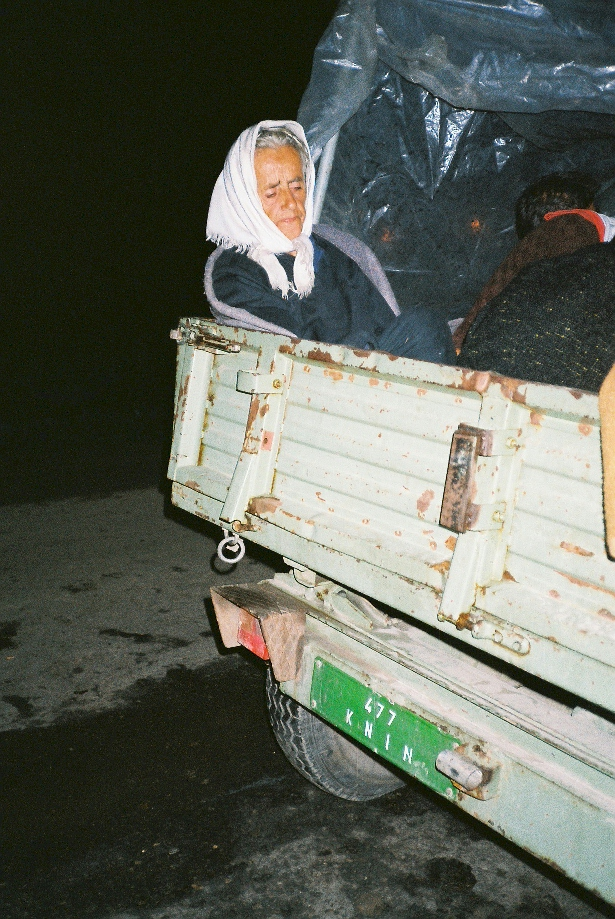
An elderly Serb refugee in a tractor trailer leaving her home during Operation Storm

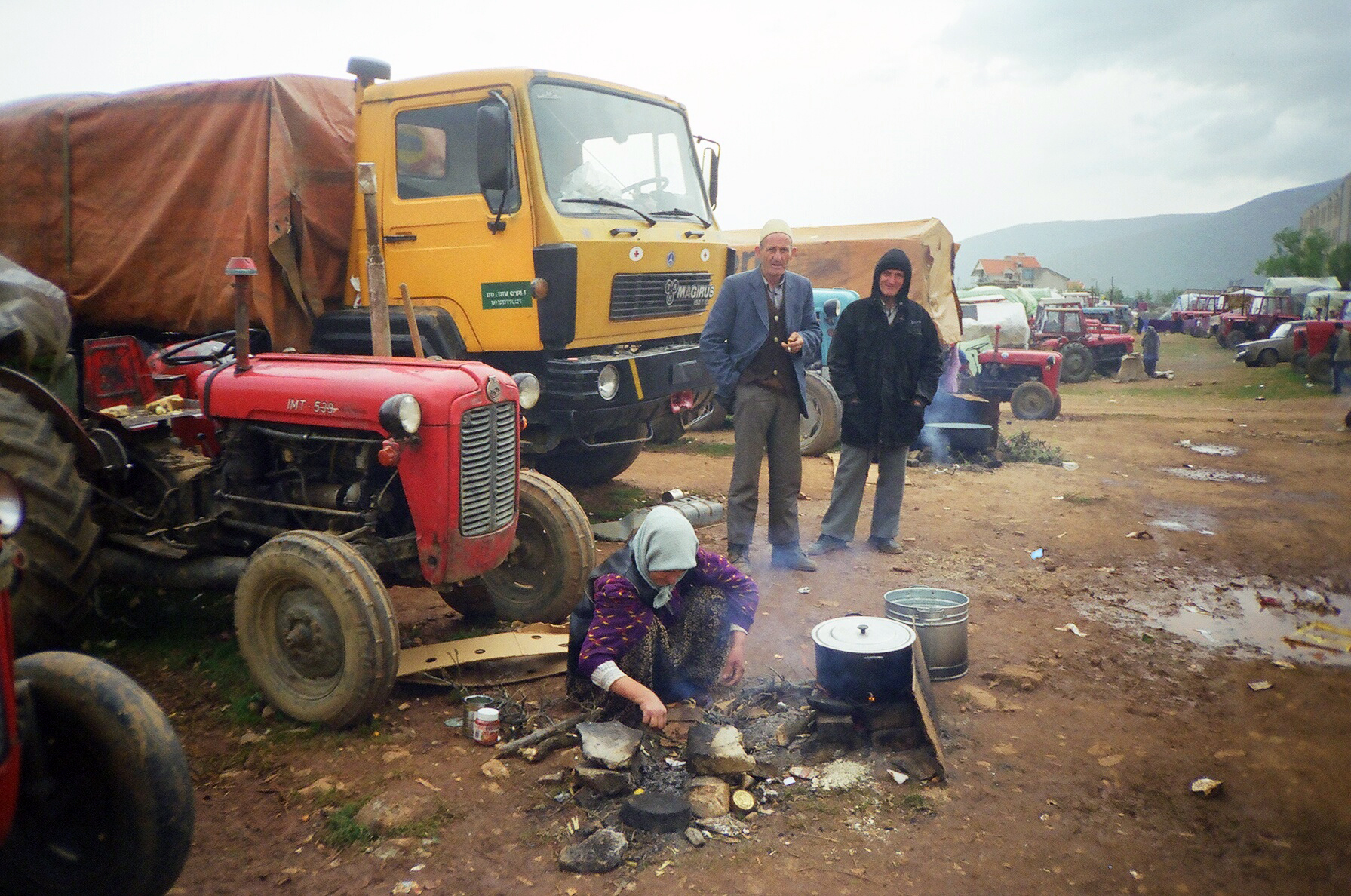
Kosovo Albanian refugees in 1999

- In 1990, inter-ethnic tensions escalated in Bhutan, resulting in the flight of many Lhotshampa, or ethnic Nepalis, from Bhutan to Nepal, many of whom were expelled by the Bhutanese military. By 1996, over 100,000 Bhutanese refugees were living in refugee camps in Nepal. Many have since been resettled in Western nations. One reason for this expulsion was the desire of the Bhutanese government to remove a largely Hindu population and preserve its Buddhist culture and identity.
- In 1991, as part of the First Nagorno-Karabakh War, during Operation Ring, Soviet troops and the predominantly Azerbaijani soldiers in the AzSSR OMON and army forcibly uprooted Armenians living in the 24 villages strewn across Shahumyan to leave their homes and settle elsewhere in Nagorno-Karabakh or in the neighboring Armenian SSR. Human rights organizations documented a wide number of human rights violations and abuses committed by Soviet and Azerbaijani forces and many of them properly characterised them as ethnic cleansing. These violations and abuses included forced deportations of civilians, unlawful killings, torture, kidnapping harassment, rape and the wanton seizure or destruction of property. Despite fierce protests, no measures were taken either to prevent the human rights abuses or to punish the perpetrators. Approximately 17,000 Armenians living in twenty-three of Shahumyan's villages were deported out of the region.
- In 1991, following a major crackdown on Rohingya Muslims in Burma, 250,000 refugees took shelter in the Cox's Bazar district of neighboring Bangladesh.
- After the Gulf War in 1991, Kuwait conducted a campaign of expulsion against the Palestinians living in the country, who before the war had numbered 400,000. Some 200,000 who had fled during the Iraqi occupation were banned from returning, while the remaining 200,000 were pressured into leaving by the authorities, who conducted a campaign of terror, violence, and economic pressure to get them to leave. The Kuwaiti Palestinians expelled from Kuwait moved to Jordan, where they had citizenship.
- As a result of the 1991–1992 South Ossetia War, about 100,000 ethnic Ossetians fled South Ossetia and Georgia proper, most across the border into North Ossetia. A further 23,000 ethnic Georgians fled South Ossetia and settled in other parts of Georgia.
- According to Helsinki Watch, the campaign of ethnic-cleansing was orchestrated by the Ossetian militants, during the events of the Ossetian–Ingush conflict, which resulted in the expulsion of approximately 60,000 Ingush inhabitants from Prigorodny District.
- The widespread ethnic cleansing accompanying the Croatian War of Independence that was committed by Serb-led Yugoslav People's Army (JNA) and rebel militia in the occupied areas of Croatia (self-proclaimed Republic of Serbian Krajina) (1991–1995). Large numbers of Croats and non-Serbs were removed, either by murder, deportation or by being forced to flee. According to the ICTY indictment against Slobodan Milošević, estimates of the total number of expelled Croats and other non-Serbs during the Croatian War of Independence range between 170,000 (ICTY), to 250,000 (Human Rights Watch), in addition to an estimated 10,000 Croats who were also killed. Also, around 10,000 or more Croats left Vojvodina in 1992 due to persecution by Serb nationalists. Milan Martić, Milan Babić, Vojislav Šešelj, Jovica Stanišić and Franko Simatović were convicted by the International Criminal Tribunal for the former Yugoslavia (ICTY) or Mechanism for International Criminal Tribunals (MICT) for persecution on racial, ethnic or religious ground, deportation and/or forcible displacement as a crime against humanity.
- In February 1992, hundreds of ethnic Azeris and Meskhetian Turks were massacred as Armenian troops captured the city of Khojaly in Nagorno-Karabakh.
- Widespread ethnic cleansing accompanied the War in Bosnia (1992–1995). Large numbers of Croats and Bosniaks were forced to flee their homes by the Army of the Republika Srpska, and on a more restricted scale and in lesser numbers, Serbs and Bosniaks by the Croatian Defence Council. Beginning in 1991, political upheavals in the Balkans displaced about 2,700,000 people by mid-1992, of which over 700,000 sought asylum in other parts of Europe. In September 1994, UNHCR representatives estimated around 80,000 non-Serbs out of 837,000 who initially lived on the Serb-controlled territory of Bosnia and Herzegovina before the war remained there; an estimated removal of 90% of the Bosniak and Croat inhabitants of Serb-coveted territory, almost all of whom were deliberately forced out of their homes. It also includes ethnic cleansing of non-Croats in the breakaway state the Croatian Republic of Herzeg-Bosnia. The ICTY convicted several officials for persecution, forced transfer and/or deportation, including Momčilo Krajišnik, Radoslav Brđanin, Stojan Župljanin, Mićo Stanišić, Biljana Plavšić, Jovica Stanišić. Franko Simatović, Radovan Karadžić and Ratko Mladić.
- The Rwandan genocide occurred from 7 April to 19 July 1994 during the Rwandan Civil War. Over a span of around 100 days, members of the Tutsi ethnic group, as well as some moderate Hutu and Twa, were systematically killed by Hutu militias. While the Rwandan Constitution states that over 1 million people were killed, most scholarly estimates suggest between 500,000 and 662,000 Tutsi died, mostly men. The genocide amounted to ethnic cleansing. It was marked by extreme violence, with victims often murdered by neighbours, and widespread sexual violence, with between 250,000 and 500,000 women raped. The genocide was rooted in long-standing ethnic tensions, most recently from the Rwandan Hutu Revolution from 1959 to 1962, which resulted in Rwandan Tutsi fleeing to Uganda due to the ethnic violence that had occurred. Hostilities were then exacerbated further due to the Rwandan Civil War, which began in 1990 when the Rwandan Patriotic Front (RPF), a predominantly Tutsi rebel group, invaded Rwanda from Uganda. The war reached a tentative peace with the Arusha Accords in 1993. However, the assassination of President Juvénal Habyarimana on 6 April 1994 ignited the genocide, as Hutu extremists used the power vacuum to target Tutsi and moderate Hutu leaders.
- Exodus of between 100,000 and 200,000 Krajina Serbs during and after the Croatian Army's Operation Storm. Some investigators and academics describe this event as ethnic cleansing. Historian Marko Attila Hoare disagrees that the operation was an act of ethnic cleansing, and points out that the Krajina Serb leadership evacuated the civilian population as a response to the Croatian offensive; whatever their intentions, the Croatians never had the chance to organise their removal. The ICTY indicted Croatian generals Ante Gotovina, Ivan Čermak and Mladen Markač for war crimes for their roles in the operation, charging them with participating in a joint criminal enterprise (JCE) aimed at the permanent removal of Serbs from the Republic of Serbian Krajina (RSK) held part of Croatia. Gotovina and Markač were convicted and Čermak was acquitted in April 2011. In November 2012, the ICTY Appeals Chamber acquitted Gotovina and Markač, reversing its earlier judgement by a 3–2 decision. The Appeals Chamber ruled that there was insufficient evidence to conclude the existence of a joint criminal enterprise to remove Serb civilians by force and further stated that while the Croatian Army and Special Police committed crimes after the artillery assault, the state and military leadership could not be held responsible for their planning and creation.
- At least 700,000 Kosovo Albanians were deported from Kosovo between 1998 and 1999 during the Kosovo War. The ICTY convicted several officials for persecution, forced displacement and/or deportation, including Nikola Šainović, Dragoljub Ojdanić and Nebojša Pavković.
- In the aftermath of Kosovo War between 200,000 and 250,000 Serbs and other non-Albanians fled Kosovo.
- The forced displacement and ethnic cleansing of more than 250,000 people, mostly Georgians but some others too, from Abkhazia during the conflict and after in 1993 and 1998.
- The mass expulsion of southern Lhotshampas (Bhutanese of Nepalese origin) by the northern Drukpa majority in Bhutan in 1990. The number of refugees is approximately 103,000.
- The expulsion of Brus in Mizoram occurred due ethnic tension and disenfranchisement. It oversaw the expulsion of 35000-40000 Bru people in Mizoram following ethnic riots. The Bru people formed refugee camps out of state in poor conditions and have been largely unsuccessful in repatriation.
- The May 1998 riots of Indonesia targeted many Chinese Indonesians. Suffering from looting and arson, many Chinese Indonesians fled from Indonesia.
- There have been serious outbreaks of inter-ethnic violence on the island of Kalimantan since 1997, involving the indigenous Dayak peoples and immigrants from the island of Madura. In 2001 in the Central Kalimantan town of Sampit, at least 500 Madurese were killed and up to 100,000 Madurese were forced to flee. Some Madurese bodies were decapitated in a ritual reminiscent of the headhunting tradition of the Dayaks of old.
- From the end of the Kosovo War in June 1999, about 80% of Kosovo's Romanis were expelled, amounting to approximately 100,000 expellees. For the 1999–2006 period, the European Roma Rights Centre documented numerous crimes perpetrated by Kosovo's ethnic Albanians with the purpose to purge the region of its Romani population along with other non-Albanian ethnic communities. These crimes included murder, abduction and illegal detention, torture, rape, arson, confiscation of houses and other property and forced labour. Whole Romani settlements were burned to the ground by Albanians. The Romani community of Kosovo is regarded to be, for the most part, annihilated.

== 21st century ==
=== 2000s ===
- In 2003, Sinafasi Makelo, a representative of Mbuti Pygmies, told the UN's Indigenous People's Forum that during the Congo Civil War, his people were hunted down and eaten as though they were game animals. Both sides of the war regarded them as "subhuman" and some say their flesh can confer magical powers. Makelo asked the UN Security Council to recognize cannibalism as a crime against humanity and an act of genocide.
- From the late 1990s to the early 2000s, Indonesian paramilitaries organized and armed by Indonesian military and police killed or expelled large numbers of civilians in East Timor. After the East Timorese people voted for independence in a 1999 referendum, Indonesian paramilitaries retaliated, murdering Separatists and levelling most towns. More than 200,000 people either fled or were forcibly taken to Indonesia before East Timor achieved full independence.
- Since the mid-1990s the central government of Botswana has been trying to move the San people, also known as Bushmen, out of the Central Kalahari Game Reserve. As of October 2005, the government has resumed its policy of forcing all San off their lands in the Game Reserve, using armed police and threats of violence or death. Many of the involuntarily displaced San live in squalid resettlement camps and some have resorted to prostitution and alcoholism, while about 250 others remain or have surreptitiously returned to the Kalahari to resume their independent lifestyle. Festus Mogae defended the actions, saying, "How can we continue to have Stone Age creatures in an age of computers?"
- From 2003 to 2020, Sudan has been widely accused of carrying out a Genocide Campaign against several black ethnic groups in Darfur, in response to a rebellion by Africans alleging mistreatment. Sudanese irregular militia known as the Janjaweed and Sudanese military and police forces killed an estimated 200,000, expelled around two million, and burned 800 villages. A 14 July 2007 article noted that in the previous two months up to 75,000 Arabs from Chad and Niger crossed the border into Darfur. Most were relocated by the Sudanese government to former villages of displaced non-Arab people. Some 200,000 were killed and 2.5 million were forced to flee to refugee camps in Chad after their homes and villages were destroyed.
- At least one additional thousand Serbs fled their homes during the 2004 unrest in Kosovo and numerous religious and cultural objects were burned down.
- During the Iraq Civil War and consequent Iraqi insurgency (2011–2013), entire neighborhoods in Baghdad were ethnically cleansed by Shia and Sunni militias. Some areas were evacuated by every member of a particular group due to lack of security, moving into new areas because of fear of reprisal killings. As of 21 June 2007, the United Nations High Commissioner for Refugees estimated that 2.2 million Iraqis had been displaced to neighboring countries, and 2 million were displaced internally, with nearly 100,000 Iraqis fleeing to Syria and Jordan each month.
- The Assyrian exodus from Iraq from 2003 until present is often described as ethnic cleansing. Although Iraqi Christians represent less than 5% of the total Iraqi population, they make up 40% of the refugees now living in nearby countries, according to UNHCR. In the 16th century, Christians constituted half of Iraq's population. In 1987, the last Iraqi census counted 1.4 million Christians. Following the 2003 invasion and the resultant growth of militant Islamism, Christians' total numbers slumped to about 500,000, of whom 250,000 live in Baghdad. Furthermore, the Mandaean and Yazidi communities are at the risk of elimination due to the ongoing atrocities by Islamic extremists. A 25 May 2007 article noted that in the past 7 months only 69 people from Iraq had been granted refugee status in the United States.
- In October 2006, Niger announced that it would deport Arabs living in the Diffa region of eastern Niger to Chad. This population numbered about 150,000. Nigerien government forces forcibly rounded up Arabs in preparation for deportation, during which two girls died, reportedly after fleeing government forces, and three women suffered miscarriages. Niger's government eventually suspended the plan.
- In 1950, the Karen had become the largest of 20 minority groups participating in an insurgency against the military dictatorship in Burma. The conflict continues as of 2008. In 2004, the BBC, citing aid agencies, estimates that up to 200,000 Karen have been driven from their homes during decades of war, with 120,000 more refugees from Burma, mostly Karen, living in refugee camps on the Thai side of the border. Many accuse the military government of Burma of ethnic cleansing. As a result of the ongoing war in minority group areas more than two million people have fled Burma to Thailand.
- Civil unrest in Kenya erupted in December 2007. By 28 January 2008, the death toll from the violence was at around 800. The United Nations estimated that as many as 600,000 people have been displaced. A government spokesman claimed that Odinga's supporters were "engaging in ethnic cleansing".
- The 2008 attacks on North Indians in Maharashtra began on 3 February 2008. Incidences of violence against North Indians and their property were reported in Mumbai, Pune, Aurangabad, Beed, Nashik, Amravati, Jalna and Latur. Nearly 25,000 North Indian workers fled Pune, and another 15,000 fled Nashik in the wake of the attacks.
- In May 2008, xenophobic riots erupted in South Africa. Within three weeks 80,000 were displaced and 62 killed, with 670 injured in the violence when South Africans ejected non-nationals in a nationwide ethnic cleansing/xenophobic outburst. The most affected foreigners were Somalis, Ethiopians, Indians, Pakistanis, Zimbabweans and Mozambiqueans. Local South Africans were also caught up in the violence. Arvin Gupta, a senior UNHCR protection officer, said the UNHCR did not agree with the City of Cape Town that those displaced by the violence should be held at camps across the city.
- In August 2008, the 2008 South Ossetia war broke out when Georgia launched a military offensive against South Ossetian separatists, leading to military intervention by Russia, during which Georgian forces were expelled from the separatist territories of South Ossetia and Abkhazia. During the fighting, 15,000 ethnic Georgians living in South Ossetia were forced to flee to Georgia proper, and Ossetian militias burned their villages to the ground to prevent their return.

=== 2010s ===
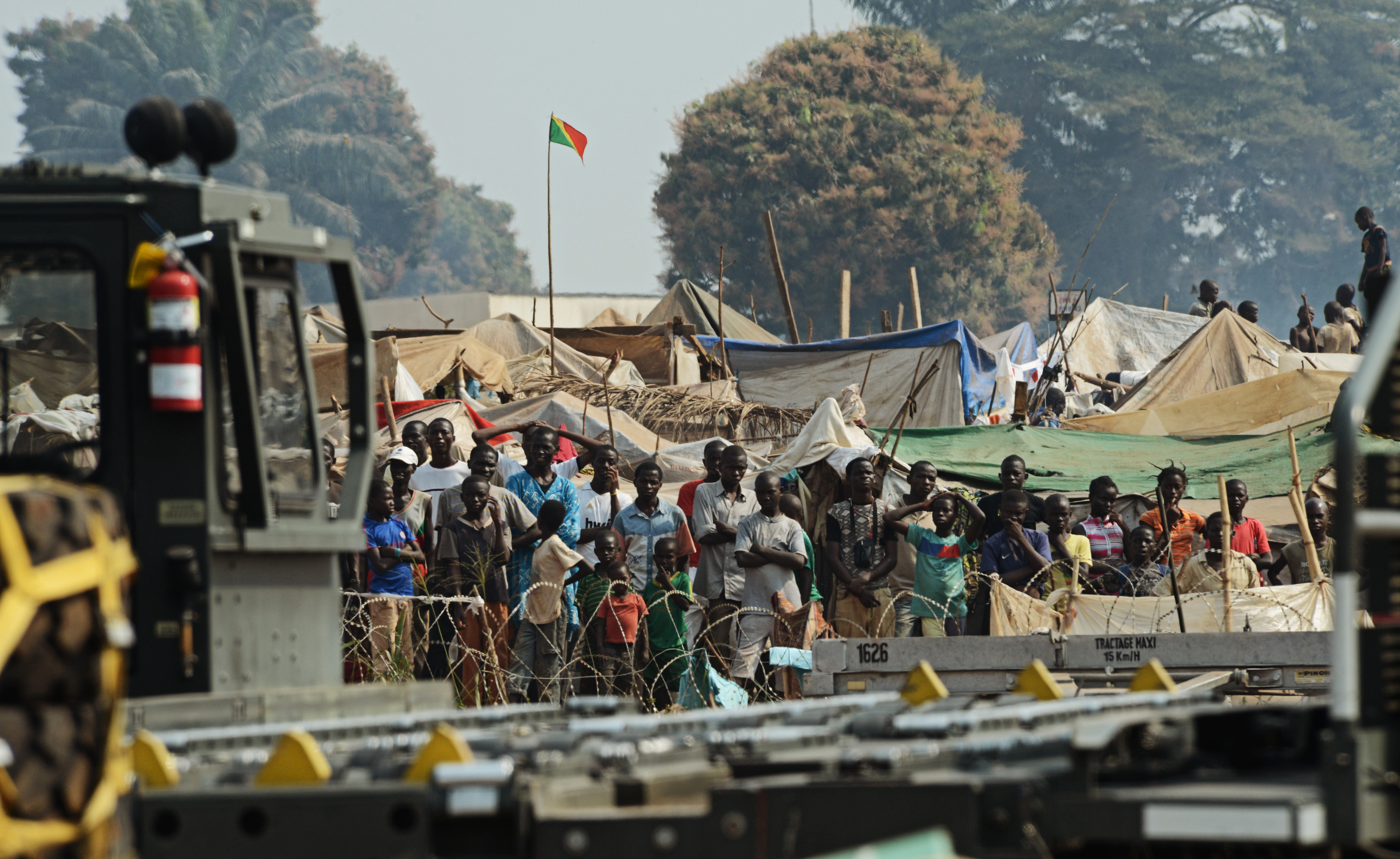
Refugees of the fighting in the Central African Republic, 19 January 2014

- Strategic demographic and cultural cleansing by the Sinhala Buddhist majority of the Muslim and Tamil minorities in Sri Lanka.
- The killing of hundreds of ethnic Uzbeks in Kyrgyzstan during the 2010 South Kyrgyzstan ethnic clashes resulting in the flight of thousands of Uzbek refugees to Uzbekistan has been called ethnic cleansing by the Organization for Security and Co-operation in Europe and international media.
- Members of the Azusa 13 gang, associated with the Mexican Mafia, were accused of attempting a racial cleansing of African Americans in Azusa, California.
- Since 2012, an alliance of mostly-Christian militias in the Central African Republic known as Anti-balaka have committed massacres and forcible conversions towards Muslims in what has been described as ethnic cleansing.
- During the Syrian civil war, the government of Bashar al-Assad launched ethnic cleansing campaigns throughout Syria to re-shape Syrian demographics, and the military operations of Syrian Arab Armed Forces have been compared to the tactics of Serbian militant groups during the Bosnian war. Between 2011 and 2015, Ba'athist militias perpetrated at least 49 ethno-sectarian massacres for the purpose of implementing the Assad government's social engineering agenda in the country. Alawite loyalist militias, known as the Shabiha, were deployed by the Assad regime into Sunni villages and towns, where they perpetrated numerous anti-Sunni massacres. Assadist militias and Iran-backed Shia militant groups launched large-scale pogroms and deportations in central Syrian regions and Alawite majority coastal areas. In 2016, the United Nations denounced Bashar al-Assad for perpetrating an ethnic cleansing campaign in Darayya district in Damascus. The violent campaigns of Assad regime against the Syrian population resulted in the Syrian refugee crisis; causing the forced displacement of 14 million Syrians, with around 7.2 million refugees. This has made the Syrian refugee crisis the largest refugee crisis in the world; and UNHCR High Commissioner Filippo Grandi has described it as "the biggest humanitarian and refugee crisis of our time and a continuing cause for suffering."
- An estimated 90,000 people were displaced in the sectarian violence between Rohingya Muslims and Buddhists in Burma's western Rakhine State in 2012.
- Approximately 400,000 people were displaced in the ethnic violence between indigenous Bodos and Bengali-speaking Muslims in Assam, India, in 2012.
- Sources inside the Syriac Orthodox Church reported in 2012 that an ethnic cleansing of Syrian Christians was carried out by anti-government rebels.
- As part of a campaign of ethnic cleansing against Rohingya Muslims, more than 50 people were killed in the 2013 Myanmar anti-Muslim riots.
- In 2014 ISIS began to attack Iraq's minorities, causing the Yazidi genocide and Iraqi Turkmen genocide.
- In 2015, Turkish Prime Minister Ahmet Davutoglu publicly accused Russia and Syria of ethnic cleansing against the Syrian Turkmen minority. Only a few thousand Turkmen now live in Syria, in contrast to the 200,000–300,000 Turks who lived there before the Syrian Civil War. Thousands of Turkmen villagers have fled the country to escape Russian bombing. The minority also faced persecution prior to the war; and were forced to stop speaking their dialect.
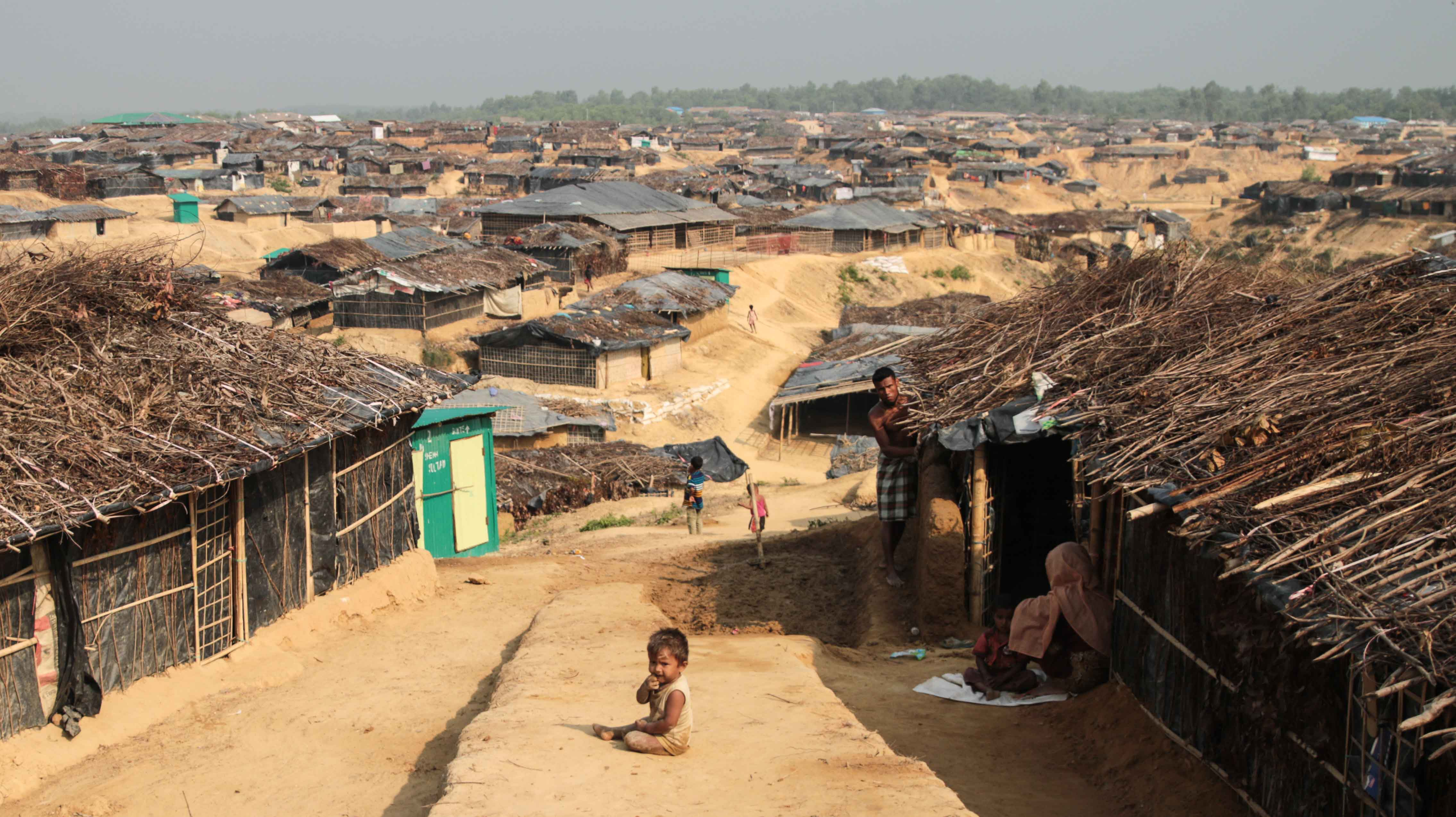
  Rohingya refugees from Myanmar, March 2017
- In 2017 a new wave of government sanctioned ethnic cleansing against Rohingya Muslims amounting to genocide with thousands killed and many villages burned to the ground with their inhabitants executed has been reported in Myanmar, to the extent that children have reported to be beheaded or burned alive by the Myanmar military and Buddhist vigilantes.
- The ongoing Turkish occupation of northern Syria has seen ethnic cleansing of Kurds, Christians, Yazidis, and other minorities, especially in the Afrin District, where 150,000–300,000 Kurds were displaced. The Turkish state has been resettling Afrin with Arab Syrian refugees.
- Some commentators have argued that the persecution of Uyghurs in China has involved a campaign of ethnic cleansing orchestrated by the Chinese government against the Uyghur people and other ethnic and religious minorities in and around the Xinjiang Uyghur Autonomous Region (XUAR) of the People's Republic of China. Since 2014, the Chinese government, led by the Chinese Communist Party (CCP) during the administration of CCP general secretary Xi Jinping, has pursued policies leading to more than one million Muslims (the majority of them Uyghurs) being held in re-education camps without any legal process in what has become the largest-scale and most systematic detention of ethnic and religious minorities since the Holocaust.

=== 2020s ===
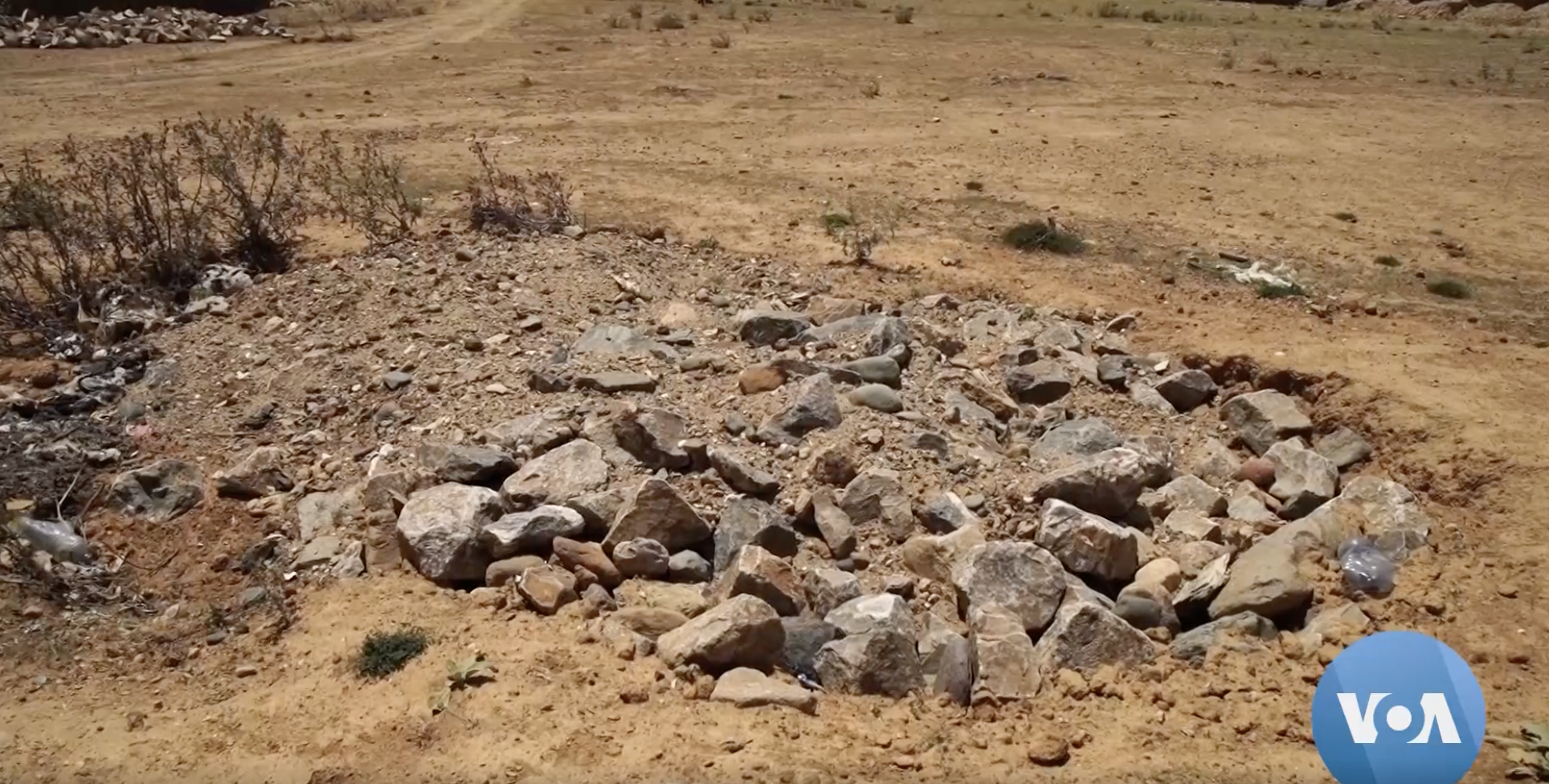
Mass grave of civilians in Tigray, 2021

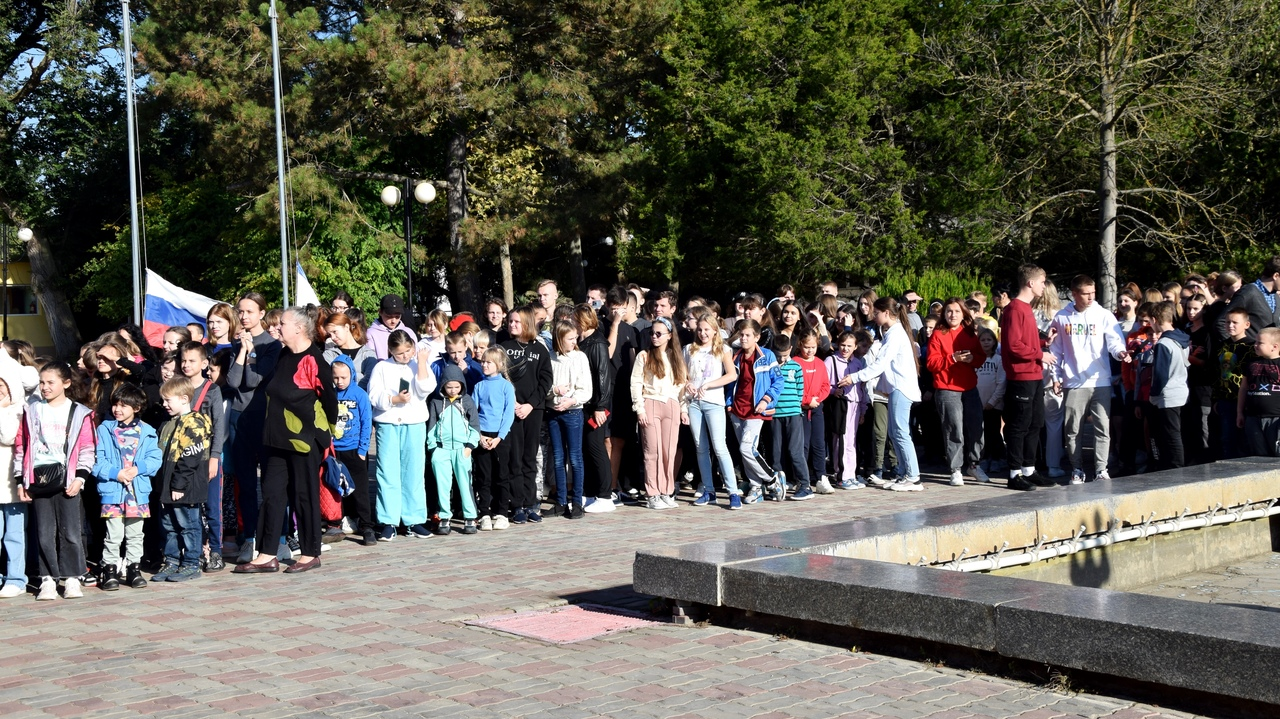
1,500 Ukrainian children from Kherson and Zaporizhzhia at Yevpatoria, Russian-occupied Crimea, October 2022

- The War in Tigray has been described as an ongoing ethnic cleansing perpetrated by Ethiopia against ethnic Tigrayans. New IDs have been prescribed to Tigrayans, and many Tigrayans living in other Ethiopian regions have been subject to "ethnically selective purges". Ethiopia has also weaponized famine as a key war tactic in Tigray, leaving an estimated 90% of the population vulnerable to famine. All electricity has been cut off by Ethiopia, disrupting Tigray's communication with the outside world. One schoolteacher recalled, "Even if someone was dead, they shot them again, dozens of times. I saw this. I saw many bodies, even priests. They killed all Tigrayans."
- During the Russian invasion of Ukraine, reports indicated that between 900,000 and 1.6 million Ukrainians on the Russian-occupied territories were deported to Russia, including 260,000 children. At least 18 filtration camps were established along the Russian border to facilitate this transfer. These crimes were alleged to be a form of depopulation and ethnic cleansing of Ukraine by the Russian military on the order of Russia's leader Vladimir Putin. In 2023, the International Criminal Court (ICC) issued an arrest warrant for Vladimir Putin and Maria Lvova-Belova for unlawful deportation and forcible transfer of population (children) from occupied areas of Ukraine to Russia.
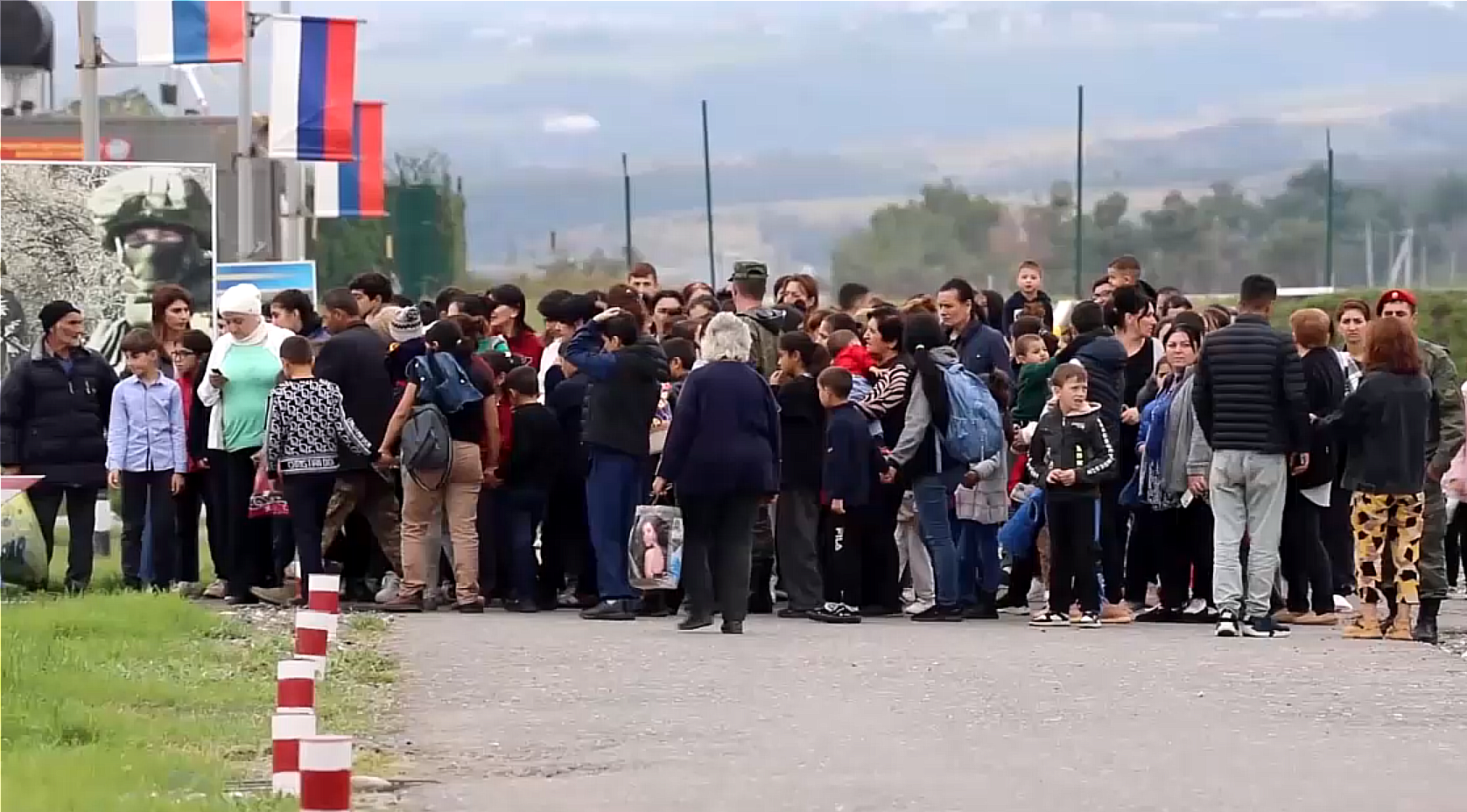
  Flight of Nagorno-Karabakh Armenians in September 2023
- In 2022 Azerbaijan launched a nine-month blockade of Nagorno-Karabakh, destroyed public utilities and abducted several civilians. In September 2023, Azerbaijan then launched a military offensive and regained control over Nagorno-Karabakh, which had been internationally recognized as part of its territory. Fears of persecution led indigenous Armenian inhabitants of the region to flee to Armenia from 24 September onward. By 3 October, 100,617 refugees, more than 99% of Nagorno-Karabakh's population, had fled to Armenia. Azerbaijan's blockade and its military offensive have been described as ethnic cleansing and genocide.
- During the Sudanese civil war, many civilians were killed in Darfur in the Masalit massacres, which have been described as ethnic cleansing or genocide. RSF militias have been accused of committing ethnic cleansing against the Fur, Masalit, and Zaghawa peoples.
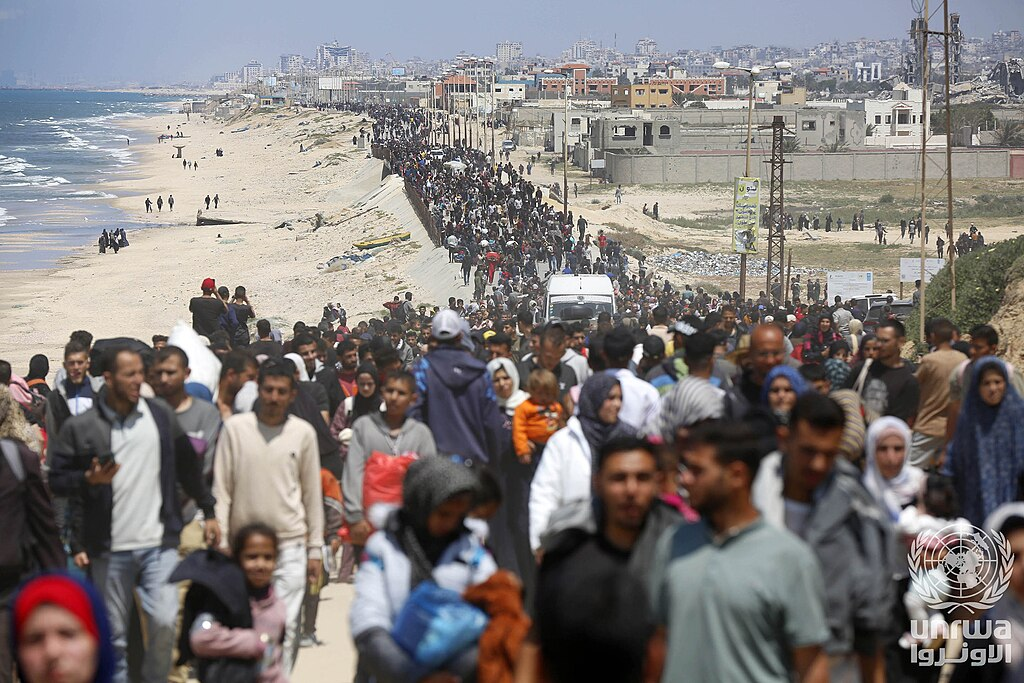
  Displaced Palestinians in the Gaza Strip, April 2024
- At the beginning of the Gaza war, on 13 October 2023, the Israel Defense Forces (IDF) ordered the evacuation of 1.1 million people from north Gaza. The same day, journalist Eric Levitz of The Intelligencer stated that U.S. governmental administrations, including the Biden administration, have approved Israeli war crimes against Palestinians, and that no military solution can achieve Israel's security goals short of ethnic cleansing and genocide. On October 14 UN Special rapporteur Francesca Albanese warned of a mass ethnic cleansing in Gaza. In January 2024, genocide scholar Mark Levene detailed how Israel's actions are ethnic cleansing at the very least, in line with Israeli intelligence ministry's policy paper for a forcible and permanent transfer of all Gazans, supported by Netanyahu's government. Donald Trump's Gaza Strip proposal has been described as an “insane” bid to mask the large-scale ethnic cleansing of Palestinians.
- In addition to the genocide in Gaza, Israel has also been accused of ethnic cleansing on the West Bank through the usage of military actors and state-backed settlers to attack and displace Palestinians.
- Since the Hezbollah-Israel war began in 2024, Israel has been accused of a variety of atrocities that have been described as ethnic cleansing or genocide. Amnesty International described Israeli military action as "deliberate destruction", with Genocide Watch citing this "domicide" as evidence of extermination. Israel has also been accused of encouraging Christian and Druze community leaders to push out Shiite refugees. On March 27, 2026, US Congresswoman Rashida Tlaib submitted a resolution calling for solidarity with the Lebanese people and accusing Israel of ethnic cleansing and genocide.
- Upon the start of his second term in January 2025, Trump initiated a mass deportation campaign of suspected illegal immigrants in the United States. By May, historian Michael W. Charney questioned if the campaign could be considered ethnic cleansing of non-white immigrants in the country. Charney concluded: "Trump's America is not just a cultural war, but a demographic one as well." In June, the administration promised to create an office of "remigration", referring to a far-right euphemism for ethnic cleansing originating in Europe. Since then, opinion columns published in The Philadelphia Inquirer, Chicago Tribune, and The Guardian have described the operation as ethnic cleansing. The establishment of the Office of Remigration has been criticized as promoting ethnic cleansing by Wendy Via, president of the Global Project Against Hate and Extremism.

== See also ==
- Crimes against humanity
- Expulsions and exoduses of Jews
- Genocide of indigenous peoples
- Genocides in history
- List of diasporas
- List of ethnic riots
- List of expulsions of African Americans
- List of genocides
- List of war crimes
- Population transfer in the Soviet Union
