= 1914 Greek deportations =

Forcible expulsion of Ottoman Greeks

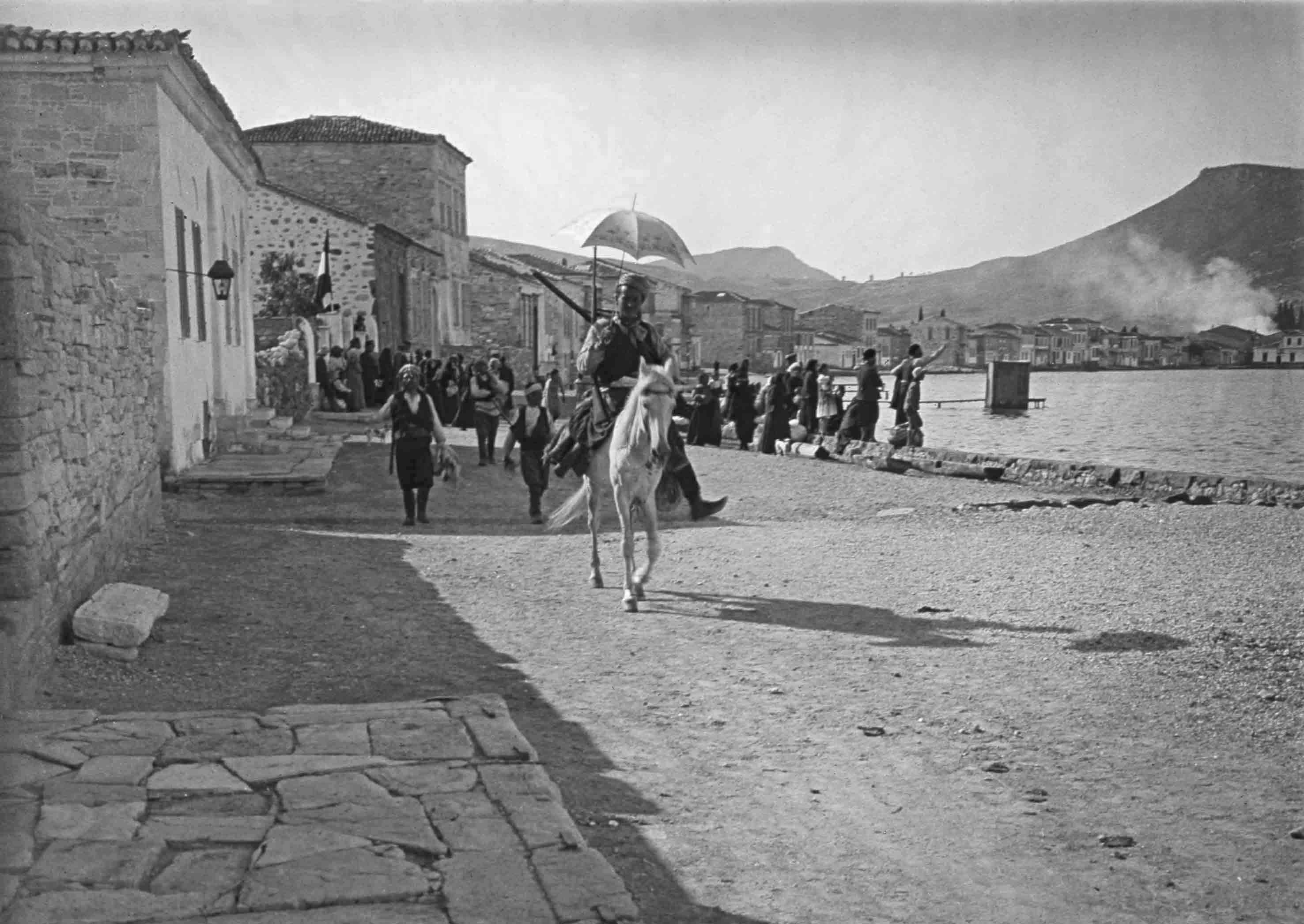
Çetes (Turkish/Muslim bandits) parading with loot in Phocaea (modern-day Foça, Turkey) on 13 June 1914. In the background are Greek refugees and burning buildings.

The 1914 Greek deportations was the forcible expulsion of around 150,000 to 300,000 Ottoman Greeks from Eastern Thrace and the Aegean coast of Anatolia by the Committee of Union and Progress that culminated in May and June 1914. The deportations almost caused war between Greece and the Ottoman Empire and were an important precursor to the Armenian genocide.

== Background ==
In the aftermath of the 1909 Greek annexation of Crete, the Ottoman boycott movement began to form, initially targeting citizens of Greece but also affecting Ottoman Greeks with Greek citizenship as well as eventually all Ottoman Greeks. Violence and looting were soon reported. The aim of the boycott was to make it impossible for Greeks to live in Anatolia, as well as to displace Christians from the economy to create a national economy dominated by Muslim Turks. This new economic class was perceived to be more loyal to the state, not just because of its ethnoreligious characteristics but because it owed its place to the removal of the competition by the state. Many Ottoman Greeks were economically ruined by the boycott but they were reluctant to leave. Some left temporarily and returned when the boycott died down. In the aftermath of the Balkan Wars the boycott continued to intensify and was directly organized by the ruling party, Committee of Union and Progress (CUP). Historian Matthias Bjørnlund sees the Greek deportation as "an extension of the policy of economic and cultural boycott".

The 1912 First Balkan War resulted in the loss of almost all of the empire's European territory and the mass expulsion of Muslims from the Balkans; around 350,000 to 400,000 Muslims fled to the Ottoman Empire between 1912 and the Ottoman entry into World War I. Ottoman Muslim society was incensed by the atrocities committed against Balkan Muslims, intensifying anti-Christian sentiment and leading to a desire for revenge. Contemporary historian Arnold Toynbee, in The Western Question in Greece and Turkey (1922), emphasizes the similarities of the expulsion of Ottoman Greeks to that of Balkan Muslims, stating: "the Balkan War[s] had two harvests of victims: first, the Rumili Turks on the one side, and... the Anatolian Greeks on the other". During the First Balkan War Greece also seized the Greek-populated islands of Chios, Lesvos, and Limnos near the Anatolian coast. The European powers allowed Greece to keep the islands despite Ottoman protests that they threatened the mainland, as they were located adjacent to areas where many Ottoman Greeks lived.

In January 1913, the CUP launched another coup, installed a one-party state, and strictly repressed all real or perceived internal enemies. After the 1913 coup, the CUP escalated anti-Greek and anti-Armenian violence and pursued a policy of changing the demographic balance of border areas by resettling Muslim immigrants while coercing Christians to leave; immigrants were promised property that had belonged to Christians. As a consequence of the war, Muslim/Turkish nationalism became the strongest ideological current in the remaining Ottoman Empire. The deportations of Greeks were "informed by [this] radically exclusionist political ideology". Another concern was the concentration of a population whose loyalty was doubted by the CUP in a strategically important location.

== Eastern Thrace ==
When parts of Eastern Thrace were reoccupied by the Ottoman Empire during the Second Balkan War in mid-1913, local Greeks as well as Armenians were subjected to looting and intimidation especially in Malkara and Rodosto. Beginning in March 1914, Special Organization units began to systematically attack Greek villages, conscripting the men into labor battalions and forcing other residents to leave; Greek-owned businesses were confiscated and given to Muslims. The aim was to persuade or, failing that, force Greeks to leave, by preventing them from accessing their farmland, levying disproportionately high taxation, confiscation, forcible conscription, and murders. The Ottoman government specifically controlled which enterprises should fire Christian workers and paid the passage of all emigrants to Greece. Some Greeks still live in East Thrace in Turkey, descended from the people and families who converted to Islam in order to stay and avoid being deported to Greece.

== Western Anatolia ==
Danish consul Alfred van der Zee believed that due to the relatively low population density in the area, it would have been possible to resettle Muslim refugees without expelling the Greek population. Special Organization leader Eşref Sencer Kuşçubaşı said that the population movement was organized by the state, and that in February 1914 Enver Pasha had insisted on doing away with the non-Muslim population due to its perceived disloyalty—such an action was deemed necessary to preserve the empire. Russian consul Andrew D. Kalmykow wrote that Talat Bey (later Talat Pasha) told him "the Greeks cannot remain. They are forced to leave. They must go." Halil Menteşe stated that "Talât Bey suggested that the country be cleansed of those elements that were seen as capable of betraying the state".

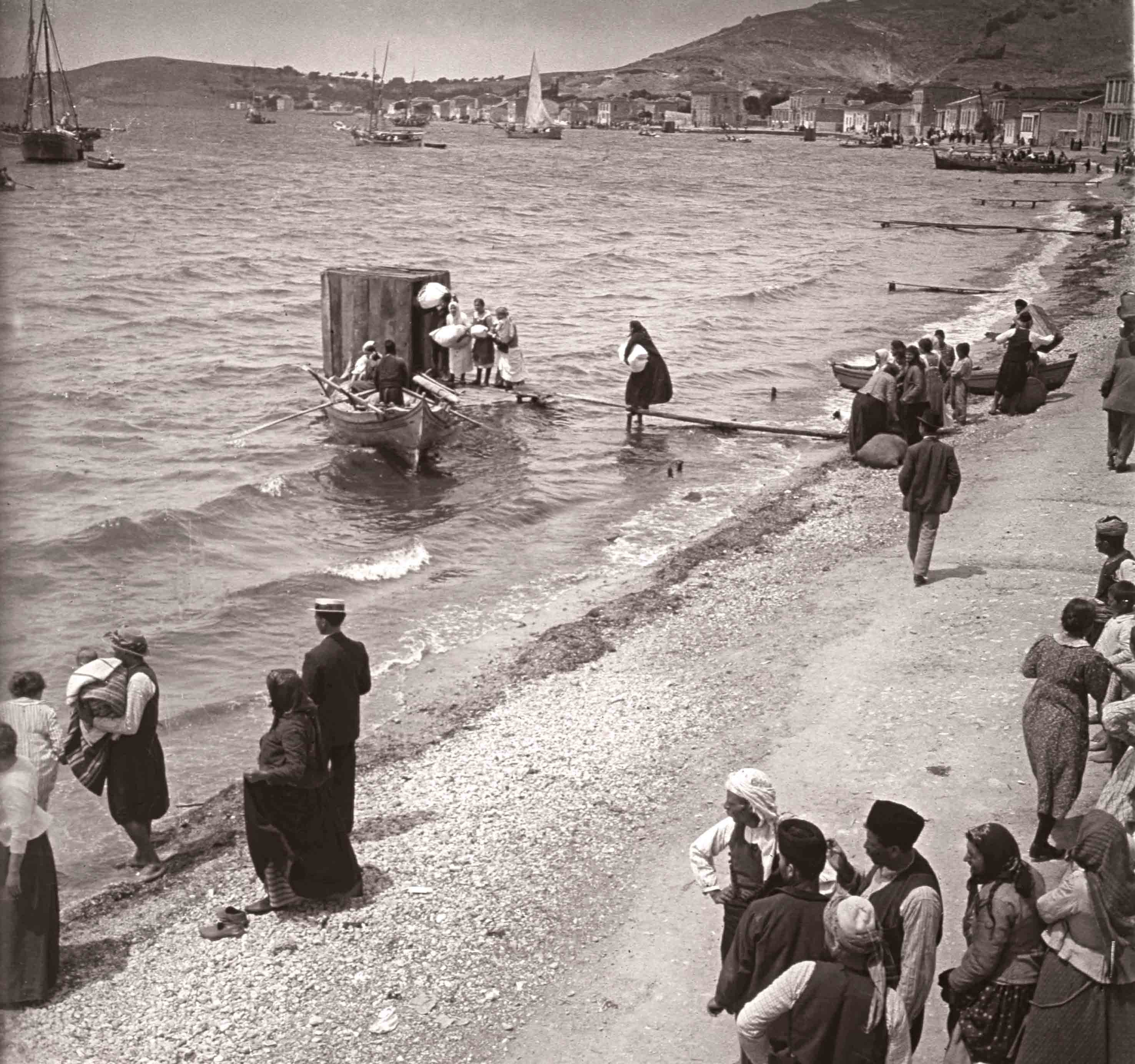
Ottoman Greek women forced to leave Phocaea, 13 June 1914

Attacks on Greeks began in March and April 1913, as attested by many complaints sent by the Ecumenical Patriarchate to the Ottoman authorities of looting, seizure of property, arbitrary arrest, and expulsion. The government closely observed the process, collecting information on the villages to be cleared and planning the resettlement of Muslims there. However, it maintained plausible deniability by employing a dual-track system—sending incriminating orders through unofficial channels—and denying responsibility for the ensuing attacks. The government ordered that empty villages be guarded to prevent looting so that the property of the Greeks could be allocated to the intended recipients, Muslim immigrants to be resettled there.

One of the most severe attacks in Western Anatolia was the massacre of Phocaea beginning 12 June; several thousand Greeks were forced to flee after the systematic destruction and plundering of their town by bashi-bazouk irregulars. Prior to this attack many Greeks from around Çakmaklı, Aliağa had fled to Phocaea while others emigrated to Partheni. Those from inland areas such as Kozbeyli, Gerenköy, and Söğütcük came under threat and also fled to Phocaea. This concentration of refugees, exceeding the capacity of the harbor, led to the village being surrounded and higher intensity violence occurring than elsewhere in Western Anatolia. The American Consulate in Salonica estimated that some five hundred to six hundred people had been killed in the broader area around Smyrna.

In some cases the violent anti-Greek campaigns were directly coordinated with the landing of Muslim refugees, who were tasked with driving out the Greek population and taking over their properties. Tens of thousands of Greeks escaped to the nearby Aegean islands, often in the same boats that had brought Muslim refugees. For the most part the Greeks did not engage in armed resistance, but in Saraköy some Greeks defended themselves until they ran out of ammunition and were killed; only a few were able to escape to nearby Menemen, too large of a town for the irregulars to attack. The later Turkish president Celal Bayar coordinated the expulsion. The local economy and standard of living declined significantly, as most of the immigrants were peasants who lacked the skills to cultivate local crops and much property was looted or destroyed by them.

== International politics ==
On 29 September 1913, 14 October 1913, and 14 November 1913, the Ottoman Empire concluded agreements on voluntary population exchange with Bulgaria, Serbia, and Greece respectively. Based on negotiations in May between Eleftherios Venizelos and Galip Kemali Bey, an agreement was signed on 1 July 1914 "On the mutual, voluntary exchange of Turks in Macedonia for Greeks in the provinces of Eastern Thrace and Macedonia". This agreement was never ratified. The Ottoman government moved ahead with its expulsions of Christian citizens without waiting for international agreements or negotiations to proceed.

The Ottoman authorities tried to maintain secrecy around the operation, and the responsibility of the CUP for organizing the campaign, in order to stave off international outrage. Akçam states that "Maximum effort was expended to create the impression that none of these actions by agents of the CUP were ever connected to the state." Emigrants had to sign papers asserting that they left voluntarily and willing their property to Ottoman institutions. Foreign consuls, contrary to Ottoman denials, reported that the campaign of terror and expulsion was systematic and coordinated by the Ottoman government, noting that in some cases official gendarmes conducted the attacks. The Ottoman Embassy in Paris reported that information about the anti-Greek campaign was harming the empire in European public opinion, and suggested that the attacks be stopped at once if the reports were true.

The Ottoman authorities tried to leverage the threat of ethnic cleansing to pressure Greece to renounce its claims to the islands that it seized during the Second Balkan War. Many observers believed at the time that persecution would lead to war between Greece and the Ottoman Empire. Venizelos stated that Greece would remain neutral in the upcoming World War I if Ottoman Greeks were not deported and the Ottoman Empire did not attack Greek islands in the Aegean. The CUP agreed to this and ceased their ethnic cleansing campaign. On 2 November 1914, Talat announced the official end of the policy, as he had come to an understanding with Germany, which did not want Greece to join the Entente. This cable stated that no further attacks on Greeks would be tolerated. A committee of inquiry into the events would be established and headed by Talat Bey, which members from several foreign embassies. After Greece joined the Entente during the war, the deportations resumed, these being organized by general Liman von Sanders.

== Total number of people deported ==
The total number of Greeks expelled from the Ottoman Empire is not known with certainty. Historian Taner Akçam estimates it at "roughly three hundred thousand", while Bjørnlund writes that "some 150–200,000 Ottoman Greeks" left either forcibly or after being threatened with violence. Vasileios Meichanetsidis estimates that at least 115,000 people were deported from Eastern Thrace to Greece, 85,000 from Eastern Thrace to central Anatolia, and another 150,000 from western Anatolia to Greece.

== Connection to the Armenian genocide ==
In his memoirs, United States ambassador Henry Morgenthau, Sr. states that "the Turks had expelled the Greeks so successfully that they had decided to apply the same method to all the other races in the empire". On 6 July 1914, Ottoman Greek deputy Emmanouil Emmanouilidis raised the matter of the deportation in the Ottoman Parliament. Talat explained that the Muslim migrants were resettled in the depopulated villages because they would have died if sent to the deserts of Syria and Iraq—exactly where he sent Armenian deportees a year later. Historian Hans-Lukas Kieser writes that the success achieved by "the CUP men of action... exceeded all expectations" and they "could savor a crushing victory achieved in a secret war along domestic ethnoreligious lines". Bjørnlund states that the perceived "success" of the Greek deportation "meant that even more radical measures could be seen as not only possible, but as yet another extension of a policy of social engineering through Turkification". Historian Tessa Hofmann argues that "the deportations in Eastern Thrace appear as the prototype of all subsequent deportations of Christians".

Many of the same CUP operatives, including Şükrü Kaya, Nâzım Bey, and Mehmed Reshid, were involved in both persecutions. Akçam describes the Greek deportation as "a trial run for the Armenian genocide". He notes that both operations were "ostensibly under the legal umbrella of Ottoman population policy", yet "an unofficial plan was implemented by a shadow organization that attacked and terrorized the Ottoman Christians". Bjørnlund states that "the official reactions to the 1914 events point toward aspects of" Armenian genocide denial as developed by the CUP and continuing into the present day: "the claim that the government, when it came to killings and persecution, had no control of local officials or of the designated killer gangs, and the attempts to apply damage control through cover-ups, shifting of blame, and propaganda". Talat blamed all excesses on the local government of Rahmi Bey, while the Ottoman government claimed that only 1,000 Greeks had left, against the will of the authorities, and the "incidents" were caused equally by Greeks and rogue Ottoman elements. Major deportations of Anatolian Greeks from the coast to the interior occurred during World War I from 1915 due to belief that they were a fifth column, although they were not subjected to systematic killing as were the Armenians.

== Sources ==
- Akçam, Taner (2012). The Young Turks' Crime against Humanity: The Armenian Genocide and Ethnic Cleansing in the Ottoman Empire. Princeton University Press. ISBN 978-0-691-15333-9.
- Bjørnlund, Matthias (2008). "The 1914 cleansing of Aegean Greeks as a case of violent Turkification". Journal of Genocide Research. 10 (1): 41–58. doi:10.1080/14623520701850286. S2CID 72975930.
- Çetinkaya, Y. Dogan (2014). The Young Turks and the Boycott Movement: Nationalism, Protest and the Working Classes in the Formation of Modern Turkey. Bloomsbury Publishing. ISBN 978-1-78672-516-5.
- Erol, Emre (2016). The Ottoman Crisis in Western Anatolia: Turkey's Belle Epoque and the Transition to a Modern Nation State. Bloomsbury Publishing. ISBN 978-0-85772-820-3.
- Göçek, Fatma Müge (2015). Denial of Violence: Ottoman Past, Turkish Present and Collective Violence Against the Armenians, 1789–2009. Oxford University Press. ISBN 978-0-19-933420-9.
- Kaligian, Dikran (2017). "Convulsions at the End of Empire: Thrace, Asia Minor, and the Aegean". In Shirinian, George N. (ed.). Genocide in the Ottoman Empire: Armenians, Assyrians, and Greeks, 1913-1923. Berghahn Books. pp. 82–104. ISBN 978-1-78533-433-7.
- Kieser, Hans-Lukas (2018). Talaat Pasha: Father of Modern Turkey, Architect of Genocide. Princeton University Press. ISBN 978-1-4008-8963-1.
  - Lay summary in: Kieser, Hans-Lukas. "Pasha, Talat". 1914-1918-online. International Encyclopedia of the First World War.
- Meichanetsidis, Vasileios Th. (2015). "The Genocide of the Greeks of the Ottoman Empire, 1913–1923: A Comprehensive Overview". Genocide Studies International. 9 (1): 104–173. doi:10.3138/gsi.9.1.06. S2CID 154870709.
- Morris, Benny; Ze’evi, Dror (24 April 2019). The Thirty-Year Genocide: Turkey's Destruction of Its Christian Minorities, 1894–1924. Harvard University Press. ISBN 978-0-674-91645-6.
- Ozil, Ayşe (2020). "In the Towns of Western Anatolia at the Time of the Great War: Greek Responses to the Ottoman Boycott and the Forced Population Movement". Not All Quiet on the Ottoman Fronts: Neglected Perspectives on a Global War, 1914-1918. Ergon-Verlag. pp. 101–118. ISBN 978-3-95650-778-6.
- Pezo, Edvin (2017). "Violence, Forced Migration, and Population Policies". The Balkan Wars from Contemporary Perception to Historic Memory. Springer. ISBN 978-3-319-44642-4.
- Suny, Ronald Grigor (2015). "They Can Live in the Desert but Nowhere Else": A History of the Armenian genocide. Princeton University Press. ISBN 978-1-4008-6558-1.
  - Lay summary in: Suny, Ronald Grigor. "Armenian Genocide". 1914-1918-online. International Encyclopedia of the First World War.
