= Exclusionism =

Political doctrine

Exclusionism is the political ideology and practice of excluding people from the community, especially in the context of ethnic nationalism, racism, or xenophobia.

== See also ==
- Religious exclusivism
