= Matthias Bjørnlund =

Danish historian

Matthias Bjørnlund (born 1967) is a Danish historian. In 2003–05 he was the workshop leader of Department for Holocaust and Genocide Studies in Copenhagen in connection with the commemoration of the international Auschwitz Day.

He received his MA in history from the University of Copenhagen. His thesis was "A People is Being Murdered: The Armenian Genocide in Danish Sources". He is also working as a researcher and translator of Danish documents on the Armenian genocide with a partial funding by a grant from the Danish Ministry of Culture.

== Sources ==
- Interview with Mattias Bjørnlund
