= Deportation of the Karachays =

1943 Soviet ethnic cleansing and genocide

Deportation of the Karachays Operation Seagull
- Part of Population transfer in the Soviet Union, Russo-Caucasian conflict, and World War II
- Location: Karachay Autonomous Oblast, North Caucasus
- Date: 2 November 1943
- Target: Karachays
- Attack type: Genocide, Forced displacement, ethnic cleansing
- Deaths: ~653 during transit ~estimated 13,100—19,000 from 1944-1952; ~43,000 in total (of which 22,000 were children)
- Victim: 69,267 Karachays deported to forced settlements in the Soviet Union
- Perpetrators: NKVD, the Soviet secret police
- Motive: Russification, retribution for Axis collaboration, cheap labor for forced settlements in the Soviet Union

The Soviet government forcibly transferred the entire Karachay population from the North Caucasus to Central Asia, mostly to the Kazakh and Kyrgyzstan SSRs, in November 1943, during World War II. The expulsion, codenamed Operation Seagull, was ordered by NKVD chief Lavrentiy Beria, after it was approved by Soviet Premier Joseph Stalin. Nearly 70,000 Karachays of the Caucasus were deported from their native land. The crime was a part of a Soviet forced settlement program and population transfer that affected several million members of non-Russian Soviet ethnic minorities between the 1930s and the 1950s.

Officially, the deportation was carried out in response to the Karachays supposed collaboration with occupying German forces. Originally only restricted to family members of rebel bandits during World War II, the deportation was later extended to the entire Karachay ethnic group. The Soviet government refused to acknowledge the fact that 20,000 Karachays served in the Red Army, greatly outnumbering the 3,000 Karachays who were estimated to have collaborated with the Wehrmacht (the German army). The deportation contributed to at least 13,000—19,000 deaths, resulting in a 19% mortality rate for the deported population. The Karachays were the first North Caucasus ethnic group to be targeted by Stalin's policy of complete resettlement, which later encompassed five other ethnic groups.

They were rehabilitated in 1956, after Nikita Khrushchev became the new Soviet Premier and undertook a process of de-Stalinization. In 1957, the Karachays were released from special settlements and allowed to return to their home region, which was formalized as the Karachay-Cherkess Autonomous Oblast. By 1959, nearly 85% of Soviet Karachays resided in Karachay-Cherkessia. Later, in 1989, the Soviet government declared that the deportation was a crime. Some contemporary scholars such as Manus Midlarsky cite the Chechens, Ingush, Kalmyks and the Karachays as ethnic groups which were singled out by Stalin's alleged genocidal behavior.

== Background ==
The Karachays are a Caucasian-Turkic Muslim ethnic group who live in the Northern Caucasus. In 2002, Walter Comins-Richmond in the Journal of Genocide Research wrote of the Karachays "As a Turkic speaking-people surrounded by Caucasian and Iranic speakers their genesis has attracted much scholarly attention. But to date all that has been definitively established is that Karachays and Balkars are among the most ancient of Caucasian peoples. Quite probably, they are thought to be part of a once larger Turkic group which was conquered by the Mongol invasions in the 1200s and then by Timur the following century. As a result, their territory and numbers were greatly reduced, but they emerged as distinct ethnocultural units by 1400." Following the Russian conquest of the Caucasus, they came under the rule of the Russian Empire in 1828, but revolted against the Tsarist rule. During the Russian Civil War in 1917, the Karachays had a short period of independence, but this was reversed when it became a part of the Soviet Union. In the 1929–30 uprising, around 3,000 Karachays and Balkars were shot by the Soviet forces.

In the 1920s, Joseph Stalin emerged as the new general secretary of the Communist Party of the Soviet Union. Ben Kiernan, an American academic and historian, described Stalin's era as "by far the bloodiest of Soviet or even Russian history". In November 1921, the Congress of the people of the Karachays and Circassia voted to establish a joint autonomy. In 1922, the Karachay Autonomous Oblast was established. The 1939 Soviet census registered 75,737 Karachays.

During World War II, Nazi Germany invaded the Soviet Union in June 1941, annexing much of the western parts of the Soviet Union. Between 1941 and 1943, the people of Karachay-Cherkessia allocated 52 million roubles to the Soviet defence efforts. The Karachay soldiers serving the Red Army fought in the Battle of Moscow and helped defeat the "Edelweiss" division. Nevertheless, the Wehrmacht occupied the Karachay oblast in August 1942. The Gestapo tortured and killed numerous Karachays. The anti-Soviet band groups, led by Izmail Dudov and M. Botashev, attacked the Soviet forces, including the Red Army, but also terrorized the local population. The German authorities also allowed for the formation of the Karachay National Committee. 362 paratroopers, which included some 200 Karachays, were dispatched by the German soldiers in the region in order to destabilize it. The Soviet army recaptured the region in January 1943, thereby arresting 8,673 persons by April the same year. 65 bands were eliminated, their weapons confiscated. The Karachay National Committee fled with the German army. On 15 April 1943, the Soviet Office of the Prosecutor General issued Directive N 52-6927, ordering the deportation of the family members of the active band groups outside the Karachay region. 177 families, numbering 673 people, were subject to deportation.

== Deportation ==
During World War II, eight ethnic groups were expelled in their entirety from their native lands by the Soviet government: the Volga Germans, the Chechens, the Ingush, the Balkars, the Karachays, the Crimean Tatars, the Meskhetian Turks and the Kalmyks. Approximately 650,000 people were deported from the Caucasus region in 1943 and 1944 and a total of 3,332,589 people were deported during the entire war. The Karachays were the first people to be completely deported from the Northern Caucasus.

By October 1943, Stalin and Lavrentiy Beria, Head of the NKVD, the Soviet secret police, decided upon the complete deportation of the Karachays, codenamed Operation Seagull. Ivan Serov, the deputy commissar of the NKVD, and Amayak Kobulov, were assigned to carry out the plan. All the Karachay were supposed to be deported, even members of the Communist Party and the Komsomol. They were formally charged with Axis collaboration during World War II. The Soviet government refused to acknowledge that 20,000 Karachays served in the Red Army, greatly outnumbering the 3,000 estimated to have collaborated with the German soldiers. 35 Karachays were given the Hero of the Soviet Union award. On 14 October 1943, the Soviet government issued resolution no. 1118-342 ss, officially commencing the deportation. 20,000 NKVD officers and 7,000 operational workers were sent to the region to implement the operation. No major instances of resistance was reported. The Karachays were allowed to carry 100 kilograms (220 lb) of property with them on the trip, but no more than 500 kilograms (1,100 lb) per family. Prior to the deportation, the NKVD searched the homes of the locals and confiscated firearms, rifles, revolvers and other weapons. The Karachays were then loaded onto cattle cars. These railroad cars were dispatched to Central Asia, mostly to the Kazakh and Kyrgyz Soviet Socialist Republic. Starting from 2 November 1943, a total of 69,267 Karachays were deported in the operation.

Since most of young men were serving in the Red Army, the deported people consisted mostly out of children under the age of 16 (50%) and women (30%). During the transit, the trains would seldom stop and open the doors to distribute food, and during that occasion the deportees were not allowed to walk further than 3 metres (9.8 ft) away from the wagons. Many older people and children died during the long transit, caused by a lack of medical assistance and food shortages. A local NKVD report, dated April 1945, registered 40,046 Karachays in the Kazakh SSR, 22,112 in the Kyrgyz SSR and 353 in the Uzbek SSR. This is a total of 62,529 Karachays in 1945, down from 69,267 who were deported two years prior. Only 53 of the deportees were officially registered as bandits. In 1944, demobilized officers of the Red Army were also sent to the Kazakh SSR. In May 1944, 90 additional Karachays found in the Rostov Region, Azerbaijan Soviet Socialist Republic, Dagestan and other places in the region were also deported.

The Karachay Autonomous Oblast was abolished and carved up between the Krasnodar and Stavropol Krai, as well as Georgian Soviet Socialist Republic. After this operation, the Soviet media was forbidden mentioning the accomplishments of the deported peoples on the Eastern front.

== Possible reasons ==
Scholar Svante Cornell points out that the Caucasus deportations were a part of a larger Russian policy that had been in effect since 1864: to remove as many Muslim minorities from the Caucasus as possible. Scholars Alexandre Bennigsen and Marie Broxup somewhat agree, assuming that the resettlement was aimed at solving the "Muslim problem" of the rebellious people of the North Caucasus. The Soviet authorities tried to forge a state out of 108 different nationalities. Initially they tried to use this multiethnic state to exploit cross-border ethnic groups to project influence into the countries neighboring the Soviet Union. Terry Martin, a professor of Russian studies, assessed that this had the opposite effect; the Soviet fear of "capitalist influence" eventually led to ethnic cleansing of its borderlands. Martin gives four possible reasons for the deportations from the Caucasus: security, social disorder, Russification and revenge. He dismisses the security reason since the five North Caucasus ethnic groups were far from the Turkish border, but accepts that social disorder, caused by long anti-Soviet resistance of these groups, Russification and punishment for Axis collaboration of some were contributing factors for Soviet decision to start the deportations.

Kazakhstani Korean scholar German Kim points out that 1.7 million people perished in the Kazakh famine of 1931–33, while a further million fled the Republic, causing a shortage of people in that area, which Stalin sought to compensate by deporting other ethnicities there. American anthropologist Jeffrey Cole assumes that the Karachays were just one of several "weak minorities used as scapegoats" in order for the Stalinist system to conceal its own mistakes and failures in World War II.

== Exile and casualties ==
The Karachays, among with other peoples deported from the Caucasus, were placed under the administration of the special settlements and sent to labor camps. They were dispersed between 550 settlements in Central Asia. These settlements provided forced labor for underdeveloped and inhospitable regions of the Soviet Union. The Karachays were assigned to work in the agriculture, livestock and construction sector. The special settlers routinely worked twelve hours a day, seven days a week. They suffered from exhaustion, cold, and hunger, with food rations tied to work quotas. They were not paid for their work.

Due to the World War II evacuations, the Central Asian areas were already overloaded with refugees from European Russia, lacking housing. The accommodation of the deportees thus proved difficult: in one district, out of 1,445 deported families, only 175 were provided with housing by the end of 1944. Others had to live in houses of farmers, sheds, barns, brigade bases or in tents. The cold weather of Central Asia and lack of sanitation led to diseases, including dysentery and malaria. Their food rations were sometimes not delivered by the kolkhozes. Although initially reluctant to make contact with them, the Kyrgyz locals eventually showed hospitality and sympathy with the Karachays. Some were reported to have shared their food with the deportees.

In August 1944, the Soviet government provided aid to the Karachay deportees, in the form of 600 tonnes of grain, 150 tonnes of cereals, and 4,859,900 roubles.

The mortality caused by the resettlement and living conditions in exile is estimated at 13,100 to 19,000 fatalities. This represent a mortality rate of 19%. 653 people died during the transit, including from thirst and heat prostration caused by being locked up in the trains. The recorded population of the Karachays in special settlements reached a recorded low of 56,869 on 26 November 1948.

Estimate of the mortality rate of the Karachays:
19%	81%
Died in exile	Survived in exile

The Presidium of the Supreme Soviet issued a decree on 26 November 1948, titled "On Criminal Accountability for Escapes from Places of Compulsory and Permanent Settlement by Persons Exiled to Remote Regions of the Soviet Union during the Period of the Great Patriotic War". The decree formally stated that all deported ethnic groups must remain in permanent exile.

== Aftermath and legacy ==
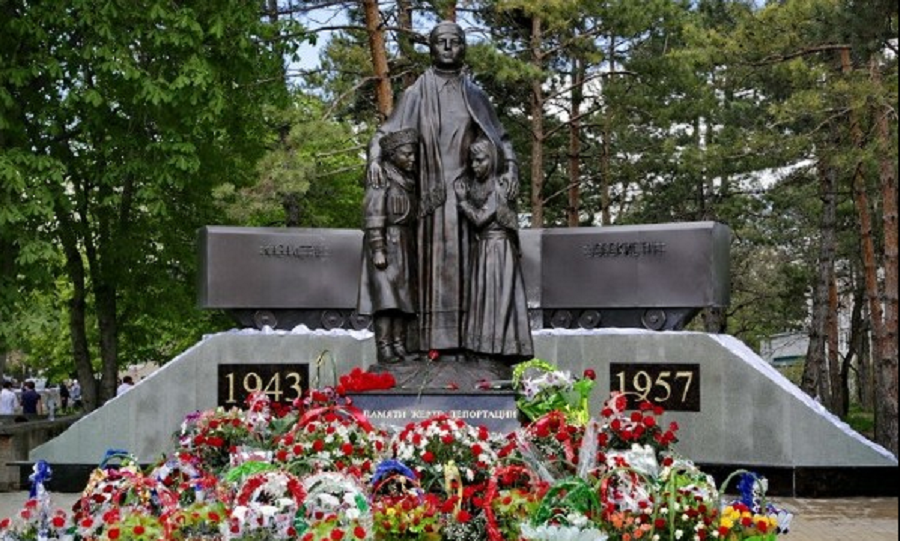
Memorial to the deported Karachays, Uchkeken

After Stalin's death in 1953, Nikita Khrushchev started a process of de-Stalinization, reversing many of previous policies. In his secret speech on 24 February 1956, Khrushchev condemned the ethnic deportations:

This deportation action was not dictated by any military considerations. Thus, already at the end of 1943, when there occurred a permanent breakthrough at the fronts... a decision was taken and executed concerning the deportation of all the Karachay from the lands on which they lived. In the same period, at the end of December 1943, the same lot befell whole population of the Autonomous Kalmyk Republic. In March all the Chechen and Ingush peoples were deported and the Chechen-Ingush Autonomous Republic was liquidated. In April 1944, all Balkars were deported to faraway places from the territory of the Kalbino-Balkar Autonomous Republic and the Republic itself was renamed the Autonomous Kabardin Republic.

In August 1953, the Central Committee of the Communist Party of the Soviet Union overturned the decree of the Presidium of the Supreme Soviet from 1948, which ordered that all the evicted ethnic groups must remain in permanent exile. On 16 July 1956, the Presidium of the Supreme Soviet officially released the Karachays, Chechens and the Ingush from special settlements. In 1957, the Karachays were allowed to return to their native land: by 1959, nearly 85% of Soviet Karachays resided in Karachay-Cherkessia. Their return was sometimes problematic: they found Russians living in their homes, forcing them to find other places to stay in the region.

On 14 November 1989 the Supreme Council of the Soviet Union declared all of Stalin's deportations "illegal and criminal". On 26 April 1991 the Supreme Soviet of the Russian Socialist Federal Soviet Republic, under its chairman Boris Yeltsin, followed suit and passed the law On the Rehabilitation of Repressed Peoples with Article 2 denouncing all mass deportations as "Stalin's policy of defamation and genocide". Russian historian Pavel Polian considered all the deportations of entire ethnic groups during Stalin's era, including those from the Caucasus, a crime against humanity.

By 1995, 23,024 Karachays were issued with certificates confirming their rehabilitation.

Professor Brian Glyn Williams concluded that the deportation of the Meskhetian Turks, in spite of their lands never coming close to the scene of combat during World War II and which coincided with the deportation of other ethnic groups from Caucasus and Crimea, lends the strongest evidence that all the deportations were a part of a larger concealed Soviet foreign policy rather than a response to any "universal mass treason". In its 1991 report, Human Rights Watch described all of the Soviet mass deportations as a form of collective punishment since groups were targeted on the basis of their ethnicity. It also noted that none of these ethnic groups were given any kind of compensation for the harm caused by the deportations.

Contemporary scholars and historians sometimes include the Karachays as one of the deported ethnic groups who were victims of an attempted Soviet genocide. Others disagree. Professor Alexander Statiev argues that Stalin's administration did not have a specific intent (dolus specialis) to exterminate the various deported peoples, but that Soviet "political culture, poor planning, haste, and wartime shortages were responsible for the genocidal death rate among them." He rather considers these deportations an example of Soviet assimilation and re-education of "stigmatized people".

== See also ==
- Deportation of the Chechens and Ingush
- Deportation of the Meskhetian Turks
- Deportation of the Crimean Tatars
- Deportation of the Kalmyks
- Deportation of the Balkars
- Deportation of the Koreans

== Bibliography ==
Books

- Bennigsen, Alexandre; Broxup, Marie (1983). The Islamic threat to the Soviet State. Taylor & Francis. ISBN 9781317831716. LCCN 82016826.
- Buckley, Cynthia J.; Ruble, Blair A.; Hofmann, Erin Trouth (2008). Migration, Homeland, and Belonging in Eurasia. Woodrow Wilson Center Press. ISBN 978-0801890758. LCCN 2008-015571.
- Bugay, Nikolay (1996). The Deportation of Peoples in the Soviet Union. New York City: Nova Publishers. ISBN 9781560723714.
- Cohen, Saul Bernard (2014). Geopolitics: The Geography of International Relations. Rowman & Littlefield. ISBN 9781442223516. LCCN 2014029230.
- Cole, Jeffrey, ed. (2011). Ethnic Groups of Europe. ABC-CLIO. ISBN 9781598843033. LCCN 2011000412.
- Cornell, Svante (2005). Small Nations and Great Powers: A Study of Ethnopolitical Conflict in the Caucasus. Routledge. ISBN 9781135796686. LCCN 2001347121.
- Gross, Feliks (1998). The Civic and the Tribal State: The State, Ethnicity, and the Multiethnic State. Greenwood Publishing Group. ISBN 9780313291456. LCCN 98012329.
- Ivanova, Galina Mikhailovna; Raleigh, Donald J.; Mikhailovna, Galina; Flath, Carol A. (2015). Labor Camp Socialism: The Gulag in the Soviet Totalitarian System. Routledge. ISBN 9781317466642.
- Kiernan, Ben (2007). Blood and Soil: A World History of Genocide and Extermination from Sparta to Darfur. Yale University Press. p. 511. ISBN 9780300100983. OCLC 2007001525.
- Litvin, Alter (2001). Writing History in Twentieth-century Russia: A View from Within. Springer. ISBN 9781403913890. LCCN 2001034806.
- Martin, Terry (2001). The Affirmative Action Empire: Nations and Nationalism in the Soviet Union, 1923–1939. Cornell University Press. ISBN 9780801486777. LCCN 2001003232.
- Martin, Terry (2001b). "Stalinist Forced Relocation Policies: Patterns, Causes, Consequences". In Weiner, Myron; Stanton Russell, Sharon (eds.). Demography and National Security. Berghahn Books. ISBN 9781571813398. OCLC 979121559.
- Mawdsley, Evan (1998). The Stalin Years: The Soviet Union, 1929-1953. Manchester University Press. ISBN 9780719046001. LCCN 2003046365.
- Nader, Kathleen; Dubrow, Nancy; Stamm, B. Hudnall (1999). Honoring Differences: Cultural Issues in the Treatment of Trauma and Loss. Psychology Press. ISBN 9780876309346. LCCN 99011369.
- Parrish, Michael (1996). The Lesser Terror: Soviet State Security, 1939-1953. Greenwood Publishing Group. ISBN 9780275951139. LCCN 94038565.
- Perovic, Jeronim (2018). From Conquest to Deportation: The North Caucasus under Russian Rule. Oxford University Press. ISBN 9780190934675. OCLC 1083957407.
- Pohl, J. Otto (1997). The Stalinist Penal System: A Statistical History of Soviet Repression and Terror, 1930-1953. McFarland. ISBN 9780786403363.
- Pohl, J. Otto (1999). Ethnic Cleansing in the Ussr, 1937-1949. Westport: Greenwood Publishing Group. ISBN 9780313309212. LCCN 98046822.
- Pokalova, Elena (2015). Chechnya's Terrorist Network: The Evolution of Terrorism in Russia's North Caucasus. ABC-CLIO. ISBN 9781440831553. LCCN 2014038634.
- Polian, Pavel (2004). Against Their Will: The History and Geography of Forced Migrations in the USSR. Budapest; New York City: Central European University Press. ISBN 9789639241688. LCCN 2003019544.
- Richmond, Walter (2008). The Northwest Caucasus: Past, Present, Future. Routledge. ISBN 9780415776158. LCCN 2008001048.
- Rywkin, Michael (1994). Moscow's Lost Empire. Routledge. ISBN 9781315287713. LCCN 93029308.
- Tolz, Vera (1993). "New Information about the Deportation of Ethnic Groups in the USSR during World War 2". In Garrard, John; Healicon, Alison (eds.). World War 2 and the Soviet People: Selected Papers from the Fourth World Congress for Soviet and East European Studies. New York City: Springer. ISBN 9781349227969. LCCN 92010827.
- Viola, Lynne (2007). The Unknown Gulag: The Lost World of Stalin's Special Settlements. Oxford: Oxford University Press. ISBN 9780195187694. OCLC 456302666.
- Weiner, Amir (2013). "The Empires Pays a Visit: Gulag Returnees, East European Rebellions, and Soviet Frontier Politics". In Kozlov, Denis; Gilburd, Eleonory (eds.). The Thaw: Soviet Society and Culture during the 1950s and 1960s. University of Toronto Press. ISBN 9781442618954. LCCN 2013431527.
- Williams, Brian Glyn (2001). The Crimean Tatars: The Diaspora Experience and the Forging of a Nation. BRILL. ISBN 9789004121225. LCCN 2001035369.

Reports

- Human Rights Watch (1991). "Punished Peoples" of the Soviet Union: The Continuing Legacy of Stalin's Deportations" (PDF). OCLC 25705762.
- Japarov, Amantur (2018). "Deported Karachays in Kyrgyzstan: The Experience of Integration" (PDF). Global Centre for Pluralism.

Journals

- Comins-Richmond, Walter (2002a). "The deportation of the Karachays". Journal of Genocide Research. 4 (3): 431–439. doi:10.1080/14623520220151998. S2CID 71183042.
- Comins-Richmond, Walter (2002b). "The Karachay Struggle after the Deportation". Journal of Genocide Research. 22 (1): 63–79. doi:10.1080/13602000220124836. S2CID 145326621.
- Grannes, Alf (1991). "The Soviet deportation in 1943 of the Karachays: a Turkic Muslim people of North Caucasus". Institute of Muslim Minority Affairs Journal. 12 (1): 55–68. doi:10.1080/02666959108716187.
- Kim, German (2009). "Ethnic Entrepreneurship of Koreans in the USSR and post Soviet central Asia" (PDF). Institute of Developing Economies, Japan External Trade Organization. S2CID 142290323.
- Midlarsky, Manus I. (2009). "Territoriality and the onset of mass violence: the political extremism of Joseph Stalin". Journal of Genocide Research. 11 (2–3): 265–283. doi:10.1080/14623520903118979. S2CID 144510544.
- Pohl, Otto J. (1997). "Uprooted from the Caucasus". Quadrant. 41 (7–8): 81–85. ISSN 0033-5002.
- Statiev, Alexandar (2010). "Soviet ethnic deportations: intent versus outcome". Journal of Genocide Research. 11 (2–3): 243–264. doi:10.1080/14623520903118961. S2CID 71905569.
- Statiev, Alexander (2005). "The Nature of Anti-Soviet Armed Resistance, 1942-44: The North Caucasus, the Kalmyk Autonomous Republic, and Crimea". Kritika: Explorations in Russian and Eurasian History. 6 (2): 285–318. doi:10.1353/kri.2005.0029. S2CID 161159084.
