= Deportation of the Crimean Tatars =

1944 Soviet ethnic cleansing and genocide

- Part of forced population transfer in the Soviet Union, De-Tatarization of Crimea, and World War II
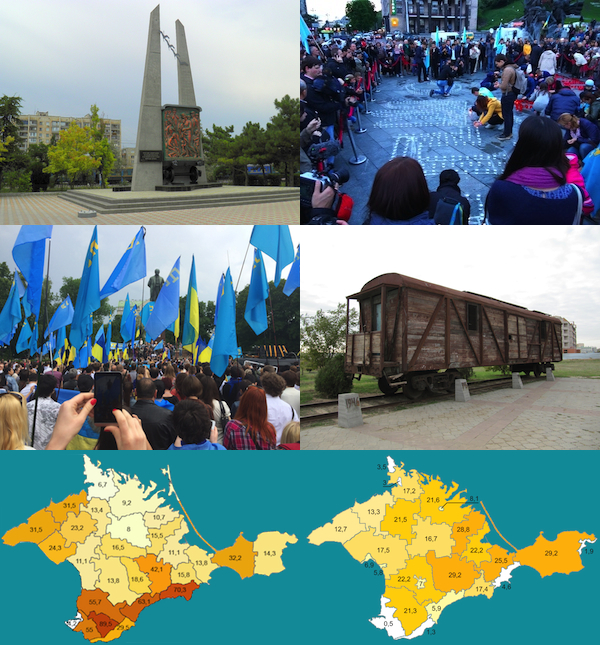
- Left to right, top to bottom: Memorial to the deportation in Yevpatoria; candle-lighting ceremony in Kyiv; memorial rally in Taras Shevchenko Park; cattlecar similar to the type used in the deportation; maps comparing the demographics of Crimea in 1939 and 2001
- Location: Crimea
- Date: 18–20 May 1944
- Target: Crimean Tatars
- Attack type: Forced population transfer, ethnic cleansing, genocide
- Deaths: Several estimates a) 34,000 b) 40,000–44,000 c) 42,000 d) 45,000 e) 109,956 f) 195,471
- Victim: 191,044 to 423,100 Crimean Tatars deported to forced settlements in the Soviet Union
- Perpetrators: NKVD, the Soviet secret police
- Motive: Tatarophobia, Islamophobia, Russification, colonialism

During the Sürgünlik ("exile"), at least 191,044 (Note: Or, according to other sources, 423,100.) Crimean Tatars were subjected to ethnic cleansing and cultural genocide (Note: The Russian SFSR officially recognised the deportations of peoples by Stalin's government from their territories as acts of genocide. Nevertheless, there are still some researchers who do not consider these deportations to be acts of genocide. For more information, see the section § Genocide question and recognition.) through deportation carried out by Soviet Union authorities from 18 to 20 May 1944. The deportation was supervised by Lavrentiy Beria, chief of Soviet state security and the secret police, and ordered by the Soviet leader Joseph Stalin. Within those three days, the NKVD used cattle trains to deport the Crimean Tatars, even Soviet Communist Party members and Red Army soldiers, from Crimea to the Uzbek SSR, several thousand kilometres away. They were one of several ethnicities that were subjected to Stalin's policy of population transfer in the Soviet Union.

Officially, the Soviet government presented the deportation as a policy of collective punishment, based on its claim that some Crimean Tatars collaborated with Nazi Germany in World War II, despite the fact that the 20,000 who collaborated with the Axis powers were half the 40,000 who served in the Soviet Red Army. However, several modern scholars believe that the government deported them as a part of its plan to gain access to the Dardanelles and acquire territory in Turkey, where the Turkic ethnic kin of the Tatars lived, or to remove minorities from the Soviet Union's border regions. By the end of the deportation, not a single Crimean Tatar lived in Crimea, and 80,000 houses and 360,000 acres of land were left abandoned. Nearly 8,000 Crimean Tatars died during the deportation, and tens of thousands subsequently perished due to the harsh living conditions in which they were forced to live during their exile. After the deportation, the Soviet government launched an intense detatarization campaign in an attempt to erase the remaining traces of Crimean Tatar existence.

In 1956, the new Soviet leader Nikita Khrushchev condemned Stalin's policies, including the deportation of various ethnic groups. He allowed most of these ethnic groups to return to their homelands, but he did not lift the directive that forbade the Crimean Tatars from returning. The Crimean Tatars remained in Central Asia for the next three decades, until the perestroika era of the late 1980s, when 260,000 of them returned to Crimea, after 45 years in exile. On 14 November 1989, the Supreme Council of the Soviet Union declared that the deportations had been a crime, and that the ban on their return to Crimea was officially null and void.

By 2004, the number of Crimean Tatars who had returned to Crimea had increased their share of the peninsula's population to 12%. The Soviet government had not assisted them during their return to Crimea, nor had it compensated them for the land they lost in the deportation. The deportation and the subsequent assimilation efforts in Asia are crucial events in the history of the Crimean Tatars. Between 2015 and 2025, the deportation was formally recognised as a genocide by Ukraine, Lithuania, Latvia, Canada, Poland, Estonia, the Czech Republic, and the Netherlands.

== Background ==
Crimea highlighted on a map of the Black Sea

The Crimean Tatars controlled the Crimean Khanate from 1441 to 1783, when Crimea was annexed by the Russian Empire as a target of Russian expansion. By the 14th century, most of the Turkic-speaking population of Crimea had adopted Islam, following the conversion of Ozbeg Khan of the Golden Horde. It was the longest surviving state of the Golden Horde. They often engaged in conflicts with Moscow—from 1468 until the 17th century, Crimean Tatars fought several wars with the Tsardom of Russia. Thus, after the establishment of the Russian rule, Crimean Tatars began leaving Crimea in several waves of emigration. Between 1784 and 1790, out of a total population of about a million, around 300,000 Crimean Tatars left for the Ottoman Empire.

The Crimean War triggered another mass exodus of Crimean Tatars. Between 1855 and 1866 at least 500,000 Muslims, and possibly up to 900,000, left the Russian Empire and emigrated to the Ottoman Empire. Out of that number, at least one third were from Crimea, while the rest were from the Caucasus. These emigrants comprised 15–23% of the total population of Crimea. The Russian Empire used that fact as the ideological foundation to further Russify "New Russia". Eventually, the Crimean Tatars became a minority in Crimea; in 1783, they comprised 98% of the population, but by 1897, this was down to 34.1%. While Crimean Tatars were emigrating, the Russian government encouraged Russification of the peninsula, populating it with Russians, Ukrainians, and other Slavic ethnic groups; this Russification continued during the Soviet era.

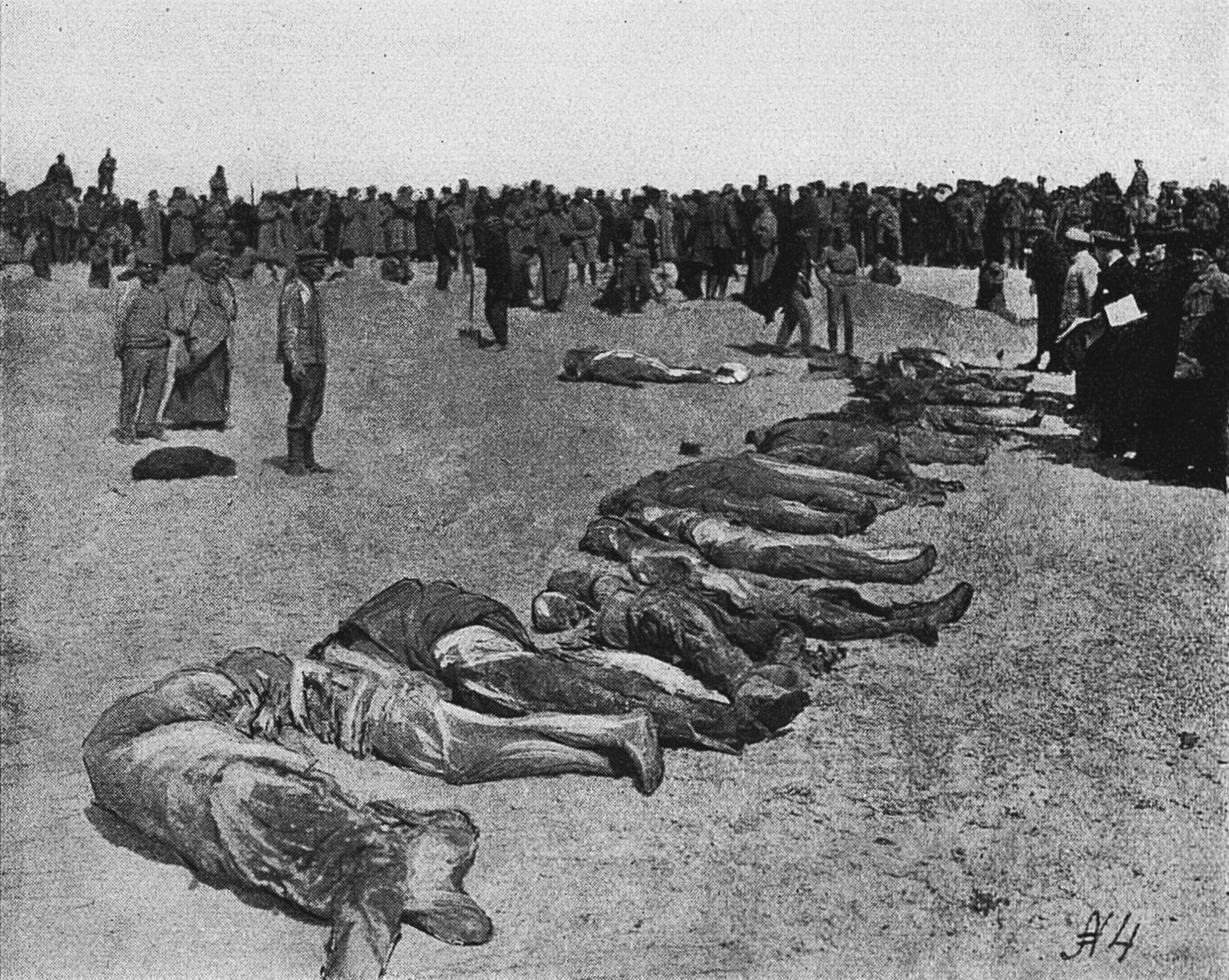
Corpses of victims of the winter 1918 Red Terror in Evpatoria, Crimea

After the 1917 October Revolution, Crimea received autonomous status inside the USSR on 18 October 1921, but collectivization in the 1920s led to severe famine from which up to 100,000 Crimeans perished when their crops were transported to "more important" regions of the Soviet Union. By one estimate, three-quarters of the famine victims were Crimean Tatars. Their status deteriorated further after Joseph Stalin became the de facto Soviet leader and implemented repressions that led to the deaths of at least 5.2 million Soviet citizens between 1927 and 1938.

=== World War II ===
In 1940, the Crimean Autonomous Soviet Socialist Republic had approximately 1,126,800 inhabitants, of which 218,000 people, or 19.4% of the population, were Crimean Tatars. In 1941, Nazi Germany invaded Eastern Europe, annexing much of the western USSR. Crimean Tatars initially viewed the Germans as liberators from Stalinism, and they had also been positively treated by the Germans in World War I.

Many of the captured Crimean Tatars serving in the Red Army were sent to POW camps after Romanians and Nazis came to occupy the bulk of Crimea. Though Nazis initially called for murder of all "Asiatic inferiors" and paraded around Crimean Tatar POW's labelled as "Mongol sub-humanity", they revised this policy in the face of determined resistance from the Red Army. Beginning in 1942, Germans recruited Soviet prisoners of war to form support armies. The Dobrujan Tatar nationalist Fazil Ulkusal and Lipka Tatar Edige Kirimal helped in freeing Crimean Tatars from German prisoner-of-war camps and enlisting them in the independent Crimean support legion for the Wehrmacht. This legion eventually included eight battalions, although many members were of other nationalities. From November 1941, German authorities allowed Crimean Tatars to establish Muslim Committees in various towns as a symbolic recognition of some local government authority, though they were not given any political power.

Number of Crimean Tatars in Crimea
Year	Number	Percentage
1783	500,000	98%
1897	186,212	34.1%
1939	218,879	19.4%
1959	—	—
1979	5,422	0.3%
1989	38,365	1.6%

Many Crimean Tatar communists strongly opposed the occupation and assisted the resistance movement to provide valuable strategic and political information. Other Crimean Tatars also fought on the side of the Soviet partisans, like the Tarhanov movement of 250 Crimean Tatars which fought throughout 1942 until its destruction. Six Crimean Tatars were even named the Heroes of the Soviet Union, and thousands more were awarded high honors in the Red Army.

Up to 130,000 people died during the Axis occupation of Crimea. The Nazis implemented a brutal repression, destroying more than 70 villages that were together home to about 25% of the Crimean Tatar population. Thousands of Crimean Tatars were forcibly transferred to work as Ostarbeiter in German factories under the supervision of the Gestapo in what were described as "vast slave workshops", resulting in loss of all Crimean Tatar support. In April 1944 the Red Army managed to repel the Axis forces from the peninsula in the Crimean Offensive.

A majority of the hiwis (helpers), their families and all those associated with the Muslim Committees were evacuated to Germany and Hungary or Dobruja by the Wehrmacht and Romanian Army where they joined the Eastern Turkic division. Thus, the majority of the collaborators had been evacuated from Crimea by the retreating Wehrmacht. Many Soviet officials had also recognized this and rejected claims that the Crimean Tatars had betrayed the Soviet Union en masse. The presence of Muslim Committees organized from Berlin by various Turkic foreigners appeared a cause for concern in the eyes of the Soviet government, already wary of Turkey at the time.

=== Falsification of information in propaganda ===
Soviet publications blatantly falsified information about Crimean Tatars in the Red Army, going so far as to describe Crimean Tatar Hero of the Soviet Union Uzeir Abduramanov as Azeri, not Crimean Tatar, on the cover of a 1944 issue of Ogonyok magazine – even though his family had been deported for being Crimean Tatar just a few months earlier. The book In the Mountains of Tavria falsely claimed that volunteer partisan scout Bekir Osmanov was a German spy and shot, although the central committee later acknowledged that he never served the Germans and survived the war, ordering later editions to have corrections after still-living Osmanov and his family noticed the obvious falsehood. Amet-khan Sultan, born to a Crimean Tatar mother and Lak father in Crimea, where he was born and raised, was often described as a Dagestani in post-deportation media, even though he always considered himself a Crimean Tatar.

The partisan movement in Crimea, spearheaded by A. V. Mokrousov, ultimately proved to be unsuccessful, primarily due to Mokrousov's inebriation and military ineptitude. In an attempt to rationalize their military shortcomings, the leadership of the partisan movement propagated allegations against the Crimean Tatars, claiming that they had largely defected to the German forces. This narrative served as a pretext for Soviet partisans to conduct raids on Crimean Tatar villages in search of provisions. During these incursions, partisans engaged in indiscriminate violence against civilians and appropriated food supplies, thereby exacerbating the plight of those who survived and leaving them vulnerable to starvation.

In response to these circumstances, the German authorities sanctioned the establishment of Crimean Tatar Schuma battalions, tasked with defending their communities against such raids. It is noteworthy that the Crimean Tatars exhibited a form of military collaboration; they either actively resisted the Red Army or defended their villages from partisan attacks. This stands in contrast to the actions of the Russians in Crimea, who were implicated in the repression of civilians and participated in the Holocaust. The Russian historian I. A. Makhalova, an expert on collaborationism during World War II, has commented on these dynamics:

Since the Crimean Tatars were more likely to collaborate militarily, while the Russians and Ukrainians were primarily involved in administrative functions and police service, the latter were more actively involved in the process of persecution and extermination of the Jewish population. This may explain, among other things, the harsher punishments they received after the liberation of Crimea.... The Crimean Tatar battalions did not participate in the persecution and physical extermination of the Jewish population of Crimea. This conclusion is supported by the testimony of former members of Einsatzgruppe D, who emphasized the role of the Crimean Tatar battalions in the fight against the partisans, while denying their involvement in the process of solving the "Jewish question". Taking into account the national composition of the police, it can be concluded that the Russians and Ukrainians were more actively involved in the Holocaust than the Crimean Tatar volunteers who were engaged in the fight against the partisans. — Irina Makhalova

In addition, Crimean Tatar victims of Nazi atrocities are widely ignored and even erased from the historical memory. For example, at the site of the December 1941 Nazi massacre in Simferopol, where both Jews, Krymchaks (Crimean Jews), and Romani Crimean Tatars were exterminated by the Nazis, the monument to the victims of the massacre mentions only Jews and Krymchaks but completely omits any mention of the Romani Crimean Tatars who were killed in the exact same spot. Years after the Nazi massacre of Crimean Tatars in the village of Burlak-Toma who were accused of being "tatar-gypsies", the government refused to acknowledge that the victims were Crimean Tatars, despite strong protests from witnesses and surviving family members of the victims, who consistently gave sworn testimony that they were indeed Crimean Tatars.

Nikolai Bugay and his disciples, including A. M. Gonov, A. S. Khunagov, and others, have endeavoured to provide a justification for the deportation of various ethnic groups within the USSR. In light of the inability to rely on discredited accusations that were repudiated by the KGB during the Perestroika period in the 1980s, these scholars resort to employing omissions, ambiguous insinuations, and conclusions that lack logical coherence with their initial premises. Furthermore, there are instances of document falsification that undermine the credibility of their arguments.

== Deportation ==
We were told that we were being evicted and we had 15 minutes to get ready to leave. We boarded boxcars – there were 60 people in each, but no one knew where we were being taken to. To be shot? Hanged? Tears and panic were taking over.

— Saiid, who was deported with his family from Yevpatoria when he was 10

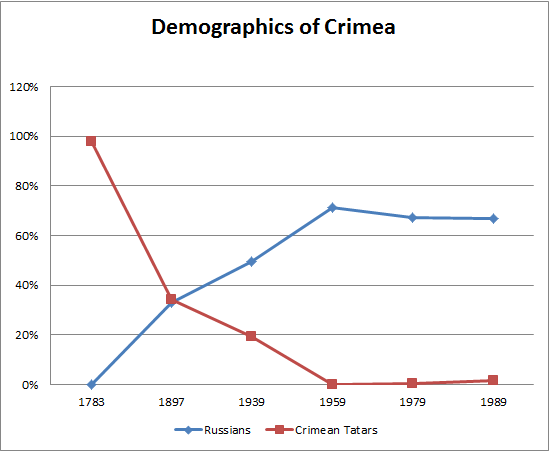
Chronology of the ethnic makeup of Crimea. The sharp drop of the Crimean Tatars is visible after the deportation. Crimean Tatars

Officially due to the collaboration with the Axis powers during World War II, the Soviet government collectively punished ten ethnic minorities, (Note: Besides the Crimean Tatars, these included the Volga Germans, Chechens, Ingush, Meskhetian Turks, Balkars, Karachays, Soviet Koreans, Kalmyks and Kurds.) among them the Crimean Tatars. Punishment included deportation to distant regions of Central Asia and Siberia. Soviet accounts of the late 1940s indict the Crimean Tatars collectively as an ethnicity of traitors. Although the Crimean Tatars denied that they had committed universal treason, this idea persisted during the Soviet period and Russian scholarly and popular literature.

According to various estimates, around 20,000 Crimean Tatars volunteered to fight for Nazi Germany, as opposed to 40,000 who fought for the Red Army. On 10 May 1944, Lavrentiy Beria recommended to Stalin that the Crimean Tatars should be deported away from the border regions due to their "traitorous actions". Stalin subsequently issued GKO Order No. 5859ss, which envisaged the resettlement of the Crimean Tatars. The deportation lasted only three days, 18–20 May 1944, during which NKVD agents went house to house collecting Crimean Tatars at gunpoint and forcing them to enter sealed-off cattle trains that would transfer them almost 3,200 kilometres (2,000 mi) to remote locations in the Uzbek Soviet Socialist Republic. The Crimean Tatars were allowed to carry up to 500 kg (1,100 lb) of their property per family. The only ones who could avoid this fate were Crimean Tatar women who were married to men of non-punished ethnic groups. The exiled Crimean Tatars travelled in overcrowded wagons for several weeks and lacked food and water. It is estimated that at least 228,392 people were deported from Crimea, of which at least 191,044 were Crimean Tatars in 47,000 families. Since 7,889 people perished in the long transit in sealed-off railcars, the NKVD registered the 183,155 living Crimean Tatars who arrived at their destinations in Central Asia. The majority of the deportees were rounded up from the Crimean countryside. Only 18,983 of the exiles were from Crimean cities.

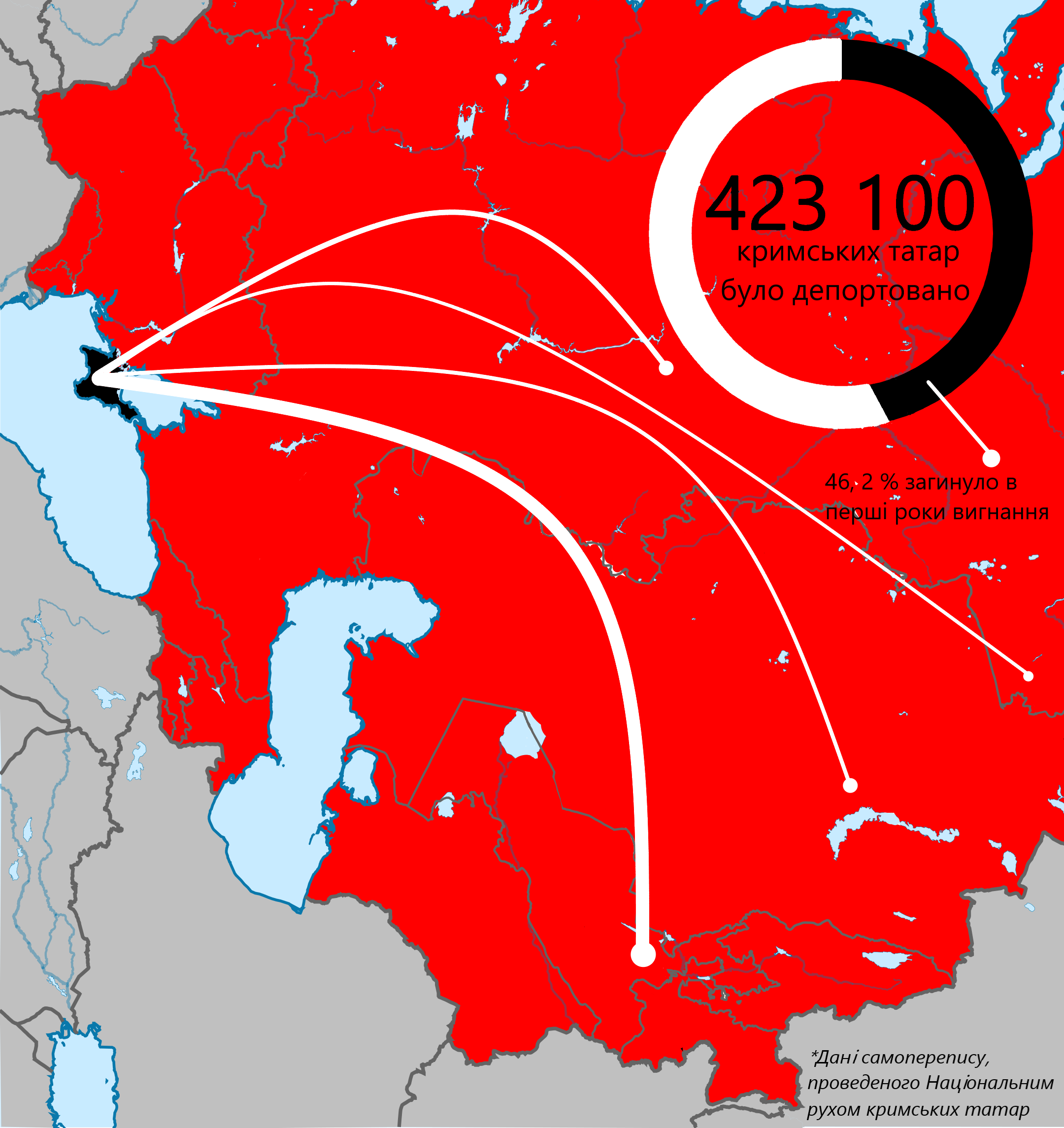
Destinations of the deported (in Ukrainian)

On 4 July 1944, the NKVD officially informed Stalin that the resettlement was complete. However, not long after that report, the NKVD found out that one of its units had forgotten to deport people from the Arabat Spit. Instead of preparing an additional transfer in trains, on 20 July the NKVD boarded hundreds of Crimean Tatars onto an old boat, took it to the middle of the Azov Sea, and sank the ship. Those who did not drown were finished off by machine guns.

Officially, Crimean Tatars were eliminated from Crimea. The deportation encompassed every person considered by the government to be Crimean Tatar, including children, women, and the elderly, and even those who had been members of the Communist Party or the Red Army. As such, they were legally designated as special settlers, which meant that they were officially second-class citizens, prohibited from leaving the perimeter of their assigned area, attending prestigious universities, and had to regularly appear before the commandant's office.

During this mass eviction, the Soviet authorities confiscated around 80,000 houses, 500,000 cattle, 360,000 acres of land, and 40,000 tons of agricultural provisions. Besides 191,000 deported Crimean Tatars, the Soviet authorities also evicted 9,620 Armenians, 12,420 Bulgarians, and 15,040 Greeks from the peninsula. All were collectively branded as traitors and became second-class citizens for decades in the USSR. 1,119 Germans and 3,652 foreign citizens were also expelled. Among the deported, there were also 283 persons of other ethnicities: Italians, Romanians, Karaims, Kurds, Czechs, Hungarians, and Croats. During 1947 and 1948, a further 2,012 veteran returnees were deported from Crimea by the local MVD.

Uzbekistan, the main destination of the deported

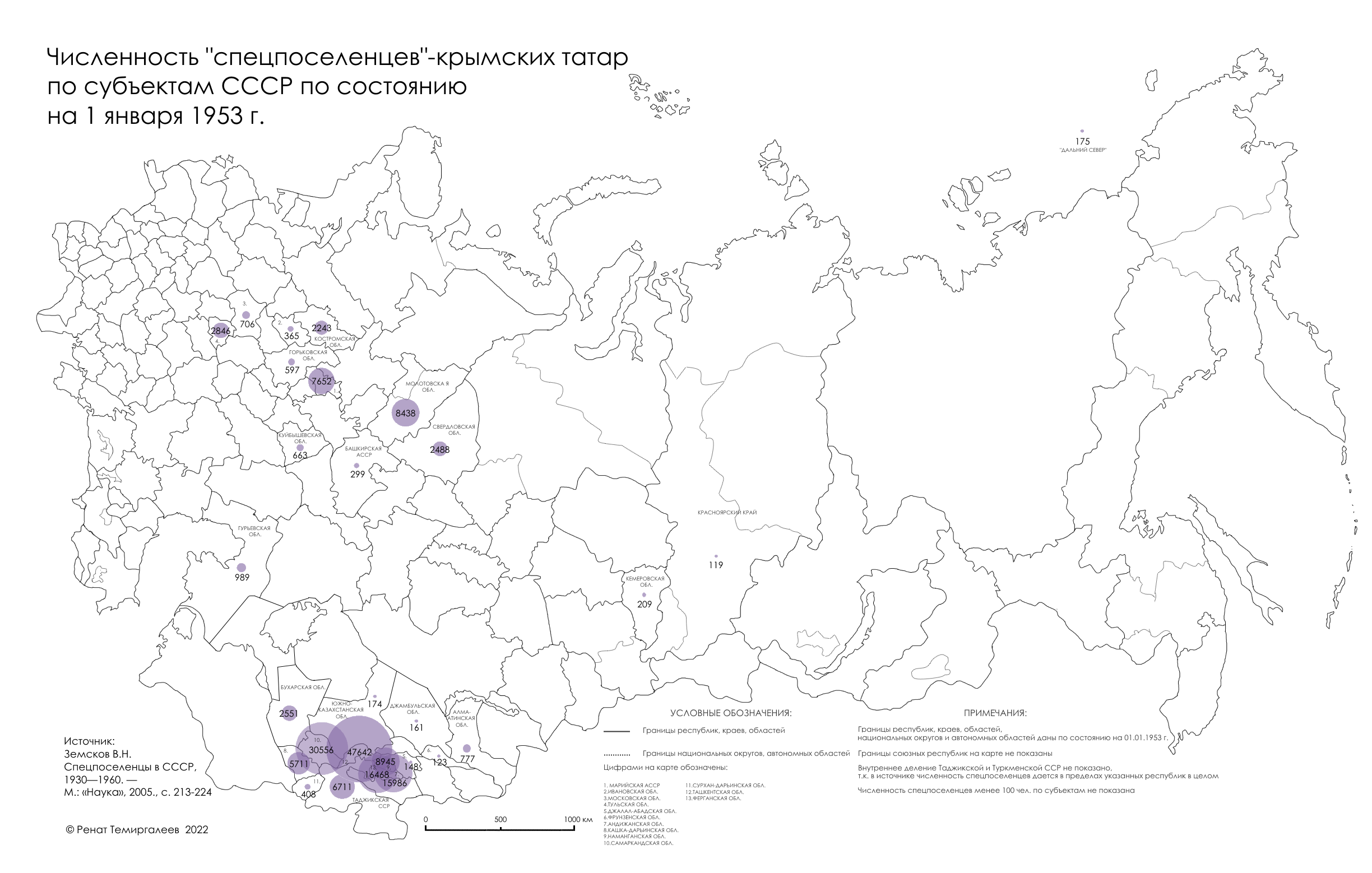
Distribution of resettled Crimean Tatars within Soviet subdivisions, 1 January 1953.

In total, 151,136 Crimean Tatars were deported to the Uzbek SSR; 8,597 to the Mari Autonomous Soviet Socialist Republic; and 4,286 to the Kazakh Soviet Socialist Republic; and the remaining 29,846 were sent to various remote regions of the Russian SFSR. When the Crimean Tatars arrived at their destination in the Uzbek SSR, they were met with hostility by Uzbek locals who threw stones at them, even their children, because they heard that the Crimean Tatars were "traitors" and "fascist collaborators". The Uzbeks objected to becoming the "dumping ground for treasonous nations". In the coming years, several assaults against the Crimean Tatars population were registered, some of which were fatal.

The mass Crimean deportations were organized by Lavrentiy Beria, the chief of the Soviet secret police, the NKVD, and his subordinates Bogdan Kobulov, Ivan Serov, B. P. Obruchnikov, M.G. Svinelupov, and A. N. Apolonov. The field operations were conducted by G. P. Dobrynin, the Deputy Head of the Gulag system; G. A. Bezhanov, the Colonel of State Security; I. I. Piiashev, Major General; S. A. Klepov, Commissar of State Security; I. S. Sheredega, Lt. General; B. I. Tekayev, Lt. Colonel of State Security; and two local leaders, P. M. Fokin, head of the Crimea NKGB, and V. T. Sergjenko, Lt. General. In order to execute this deportation, the NKVD secured 5,000 armed agents and the NKGB allocated a further 20,000 armed men, together with a few thousand regular soldiers. Two of Stalin's directives from May 1944 reveal that many parts of the Soviet government, from financing to transit, were involved in executing the operation.

On 14 July 1944, the GKO authorized the migration of 51,000 people, mostly Russians, to 17,000 empty collective farms on Crimea. On 30 June 1945, the Crimean ASSR was abolished.

Soviet propaganda sought to hide the population transfer by claiming that the Crimean Tatars had "voluntarily resettle[d] to Central Asia". In essence, though, according to historian Paul Robert Magocsi, Crimea was "ethnically cleansed". After this act, the term Crimean Tatar was banished from the Russian-Soviet lexicon, and all Crimean Tatar toponyms (names of towns, villages, and mountains) in Crimea were changed to Russian names on all maps as part of a wide detatarization campaign. Muslim graveyards and religious objects in Crimea were demolished or converted into secular places. During Stalin's rule, nobody was allowed to mention that this ethnicity even existed in the USSR. This went so far that many individuals were even forbidden to declare themselves as Crimean Tatars during the Soviet censuses of 1959, 1970, and 1979. They could only declare themselves as Tatars. This ban was lifted during the Soviet census of 1989.

== Aftermath ==
=== Mortality and death toll ===
Mortality of deported Crimean Tatars according to NKVDs files
Year	Number of deceased
May 1944 – 1 January 1945	13,592
1 January 1945 – 1 January 1946	13,183

The first deportees started arriving in the Uzbek SSR on 29 May 1944 and most had arrived by 8 June 1944. The consequent mortality rate remains disputed; the NKVD kept incomplete records of the death rate among the resettled ethnicities living in exile. Like the other deported peoples, the Crimean Tatars were placed under the regime of special settlements. Many of those deported performed forced labour: their tasks included working in coal mines and construction battalions, under the supervision of the NKVD. Deserters were executed. Special settlers routinely worked eleven to twelve hours a day, seven days a week. Despite this difficult physical labour, the Crimean Tatars were given only around 200 grams (7.1 oz) to 400 grams (14 oz) of bread per day. Accommodations were insufficient; some were forced to live in mud huts where "there were no doors or windows, nothing, just reeds" on the floor to sleep on.

The sole transport to these remote areas and labour colonies was equally as strenuous. Theoretically, the NKVD loaded 50 people into each railroad car, together with their property. One witness claimed that 133 people were in her wagon. They had only one hole in the floor of the wagon which was used as a toilet. Some pregnant women were forced to give birth inside these sealed-off railroad cars. The conditions in the overcrowded train wagons were exacerbated by a lack of hygiene, leading to cases of typhus. Since the trains only stopped to open the doors at rare occasions during the trip, the sick inevitably contaminated others in the wagons. It was only when they arrived at their destination in the Uzbek SSR that the Crimean Tatars were released from the sealed-off railroad cars. Still, some were redirected to other destinations in Central Asia and had to continue their journey. Some witnesses claimed that they travelled for 24 consecutive days. During this whole time, they were given very little food or water while trapped inside. There was no fresh air since the doors and windows were bolted shut. In Kazakh SSR, the transport guards unlocked the door only to toss out the corpses along the railroad. The Crimean Tatars thus called these railcars "crematoria on wheels". The records show that at least 7,889 Crimean Tatars died during this long journey, amounting to about 4 % of their entire ethnicity.

We were forced to repair our own individual tents. We worked and we starved. Many were so weak from hunger that they could not stay on their feet.... Our men were at the front and there was no one who could bury the dead. Sometimes the bodies lay among us for several days.... Some Crimean Tatar children dug little graves and buried the unfortunate little ones.
— anonymous Crimean Tatar woman, describing life in exile

The high mortality rate continued for several years in exile due to malnutrition, labour exploitation, diseases, lack of medical care, and exposure to the harsh desert climate of Uzbekistan. The exiles were frequently assigned to the heaviest construction sites. The Uzbek medical facilities filled with Crimean Tatars who were susceptible to the local Asian diseases not found on the Crimean peninsula where the water was purer, including yellow fever, dystrophy, malaria, and intestinal illness. The death toll was the highest during the first five years. In 1949 the Soviet authorities counted the population of the deported ethnic groups who lived in special settlements. According to their records, there were 44,887 excess deaths in these five years, 19.6% of that total group. Other sources give a figure of 44,125 deaths during that time, while a third source, using alternative NKVD archives, gives a figure of 32,107 deaths. These reports included all the people resettled from Crimea (including Armenians, Bulgarians, and Greeks), but the Crimean Tatars formed a majority in this group. It took five years until the number of births among the deported people started to surpass the number of deaths. Soviet archives reveal that between May 1944 and January 1945 a total of 13,592 Crimean Tatars perished in exile, about 7% of their entire population. Almost half of all deaths (6,096) were of children under the age of 16; another 4,525 were adult women and 2,562 were adult men. During 1945, a further 13,183 people died. Thus, by the end of December 1945, at least 27,000 Crimean Tatars had already died in exile. One Crimean Tatar woman living near Tashkent recalled the events from 1944:

My parents were moved from Crimea to Uzbekistan in May 1944. My parents had sisters and brothers, but when they arrived in Uzbekistan, the only survivors were themselves. My parents' sisters and brothers and parents all died in transit because of catching bad colds and other diseases.... My mother was left completely alone and her first work was to cut trees.

Estimates produced by Crimean Tatars indicate mortality figures that were far higher and amounted to 46% of their population living in exile. In 1968, when Leonid Brezhnev presided over the USSR, Crimean Tatar activists were persecuted for using that high mortality figure under the guise that it was a "slander to the USSR". In order to show that Crimean Tatars were exaggerating, the KGB published figures showing that "only" 22% of that ethnic group died. The Karachay demographer Dalchat Ediev estimates that 34,300 Crimean Tatars died due to the deportation, representing an 18% mortality rate. Hannibal Travis estimates that overall 40,000–80,000 Crimean Tatars died in exile. Professor Michael Rywkin gives a figure of at least 42,000 Crimean Tatars who died between 1944 and 1951, including 7,900 who died during the transit Professor Brian Glyn Williams gives a figure of between 40,000 and 44,000 deaths as a consequence of this deportation. The Crimean State Committee estimated that 45,000 Crimean Tatars died between 1944 and 1948. The official NKVD report estimated that 27% of that ethnicity died.

Various estimates of the mortality rates of the Crimean Tatars:

18%	82%
Died in exile	Survived in exile

27%	73%
Died in exile	Survived in exile

46%	54%
Died in exile	Survived in exile

=== Rehabilitation ===
A Crimean Tatar family in the 1960s during deportation after Soviet authorities refused to permit them to live in Crimea. Even after the "special-settlers" regime was lifted, Crimean Tatars were not allowed to live in Crimea without a residence permit

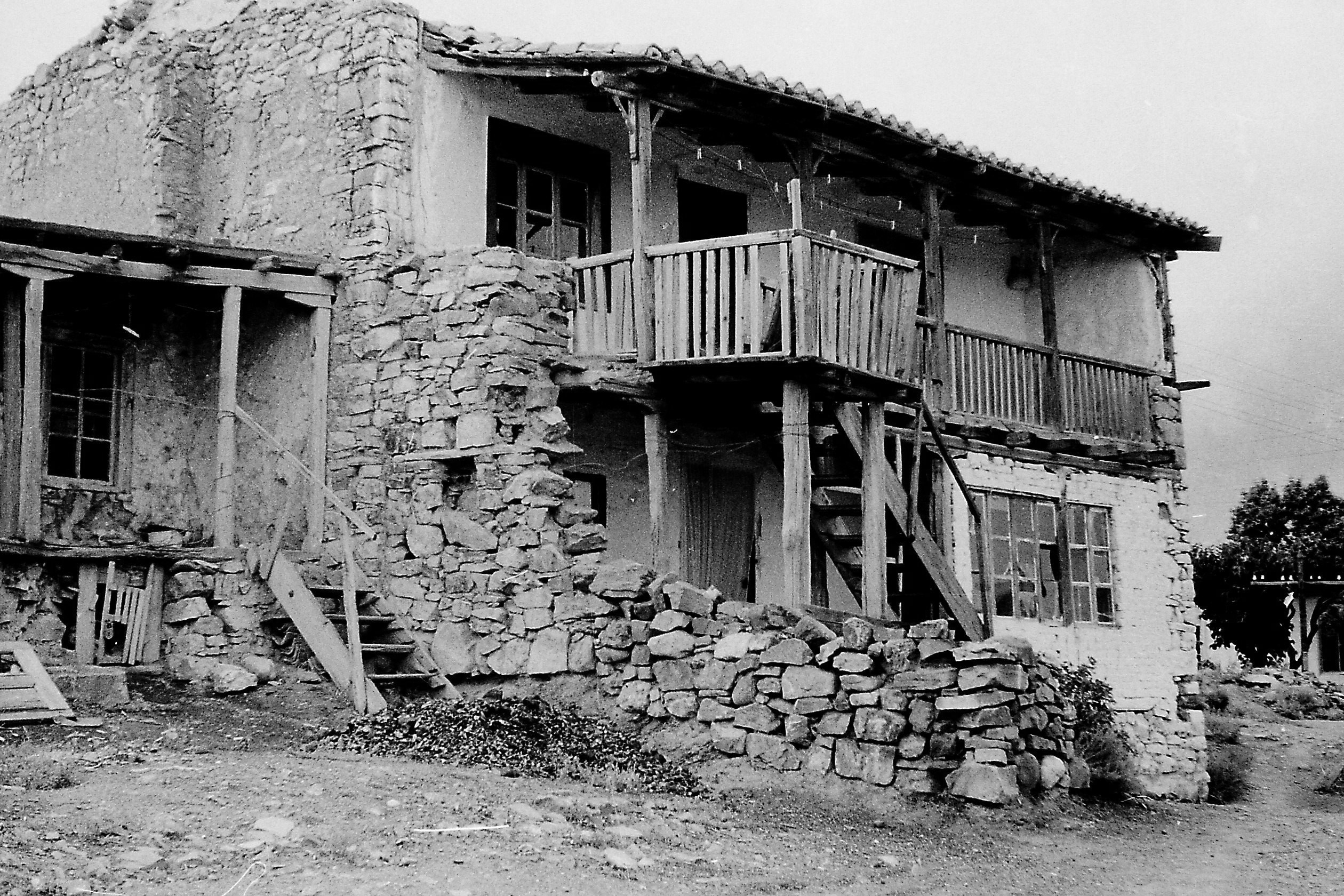
An empty Tatar home in Crimea, photographed in 1968

Stalin's government denied the Crimean Tatars the right to education or publication in their native language. Despite the prohibition, and although they had to study in Russian or Uzbek, they maintained their cultural identity. In 1956 the new Soviet leader, Nikita Khrushchev, held a speech in which he condemned Stalin's policies, including the mass deportations of various ethnicities. Still, even though many peoples were allowed to return to their homes, three groups were forced to stay in exile: the Soviet Germans, the Meskhetian Turks, and the Crimean Tatars. In 1954, Khrushchev allowed Crimea to be included in the Ukrainian Soviet Socialist Republic since Crimea is linked by land to Ukraine and not with the Russian SFSR. On 28 April 1956, the directive "On Removing Restrictions on the Special Settlement of the Crimean Tatars... Relocated during the Great Patriotic War" was issued, ordering a de-registration of the deportees and their release from administrative supervision. However, various other restrictions were still kept and the Crimean Tatars were not allowed to return to Crimea. Moreover, that same year the Ukrainian Council of Ministers banned the exiled Crimean Tatars, Greeks, Germans, Armenians and Bulgarians from relocating even to the Kherson, Zaporizhzhia, Mykolaiv and Odesa Oblasts in the Ukrainian SSR. The Crimean Tatars did not get any compensation for their lost property.

In the 1950s, the Crimean Tatars started actively advocating for the right to return. In 1957, they collected 6,000 signatures in a petition that was sent to the Supreme Soviet of the Soviet Union that demanded their political rehabilitation and return to Crimea. In 1961 25,000 signatures were collected in a petition that was sent to the Kremlin.

Mustafa Dzhemilev, who was only six months old when his family was deported from Crimea, grew up in Uzbekistan and became an activist for the right of the Crimean Tatars to return. In 1966 he was arrested for the first time and spent a total of 17 years in prison during the Soviet era. This earned him the nickname of "Crimean Tatar Mandela". In 1984 he was sentenced for the sixth time for "anti-Soviet activity" but was given moral support by the Soviet dissident Andrei Sakharov, who had observed Dzhemilev's fourth trial in 1976. When older dissidents were arrested, a new, younger generation emerged that would replace them.

On 21 July 1967, representatives of the Crimean Tatars, led by the dissident Ayshe Seitmuratova, gained permission to meet with high-ranking Soviet officials in Moscow, including Yuri Andropov. During the meeting, the Crimean Tatars demanded a correction of all the injustices of the USSR against their people. In September 1967, the Supreme Soviet issued a decree that acknowledged the charge of treason against the entire nation was "unreasonable" but that did not allow Crimean Tatars the same full rehabilitation encompassing the right of return that other deported peoples were given. The carefully worded decree referred to them not as "Crimean Tatars" but as "citizens of Tatar nationality who having formerly lived in Crimea […] have taken root in the Uzbek SSR", thereby minimizing Crimean Tatar existence and downplaying their desire for the right of return in addition to creating a premise for claims of the issue being "settled". Individuals united and formed groups that went back to Crimea in 1968 on their own, without state permission, but the Soviet authorities deported 6,000 of them once again. The most notable example of such resistance was a Crimean Tatar activist, Musa Mamut, who was deported when he was 12 and who returned to Crimea because he wanted to see his home again. When the police informed him that he would be evicted, he set himself on fire. Nevertheless, 577 families managed to obtain state permission to reside in Crimea.

In 1968 unrest erupted among the Crimean Tatar people in the Uzbek city of Chirchiq. In October 1973, the Jewish poet and professor Ilya Gabay committed suicide by jumping off a building in Moscow. He was one of the significant Jewish dissidents in the USSR who fought for the rights of the oppressed peoples, especially Crimean Tatars. Gabay had been arrested and sent to a labour camp but still insisted on his cause because he was convinced that the treatment of the Crimean Tatars by the USSR amounted to genocide. In 1973, Dzhemilev was also arrested for his advocacy for Crimean Tatar right to return to Crimea.

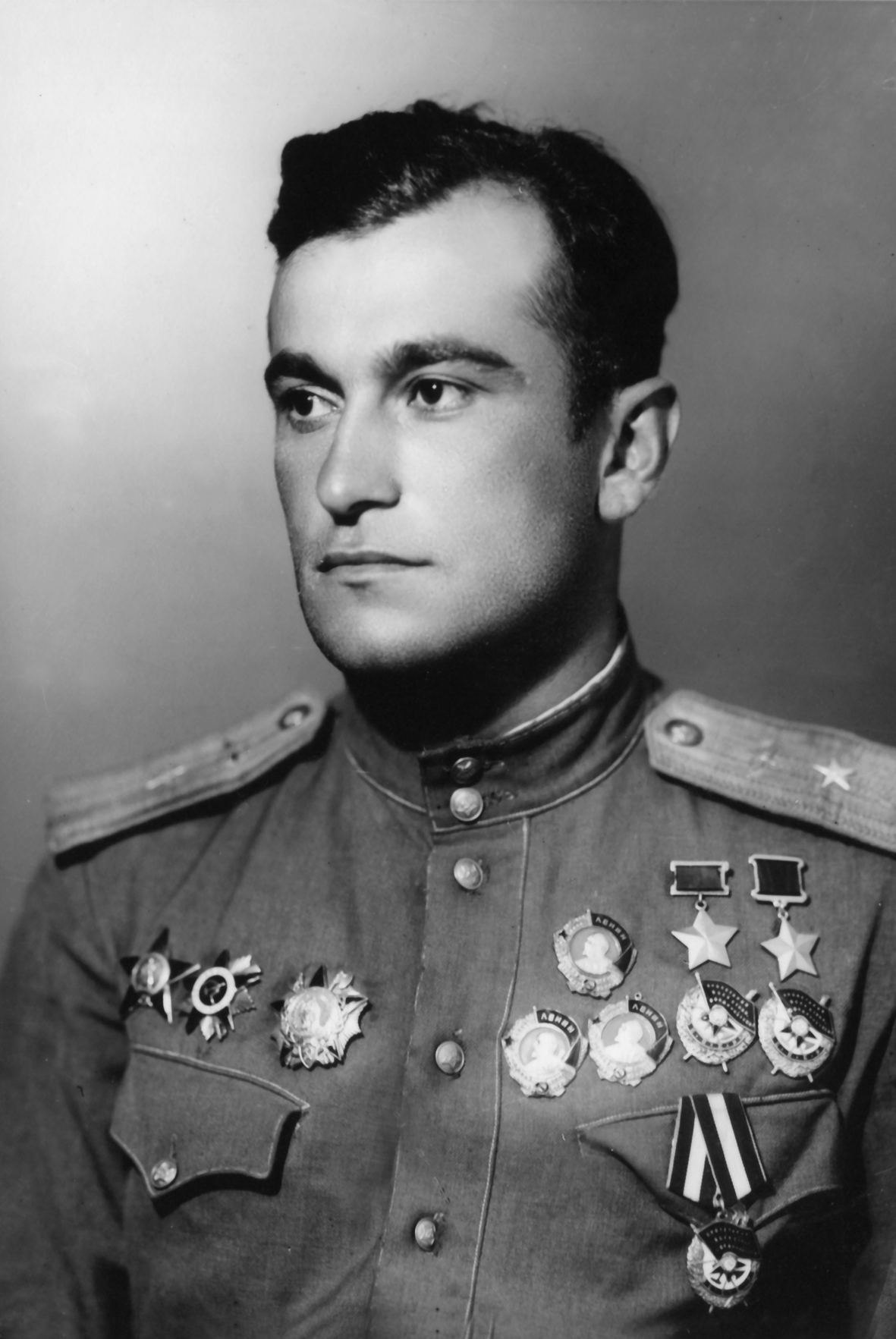
Amet-khan Sultan was a highly decorated Crimean Tatar flying ace who was twice awarded the title of Hero of the Soviet Union. Amet-khan was one of the first people in the Soviet Union to publicly request the rehabilitation and right of return for the Crimean Tatars in 1956.

=== Repatriation ===
Despite de-Stalinization, the situation did not change until Mikhail Gorbachev's perestroika in the late 1980s. A 1987 Tatar protest near the Kremlin prompted Gorbachev to form the Gromyko Commission which found against Tatar claims, but a second commission recommended "renewal of autonomy" for Crimean Tatars. In 1989 the ban on the return of deported ethnicities was declared officially null and void and the Supreme Soviet of the Soviet Union further declared the deportations criminal, paving the way for the Crimean Tatars to return. Dzhemilev returned to Crimea that year, with at least 166,000 other Tatars doing the same by January 1992. The 1991 Russian law On the Rehabilitation of Repressed Peoples rehabilitated all Soviet repressed ethnicities and abolished all previous Russian laws relating to the deportations, calling for the "restoration and return of the cultural and spiritual values and archives which represent the heritage of the repressed people."

By 2004 the Crimean Tatars formed 12% of the population of Crimea. The return was fraught: with Russian nationalist protests in Crimea and clashes between locals and Crimean Tatars near Yalta, which needed army intervention. Local Soviet authorities were reluctant to help returnees with jobs or housing, After the dissolution of the USSR, Crimea was part of Ukraine, but Kyiv gave limited support to Crimean Tatar settlers. Some 150,000 of the returnees were granted citizenship automatically under Ukraine's Citizenship Law of 1991, but 100,000 who returned after Ukraine declared independence faced several obstacles including a costly bureaucratic process.

=== Annexation of Crimea by the Russian Federation ===
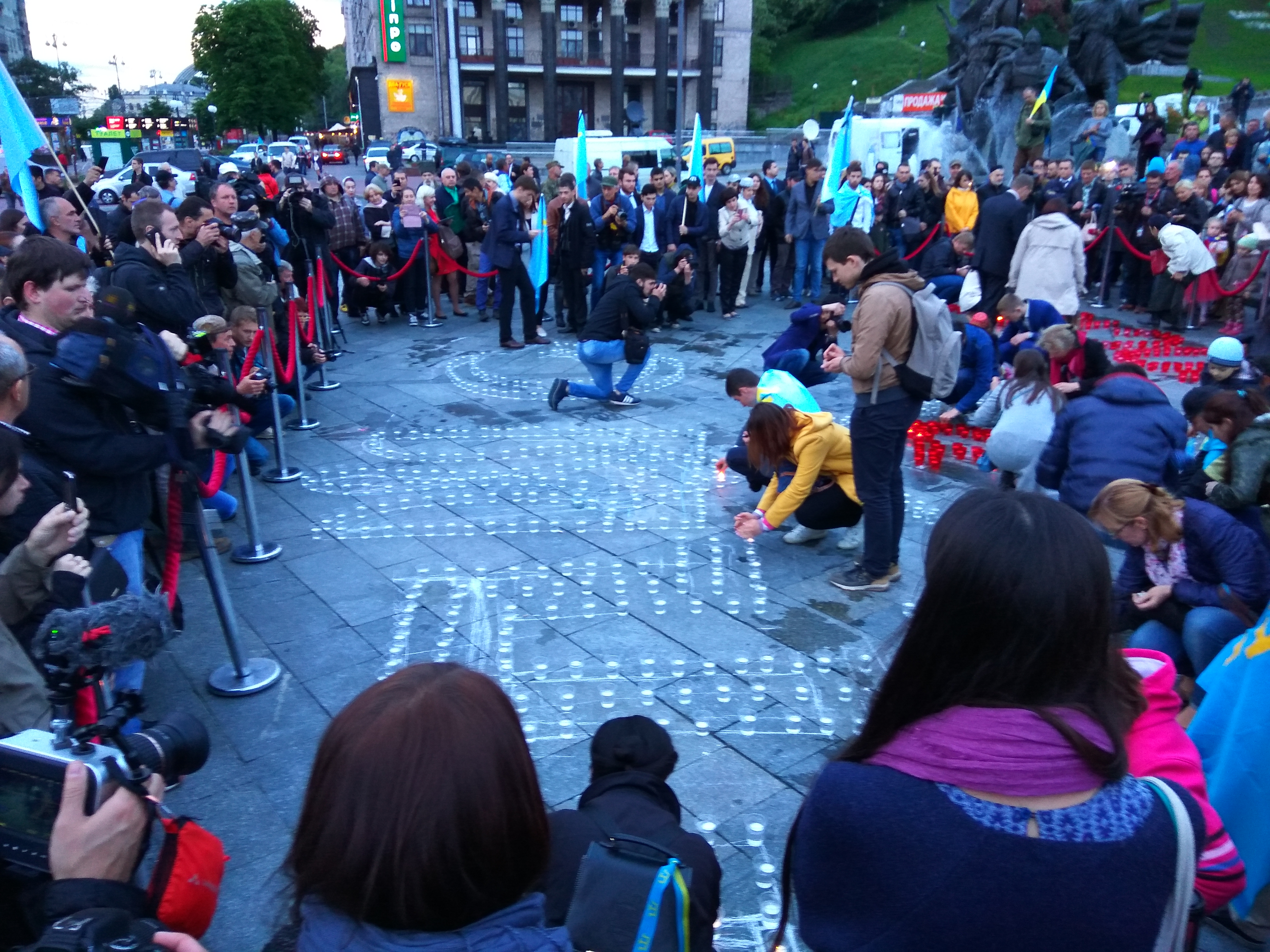
An event commemorating the victims of the Crimean Tatar deportation in Kyiv in 2016

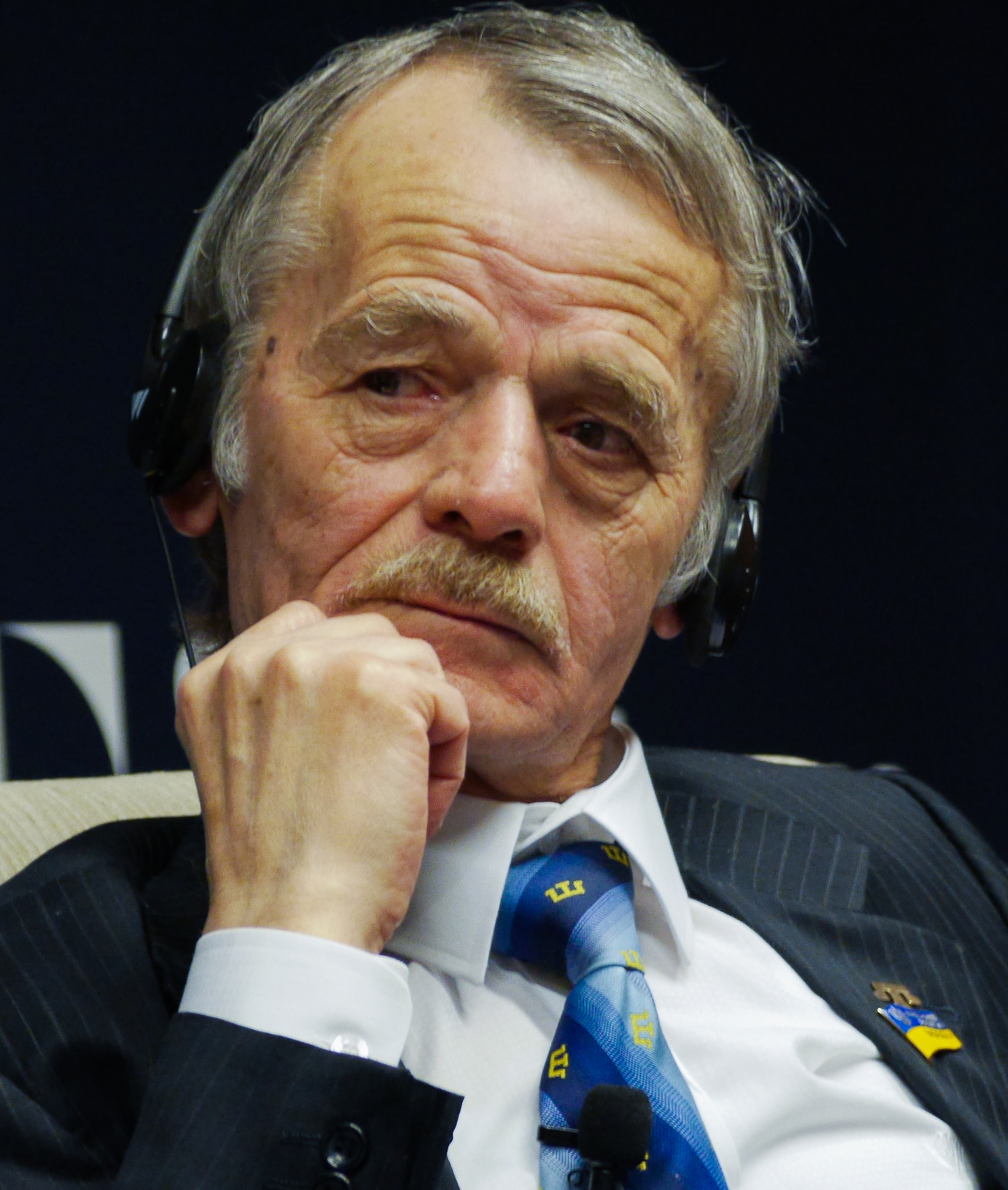
Mustafa Dzhemilev, a Crimean Tatar activist of the OKND faction, spent 17 years in jail for his advocacy

In March 2014, the annexation of Crimea by the Russian Federation unfolded, which was, in turn, declared illegal by the United Nations General Assembly (United Nations General Assembly Resolution 68/262) and which led to further deterioration of the rights of the Crimean Tatars. Even though the Russian Federation issued Decree No. 268 "On the Measures for the Rehabilitation of Armenian, Bulgarian, Greek, Crimean Tatar and German Peoples and the State Support of Their Revival and Development" on 21 April 2014, in practice Russia has intensified persecution of Crimean Tatars and their human rights situation has significantly deteriorated. The Office of the United Nations High Commissioner for Human Rights issued a warning against the Kremlin in 2016 because it "intimidated, harassed and jailed Crimean Tatar representatives, often on dubious charges", while the representative body the Mejlis of the Crimean Tatar People was banned.

The UN reported that of the over 10,000 people left Crimea after the annexation in 2014, most were Crimean Tatars, which caused a further decline of their fragile community. Crimean Tatars stated several reasons for their departure, among them insecurity, fear, and intimidation from the new Russian authorities. In its 2015 report, the Office of the United Nations High Commissioner for Human Rights warned that various human rights violations were recorded in Crimea, including the prevention of Crimean Tatars from marking the 71st anniversary of their deportation.

== Modern views and legacy ==
The KGB collaborators are furious that we are gathering statistical evidence about Crimean Tatars who perished in exile and that we are collecting materials against the sadist commandants who derided the people during the Stalin years and who, according to the precepts of the Nuremberg Tribunal, should be tried for crimes against humanity. As a result of the crime of 1944, I lost thousands upon thousands of my brothers and sisters. And this must be remembered!
— Mustafa Dzhemilev, 1966

Historian Edward Allworth has noted that the extent of marginalization of the Crimean Tatars was a distinct anomaly among national policy in the USSR given the party's firm commitment maintaining the status quo of not recognizing them as a distinct ethnic group in addition to assimilating and "rooting" them in exile, in sharp contrast to the rehabilitation other deported ethnic groups such as the Chechens, Ingush, Karachays, Balkars, and Kalmyks experienced in the Khrushchev era.

Between 1989 and 1994, around a quarter of a million Crimean Tatars returned to Crimea from exile in Central Asia. This was seen as a symbolic victory of their efforts to return to their native land. They returned after 45 years of exile.

Not one of the several ethnic groups who were deported during Stalin's era received any kind of financial compensation. Some Crimean Tatar groups and activists have called for the international community to put pressure on the Russian Federation, the successor state of the USSR, to finance rehabilitation of that ethnicity and provide financial compensation for forcible resettlement.

Symbol of the anniversary of deportation of the Crimean Tatars

Despite the thousands of Crimean Tatars in the Red Army when it attacked Berlin, the Crimean Tatars continued to be seen and treated as a fifth column for decades. Some historians explain this as part of Stalin's plan to use Crimea to gain further control of the Turkish Straits. The Soviets sought access to the Dardanelles and control of territory in Turkey, where the Crimean Tatars had ethnic kin. By painting the Crimean Tatars as traitors, this taint could be extended to their kin. Scholar Walter Kolarz alleges that the deportation and the attempt of liquidation of Crimean Tatars as an ethnicity in 1944 was just the final act of the centuries-long process of Russian colonization of Crimea that started in 1783. Historian Gregory Dufaud regards the Soviet accusations against Crimean Tatars as a convenient excuse for their forcible transfer through which Moscow secured an unrivalled access to the geostrategic southern Black Sea on one hand and eliminated hypothetical rebellious nations at the same time. Professor of Russian and Soviet history Rebecca Manley similarly concluded that the real aim of the Soviet government was to "cleanse" the border regions of "unreliable elements". Professor Brian Glyn Williams states that the deportations of Meskhetian Turks, despite never being close to the scene of combat and never being charged with any crime, lends the strongest credence to the fact that the deportations of Crimeans and Caucasians was due to Soviet foreign policy rather than any real "universal mass crimes".

Modern interpretations by scholars and historians sometimes classify this mass deportation of civilians as a crime against humanity, ethnic cleansing, depopulation, an act of Stalinist repression, or an "ethnocide", meaning a deliberate wiping out of an identity and culture of a nation. Crimean Tatars call this event Sürgünlik ("exile"). The perception of Crimean Tatars as "uncivilized" and deserving the deportation remains throughout the Russian and Ukrainian settlers in Crimea.

=== Genocide question and recognition ===
Some activists, politicians, scholars, countries, and historians go even further and consider the deportation a crime of genocide or cultural genocide. Norman Naimark writes "[t]he Chechens and Ingush, the Crimean Tatars, and other 'punished peoples' of the wartime period were, indeed, slated for elimination, if not physically, then as self-identifying nationalities." Professor Lyman H. Legters argued that the Soviet penal system, combined with its resettlement policies, should count as genocidal since the sentences were borne most heavily specifically on certain ethnic groups, and that a relocation of these ethnic groups, whose survival depends on ties to its particular homeland, "had a genocidal effect remediable only by restoration of the group to its homeland." Political scientist Stephen Blank described it both as a deportation and a genocide, a centuries-long Russian "technique of self-colonial rule intended to eliminate" minorities. Soviet dissidents Ilya Gabay and Pyotr Grigorenko both classified the event as a genocide. Historian Timothy Snyder included it in a list of Soviet policies that "meet the standard of genocide." Historians Alexandre Bennigsen and Marie Bennigsen-Broxup included the case of Crimean Tatars and Meskhetian Turks as two examples of successful genocides by Soviet governments. They summed it up by saying that Crimean Tatars, "a nation which for over five centuries had played a major part in the history of Eastern Europe has simply ceased to exist". Polish scholar Tomasz Kamusella observed that Moscow attempted an "unmaking of Crimean Tatars and their language" by not allowing them even to be registered as Crimean Tatars since the deportation; they could only declare themselves as Tatars. It wasn't until the 1989 census that Crimean Tatars were again recognized as a separate nationality. The Crimean Tatar language was only allowed to be taught again in Soviet schools in the 1980s.

On 12 December 2015, the Ukrainian parliament issued a resolution recognizing this event as genocide and established 18 May as the "Day of Remembrance for the victims of the Crimean Tatar genocide." The parliament of Latvia recognized the event as an act of genocide on 9 May 2019. The parliament of Lithuania did the same on 6 June 2019. The Canadian Parliament passed a motion on June 10, 2019, recognizing the Crimean Tatar deportation of 1944 (Sürgünlik) as a genocide perpetrated by Soviet dictator Stalin, designating May 18 to be a day of remembrance. On 26 April 1991 the Supreme Soviet of the Russian Soviet Federative Socialist Republic, under its chairman Boris Yeltsin, passed the law On the Rehabilitation of Repressed Peoples with Article 2 denouncing all mass deportations as "Stalin's policy of defamation and genocide."

#	Name	Date of recognition	Source
1	Ukraine	12 December 2015	
2	Latvia	9 May 2019	
3	Lithuania	6 June 2019	
4	Canada	10 June 2019	
5	Poland	12 July 2024	
6	Estonia	16 October 2024	
7	Czech Republic	18 December 2024	
8	Netherlands	20 June 2025	

A minority dispute defining the event as genocide. According to Alexander Statiev, the Soviet deportations resulted in a "genocidal death rate", but Stalin did not have the intent to exterminate these peoples. He considers such deportations merely an example of Soviet assimilation of "unwanted nations". According to Amir Weiner, the Soviet regime sought to eradicate "only" their "territorial identity". Such views were criticized by Jon Chang as "gentrified racism" and historical revisionism. He noted that the deportations had been in fact based on ethnicity of victims.

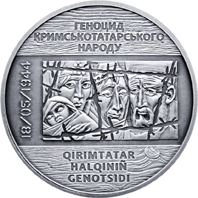
Ukrainian coin commemorating the Genocide of the Crimean Tatars, issued 2015

The projection mapping in Kyiv in 2020 for the Day of Remembrance for the victims of the Crimean Tatar genocide

=== In popular culture ===
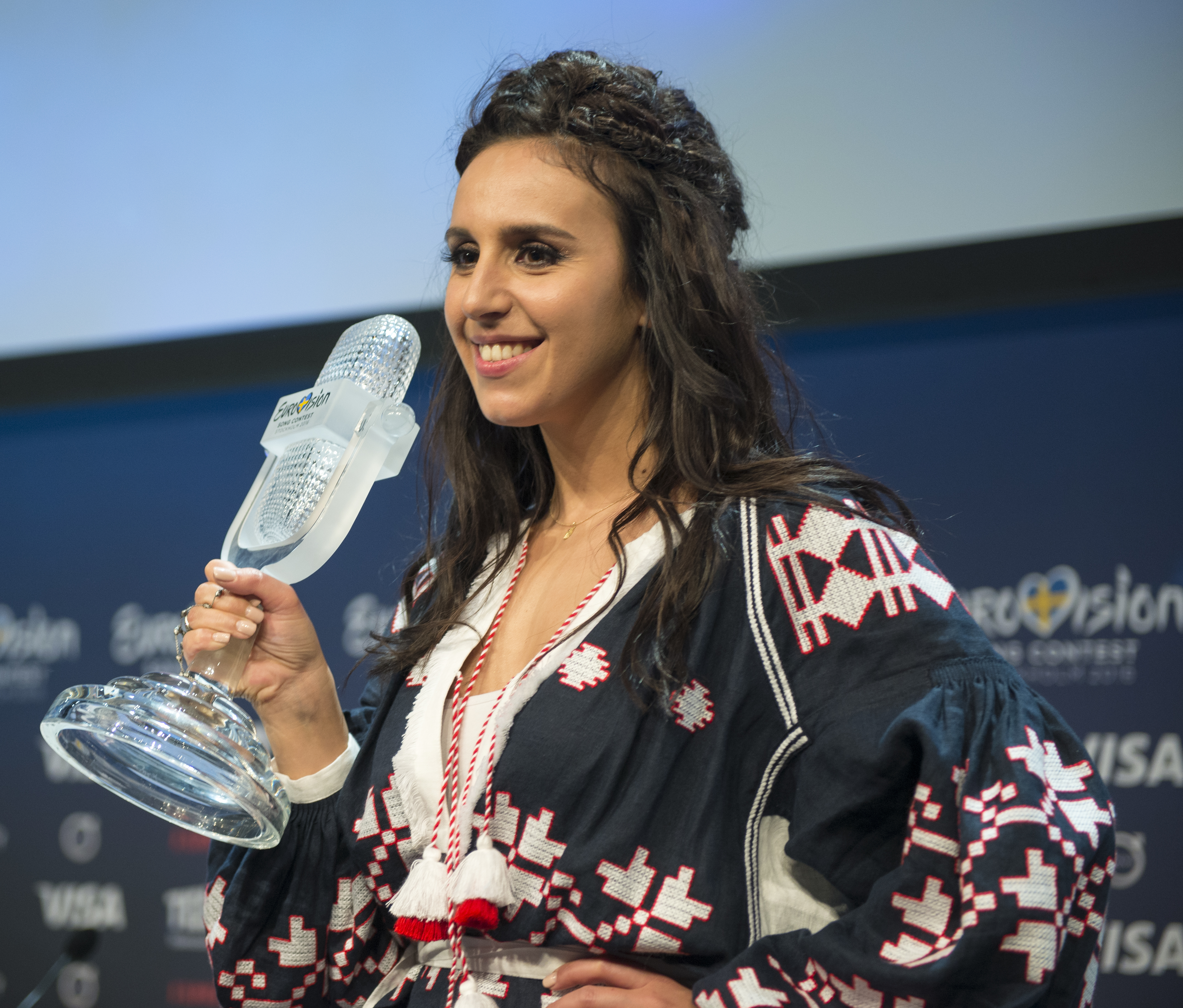
Jamala dedicated her 2016 Eurovision winning song "1944" to the deported Crimean Tatars

In 2008, Lily Hyde, a British journalist living in Ukraine, published a novel titled Dreamland that revolves around a Crimean Tatar family return to their homeland in the 1990s. The story is told from the perspective of a 12-year-old girl who moves from Uzbekistan to a demolished village with her parents, brother, and grandfather. Her grandfather tells her stories about the heroes and victims among the Crimean Tatars.

The 2013 Ukrainian Crimean Tatar-language film Haytarma portrays the experience of Crimean Tatar flying ace and Hero of the Soviet Union Amet-khan Sultan during the 1944 deportations.

In 2015, Christina Paschyn released the documentary film A Struggle for Home: The Crimean Tatars in a Ukrainian–Qatari co-production. It depicts the history of the Crimean Tatars from 1783 up until 2014, with a special emphasis on the 1944 mass deportation.

Crimean Tatar singer Jamala entered the Eurovision Song Contest 2016 with her song "1944", which refers to the deportation of the Crimean Tatars in the eponymous year. Jamala, an ethnic Crimean Tatar born in exile in Kyrgyzstan, dedicated the song to her deported great-grandmother. She became the first Crimean Tatar to perform at Eurovision and also the first to perform with a song with lyrics in the Crimean Tatar language. She went on to win the contest, becoming the second Ukrainian artist to win the event.

== See also ==
- Deportation of the Chechens and Ingush
- Deportation of the Meskhetian Turks
- List of ethnic cleansing campaigns
- List of genocides by death toll

== General and cited sources ==
=== Books ===
- Allworth, Edward (1988). Tatars of the Crimea: Their Struggle for Survival: Original Studies from North America, Unofficial and Official Documents from Czarist and Soviet Sources. Michigan: Columbia University. Center for the Study of Central Asia. ISBN 0822307588.
- Allworth, Edward (1998). The Tatars of Crimea: Return to the Homeland: Studies and Documents. Durham: Duke University Press. ISBN 9780822319948. LCCN 97019110. OCLC 610947243.
- Bazhan, Oleg (2015). "The Rehabilitation of Stalin's Victims in Ukraine, 1953–1964: A Socio-Legal Perspective". In McDermott, Kevin; Stibbe, Matthew (eds.). De-Stalinising Eastern Europe: The Rehabilitation of Stalin's Victims after 1953. Basingstoke: Palgrave Macmillan. ISBN 9781137368928. OCLC 913832228.
- Bennigsen, Alexandre; Broxup, Marie (1983). The Islamic threat to the Soviet State. London: Taylor & Francis. ISBN 9781317831716. LCCN 82016826.
- Besemeres, John (2016). A Difficult Neighbourhood: Essays on Russia and East-Central Europe since World War II. Canberra: ANU Press. ISBN 9781760460617.
- Buckley, Cynthia J.; Ruble, Blair A.; Hofmann, Erin Trouth (2008). Migration, Homeland, and Belonging in Eurasia. Washington, D.C.: Woodrow Wilson Center Press. ISBN 9780801890758. LCCN 2008015571. OCLC 474260740 – via Google Books.
- Bugay, Nikolay (1996). The Deportation of Peoples in the Soviet Union. New York City: Nova Publishers. ISBN 9781560723714. OCLC 36402865 – via Google Books.
- Burleigh, Michael (2001). The Third Reich: A New History. Macmillan. ISBN 978-0-8090-9326-7. OCLC 44084002 – via Google Books.
- Dadabaev, Timur (2015). Identity and Memory in Post-Soviet Central Asia: Uzbekistan's Soviet Past. Milton Park: Routledge. ISBN 9781317567356. LCCN 2015007994. OCLC 1013589408.
- Drohobycky, Maria (1995). Crimea: Dynamics, Challenges and Prospects. Lanham: Rowman & Littlefield. ISBN 9780847680672. LCCN 95012637. OCLC 924871281.
- Ediev, D. М. (2003). Демографические потери народов СССР. Stavropol: СтГАУ "Аргус". ISBN 595960020X. (in Russian)
- Fisher, Alan W. (2014). Crimean Tatars. Stanford, California: Hoover Press. ISBN 9780817966638. LCCN 76041085. OCLC 946788279.
- Garrard, John; Healicon, Alison (1993). World War 2 and the Soviet People: Selected Papers from the Fourth World Congress for Soviet and East European Studies. New York City: Springer. ISBN 9781349227969. LCCN 92010827. OCLC 30408834 – via Google Books.
- Hall, M. Clement (2014). The Crimea: A very short history. Lulu.com. ISBN 978-1-304-97576-8 – via Google Books.
- Kamenetsky, Ihor (1977). Nationalism and Human Rights: Processes of Modernization in the USSR. Littleton, Colorado: Association for the Study of the Nationalities (USSR and East Europe) Incorporated. ISBN 9780872871434. LCCN 77001257.
- Kamusella, Tomasz (2008). The Politics of Language and Nationalism in Modern Central Europe. Basingstoke: Palgrave Macmillan. ISBN 9780230583474. OCLC 943531746.
- Knight, Amy (1995). Beria: Stalin's First Lieutenant. Princeton, N.J.: Princeton University Press. ISBN 9780691010939. LCCN 93003937.
- Kucherenko, Olga (2016). Soviet Street Children and the Second World War: Welfare and Social Control under Stalin. London: Bloomsbury Publishing. ISBN 9781474213448. LCCN 2015043330.
- Kurtiev, Refat; Kandim, Yunus; Muslimova, Edie; Suleymanov, Seyran (2004). Deportatsiya krymskikh tatar 18 maya 1944 goda. Kak eto bylo: vospominaniya deportirovannykh Депортация крымских татар 18 мая 1944 года. Как это было: воспоминания депортированных [Deportation of the Crimean Tatars on May 18, 1944. How it was: memories of the deportees] (in Russian). Simferopol: Odzhak. ISBN 9789668535147. OCLC 255117144 – via Google Books.
- Lee, Jongsoo James (2006). The Partition of Korea After World War II: A Global History. New York City: Springer. ISBN 9781403983015. LCCN 2005054895.
- Legters, Lyman H. (1992). "The American Genocide". In Lyden, Fremont J. (ed.). Native Americans and Public Policy. Pittsburgh: University of Pittsburgh Press. ISBN 9780822976820. OCLC 555693841 – via Google Books.
- Levene, Mark (2013). The crisis of genocide: Annihilation: Volume II: The European Rimlands 1939–1953. New York City: Oxford University Press. ISBN 9780191505553. LCCN 2013942047 – via Google Books.
- Magocsi, Paul R. (2010). A History of Ukraine: The Land and Its Peoples. Toronto: University of Toronto Press. ISBN 9781442610217. LCCN 96020027. OCLC 899979979.
- Makhalova, Irina (2020). Collaboration in the Crimea During the Nazi Occupation (1941–1944) (PDF). Moscow: Higher School of Economics.
- Manley, Rebecca (2012). To The Tashkent Station: Evacuation and Survival in the Soviet Union at War. Ithaca, New York: Cornell University Press. ISBN 9780801457760. OCLC 979968105.
- Merridale, Catherine (2007). Ivan's War: Life and Death in the Red Army, 1939–1945. New York City: Henry Holt and Company. ISBN 9780571265909. LCCN 2005050457.
- Moss, Walter G. (2008). An Age of Progress?: Clashing Twentieth-Century Global Forces. London: Anthem Press. ISBN 9780857286222. LCCN 2007042449. OCLC 889947280.
- Motadel, David (2014). Islam and Nazi Germany's War. Harvard University Press. p. 235. ISBN 9780674724600. OCLC 900907482 – via Google Books.
- Naimark, Norman (2010). Stalin's Genocides. Princeton, N.J.: Princeton University Press. ISBN 9780691152387. LCCN 2010019063 – via Google Books.
- Olson, James Stuart; Pappas, Lee Brigance; Pappas, Nicholas Charles (1994). An Ethnohistorical Dictionary of the Russian and Soviet Empires. Westport, Conn.: Greenwood Publishing Group. ISBN 9780313274978. OCLC 27431039.
- Parrish, Michael (1996). The Lesser Terror: Soviet State Security, 1939–1953. Westport, Conn.: Greenwood Publishing Group. ISBN 9780275951139. OCLC 473448547 – via Google Books.
- Perovic, Jeronim (2018). From Conquest to Deportation: The North Caucasus under Russian Rule. Oxford University Press. p. 320. ISBN 9780190934675. OCLC 1083957407 – via Google Books.
- Polian, Pavel (2004). Against Their Will: The History and Geography of Forced Migrations in the USSR. Budapest; New York City: Central European University Press. ISBN 9789639241688. LCCN 2003019544.
- Reid, Anna (2015). Borderland: A Journey Through the History of Ukraine. New York City: Hachette, UK. ISBN 9781780229287. LCCN 2015938031 – via Google Books.
- Requejo, Ferran; Nagel, Klaus-Jürgen (2016). Federalism Beyond Federations: Asymmetry and Processes of Resymmetrisation in Europe (repeated ed.). Surrey, England: Routledge. ISBN 9781317136125. LCCN 2010033623. OCLC 751970998.
- Rywkin, Michael (1994). Moscow's Lost Empire. Armonk, N.Y.: M. E. Sharpe. ISBN 9781315287713. LCCN 93029308. OCLC 476453248 – via Google Books.
- Sakwa, Richard (2014). Frontline Ukraine: crisis in the borderlands. London: Bloomsbury Publishing. ISBN 9780857724373. OCLC 932794610.
- Sandole, Dennis J.D.; Byrne, Sean; Sandole-Staroste, Ingrid; Senehi, Jessica (2008). Handbook of Conflict Analysis and Resolution. London: Routledge. ISBN 9781134079636. LCCN 2008003476. OCLC 907001072 – via Google Books.
- Shearer, David R.; Khaustov, Vladimir (2015). Stalin and the Lubianka: A Documentary History of the Political Police and Security Organs in the Soviet Union, 1922–1953. Yale University Press. ISBN 9780300171891.
- Skutsch, Carl (2013). Encyclopedia of the World's Minorities. New York: Routledge. ISBN 9781135193881. OCLC 863823479 – via Google Books.
- Smele, Jonathan D. (2015). Historical Dictionary of the Russian Civil Wars, 1916–1926. Lanham: Rowman & Littlefield. ISBN 9781442252813. OCLC 985529980.
- Smoly, Valery (2004). Кримські татари: шлях до повернення : кримськотатарський національний рух (друга половина 1940-х-початок 1990-х років) очима Радянських спецслужб : збірник документів та матеріалів (in Ukrainian). Kyiv: Ін-т історії України. ISBN 978-966-02-3286-0 – via Google Books.
- Spring, Peter (2015). Great Walls and Linear Barriers. Barnsley, South Yorkshire: Pen and Sword Books. ISBN 9781473853843. LCCN 2015458193.
- Studies on the Soviet Union (1970). Studies on the Soviet Union. Munich: Institute for the Study of the USSR. OCLC 725829715.
- Stronski, Paul (2010). Tashkent: Forging a Soviet City, 1930–1966. Pittsburgh: University of Pittsburgh Press. ISBN 9780822973898. LCCN 2010020948.
- Syed, Muzaffar Husain; Akhtar, Saud; Usmani, B.D. (2011). A Concise History of Islam. New Delhi: Vij Books India. ISBN 9789382573470. OCLC 868069299.
- Tanner, Arno (2004). The Forgotten Minorities of Eastern Europe: The History and Today of Selected Ethnic Groups in Five Countries. Helsinki: East-West Books. ISBN 9789529168088. LCCN 2008422172. OCLC 695557139 – via Google Books.
- Tatz, Colin; Higgins, Winton (2016). The Magnitude of Genocide. Santa Barbara, CA: ABC-CLIO. ISBN 9781440831614. LCCN 2015042289. OCLC 930059149 – via Google Books.
- Travis, Hannibal (2010). Genocide in the Middle East: The Ottoman Empire, Iraq, and Sudan. Durham, N.C.: Carolina Academic Press. ISBN 9781594604362. LCCN 2009051514. OCLC 897959409.
- Tweddell, Colin E.; Kimball, Linda Amy (1985). Introduction to the Peoples and Cultures of Asia. Englewood Cliffs, N.J.: Prentice-Hall. ISBN 9780134915722. LCCN 84017763. OCLC 609339940.
- Uehling, Greta (2004). Beyond Memory: The Crimean Tatars' Deportation and Return. Palgrave. ISBN 9781403981271. LCCN 2003063697. OCLC 963444771 – via Google Books.
- Vardy, Steven Béla; Tooley, T. Hunt; Vardy, Agnes Huszar (2003). Ethnic Cleansing in Twentieth-century Europe. New York City: Social Science Monographs. ISBN 9780880339957. OCLC 53041747.
- Viola, Lynne (2007). The Unknown Gulag: The Lost World of Stalin's Special Settlements. Oxford: Oxford University Press. ISBN 9780195187694. LCCN 2006051397. OCLC 456302666.
- Weiner, Amir (2003). Landscaping the Human Garden: Twentieth-century Population Management in a Comparative Framework. Stanford, California: Stanford University Press. ISBN 9780804746304. LCCN 2002010784. OCLC 50203946.
- Wezel, Katja (2016). Geschichte als Politikum: Lettland und die Aufarbeitung nach der Diktatur [History as a political issue: Latvia and coming to terms with it after the dictatorship] (in German). Berlin: BWV Verlag. ISBN 9783830534259. OCLC 951013191.
- Williams, Brian Glyn (2001). The Crimean Tatars: The Diaspora Experience and the Forging of a Nation. Boston: Brill. ISBN 9789004121225. LCCN 2001035369. OCLC 46835306.
- Williams, Brian Glyn (2015). The Crimean Tatars: From Soviet Genocide to Putin's Conquest. London, New York: Oxford University Press. ISBN 9780190494728. LCCN 2015033355. OCLC 910504522.

=== Online news reports ===
- Banerji, Robin (23 October 2012). "Crimea's Tatars: A fragile revival". BBC News.
- Colborne, Michael (19 May 2016). "For Crimean Tatars, it is about much more than 1944". Al Jazeera.
- Grytsenko, Oksana (8 July 2013). "'Haytarma', the first Crimean Tatar movie, is a must-see for history enthusiasts". Kyiv Post.
- John, Tara (13 May 2016). "The Dark History Behind Eurovision's Ukraine Entry". Time.
- Kamm, Henry (8 February 1992). "Chatal Khaya Journal; Crimean Tatars, Exiled by Stalin, Return Home". The New York Times.
- Lillis, Joanna (2014). "Uzbekistan: Long Road to Exile for the Crimean Tatars". EurasiaNet.
- Nechepurenko, Ivan (26 April 2016). "Tatar Legislature Is Banned in Crimea". The New York Times.
- O'Neil, Lorena (1 August 2014). "Telling Crimea's Story Through Children's Books". NPR.
- Shabad, Theodore (11 March 1984). "Crimean Tatar Sentenced to 6th Term of Detention". The New York Times.
- "Crimean Tatars recall mass exile". BBC News. 18 May 2004.
- "A Struggle for Home: The Crimean Tatars". International Documentary Film Festival Amsterdam. 2016. Archived from the original on 4 August 2017.
- "Ukraine's Parliament Recognizes 1944 'Genocide' Of Crimean Tatars". Radio Free Europe. 21 January 2016.
- "Crimea Tatars say leader banned by Russia from returning". Reuters. 22 April 2014.
- "The Ukrainian Quarterly, Volumes 60–61". Ukrainian Congress Committee of America. 2004 – via Google Books.
- "Some 10,000 people in Ukraine now affected by displacement, UN agency says". UN News Centre. 20 May 2014.

=== Journal articles ===
- Bezverkha, Anastasia (2017). "Reinstating Social Borders between the Slavic Majority and the Tatar Population of Crimea: Media Representation of the Contested Memory of the Crimean Tatars' Deportation". Journal of Borderlands Studies. 32 (2): 127–139. doi:10.1080/08865655.2015.1066699. S2CID 148535821.
- Blank, Stephen (2015). "A Double Dispossession: The Crimean Tatars After Russia's Ukrainian War". Genocide Studies and Prevention. 9 (1): 18–32. doi:10.5038/1911-9933.9.1.1271.
- Chang, Jon K. (2019). "Ethnic Cleansing and Revisionist Russian and Soviet History". Academic Questions. 32 (2): 270. doi:10.1007/s12129-019-09791-8 (inactive 11 July 2025). S2CID 150711796.
- Dufaud, Grégory (2007). "La déportation des Tatars de Crimée et leur vie en exil (1944–1956): Un ethnocide?" [The deportation of the Crimean Tatars and their life in exile (1944–1956): An ethnocide?]. Vingtième Siècle. Revue d'Histoire (in French). 96 (1): 151–162. doi:10.3917/ving.096.0151. JSTOR 20475182.
- Finnin, Rory (2011). "Forgetting Nothing, Forgetting No One: Boris Chichibabin, Viktor Nekipelov, and the Deportation of the Crimean Tatars". The Modern Language Review. 106 (4): 1091–1124. doi:10.5699/modelangrevi.106.4.1091. JSTOR 10.5699/modelangrevi.106.4.1091. S2CID 164399794.
- Fisher, Alan W. (1987). "Emigration of Muslims from the Russian Empire in the Years After the Crimean War". Jahrbücher für Geschichte Osteuropas. 35 (3): 356–371. JSTOR 41047947.
- Hirsch, Francine (2002). "Race without the Practice of Racial Politics". Slavic Review. 61 (1): 30–43. doi:10.2307/2696979. JSTOR 2696979. S2CID 147121638.
- Pohl, J. Otto (2010). "The False Charges of Treason against the Crimean Tatars" (PDF). International Committee for Crimea. 18.
- Özçelik, Sezai (2020). "The Russian Occupation of Crimea in 2014: The Second Sürgün (The Soviet Genocide) of the Crimean Tatars". TroyAcademy. 5 (1): 29–44. doi:10.31454/usb.721939.
- Potichnyj, Peter J. (1975). "The Struggle of the Crimean Tatars". Canadian Slavonic Papers. 17 (2–3): 302–319. doi:10.1080/00085006.1975.11091411. JSTOR 40866872.
- Rosefielde, Steven (1997). "Documented homicides and excess deaths: New insights into the scale of killing in the USSR during the 1930s". Communist and Post-Communist Studies. 30 (3): 321–331. doi:10.1016/S0967-067X(97)00011-1. PMID 12295079.
- Statiev, Alexandar (2010). "Soviet ethnic deportations: intent versus outcome". Journal of Genocide Research. 11 (2–3): 243–264. doi:10.1080/14623520903118961. S2CID 71905569.
- Uehling, Greta (2002). "Sitting on Suitcases: Ambivalence and Ambiguity in the Migration Intentions of Crimean Tatar Women". Journal of Refugee Studies. 15 (4): 388–408. doi:10.1093/jrs/15.4.388.
- Uehling, Greta (2015). "Genocide's Aftermath: Neostalinism in Contemporary Crimea". Genocide Studies and Prevention. 9 (1): 3–17. doi:10.5038/1911-9933.9.1.1273.
- Vardys, V. Stanley (1971). "The Case of the Crimean Tatars". The Russian Review. 30 (2): 101–110. doi:10.2307/127890. JSTOR 127890.
- Weiner, Amir (2002). "Nothing but Certainty". Slavic Review. 61 (1): 44–53. doi:10.2307/2696980. JSTOR 2696980. S2CID 159548222.
- Williams, Brian Glyn (2002a). "Hidden ethnocide in the Soviet Muslim borderlands: The ethnic cleansing of the Crimean Tatars". Journal of Genocide Research. 4 (3): 357–373. doi:10.1080/14623520220151952. S2CID 72722630.
- Williams, Brian Glyn (2002b). "The Hidden Ethnic Cleansing of Muslims in the Soviet Union: The Exile and Repatriation of the Crimean Tatars". Journal of Contemporary History. 37 (3): 323–347. doi:10.1177/00220094020370030101. JSTOR 3180785. S2CID 220874696.
- Zeghidour, Sliman (2014). "Le désert des Tatars" [The Tatar desert]. Médium (in French). 40 (3): 83–91. doi:10.3917/mediu.040.0083.

=== International and NGO sources ===
- Prokopchuk, Natasha (8 June 2005). Tan, Vivian (ed.). "Helping Crimean Tatars feel at home again". UNHCR.
- Amnesty International (1973). "A Chronicle of Current Events" (PDF). Journal of the Human Rights Movement in the USSR (28–31).
- Human Rights Watch (1991). "'Punished Peoples' of the Soviet Union: The Continuing Legacy of Stalin's Deportations" (PDF). New York. LCCN 91076226.
- Office of the United Nations High Commissioner for Human Rights (2015). "Report on the human rights situation in Ukraine" (PDF).
- Office of the United Nations High Commissioner for Human Rights (2014). "Report of the Special Rapporteur on minority issues, Rita Izsák – Addendum – Mission to Ukraine" (PDF).
- Office of the United Nations High Commissioner for Human Rights (2016). Rupert Colville (ed.). "Press briefing notes on Crimean Tatars". Geneva.
