= Friendship of peoples =

Concept advanced by Marxist social class theory

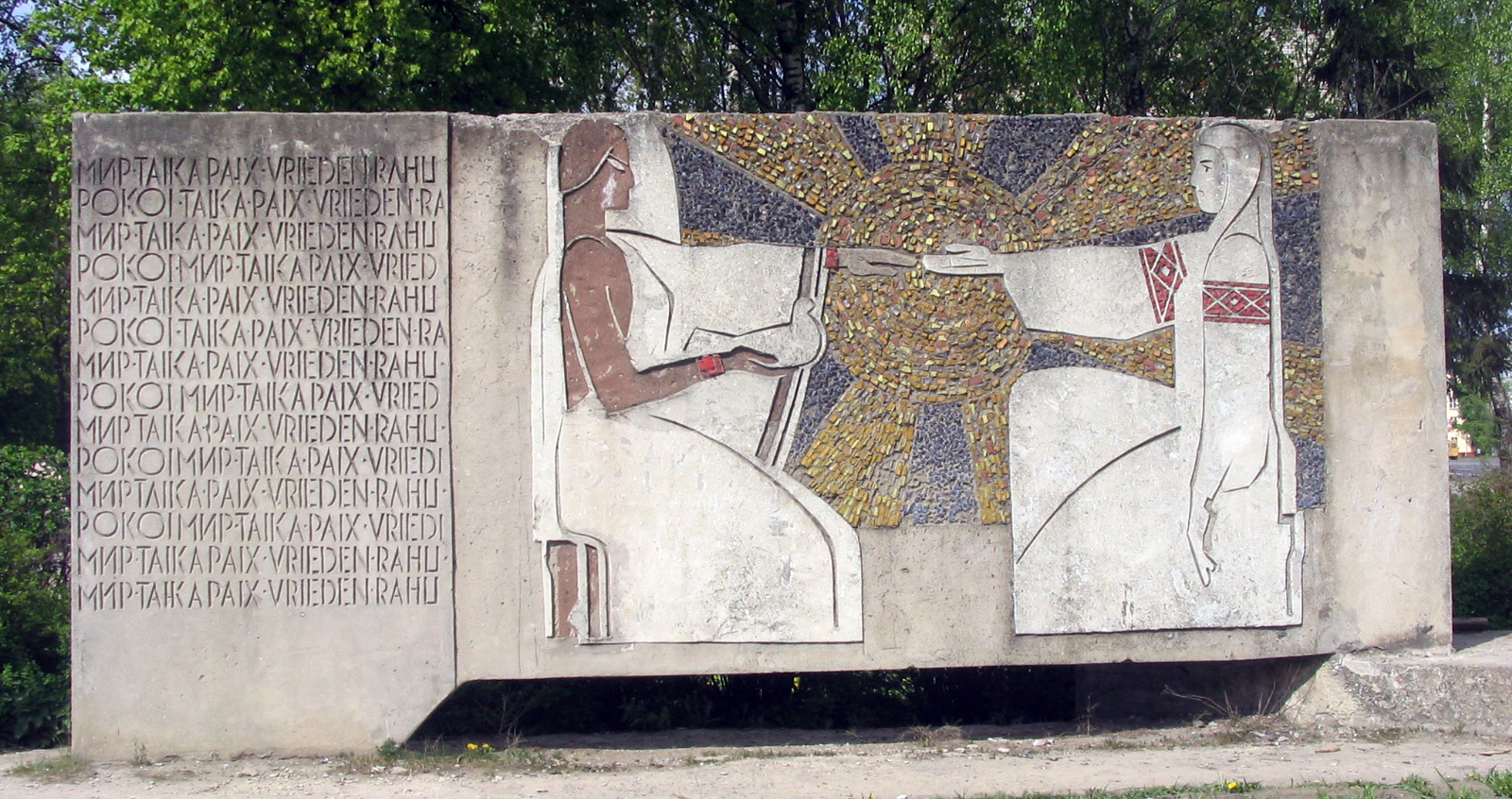
A Soviet monument in Ivanovo, Russia, dedicated to the concept

Friendship of peoples (Russian: дружба народов, druzhba narodov) is a concept advanced by Marxist social class theory. According to Marxism, nationalism is only a tool of the ruling class, used to keep the working class divided and thus easier to control and exploit. With the success of class struggle (i.e. the abolition of social classes), the natural brotherhood of all workers would make the idea of separate nations obsolete.

The concept of the friendship of peoples is often opposed to "bourgeois cosmopolitanism". The concept of friendship of peoples was opposed to the concept of internationalism. In this context, the notion of internationalism was explained as "bourgeois cosmopolitanism", so the notion of "internationalism" was conceptually replaced by the notion of "international socialism", also known as "proletarian internationalism".

== History ==
Tsarist Russia was dubbed the "prison of the peoples" ("тюрьма народов") by Vladimir Lenin. The Soviet Union, which replaced the empire, proclaimed that the goal of its national policy was to forge a new national entity, the "Soviet people". Leading up to and during the establishment of Bolshevik power, the friendship of peoples narrative limited the scope of Russian exceptionalism, however, throughout World War II the metaphor experienced a reconfiguration and the leading role of Russians in the October Revolution, as well as cultural and technological advancements of the Soviet Union was increasingly emphasized. Under Joseph Stalin despite the ubiquitous slogan of "friendship of the peoples" between 1939 and 1953 a total of approximately 6 million people from many of the Soviet Union's ethnic minorities (Poles, Romanians, Lithuanians, Latvians, Estonians, Volga Germans, Finns, Crimean Tatars, Crimean Greeks, Kalmyks, Balkars, Karachays, Meskhetian Turks, Koreans, Chechens, Ingush, and others) were forcefully resettled or deported, often to remote locations in the Far East or Central Asia, 1.5 million of whom died of disease or hunger, which in some cases made up more than 40 percent of a deported population.

By the late 1930s, Soviet publications had begun to describe the Russian people as the "elder brother" (старший брат) of the other Soviet peoples and the "first among equals". A programmatic 1938 article in Istoricheskii zhurnal credited the Russian people with the leading role in the revolution and with having "defended the culture of Europe" by halting the Mongol-Tatar advance — expressly denying that role to "the Polish lords and szlachta", whom it described as hanging on the Soviet western border as "the vilest dogs of German 'knighthood', of German fascism".

The Constitution of the Soviet Union of 1977 stated: "The union of the working class, the collective farm peasantry and the people's intelligentsia, the friendship of peoples and nationalities of the USSR have been strengthened." Some historians evaluating the Soviet Union as a colonial empire, applied the "prison of nations" idea to the USSR. Thomas Winderl wrote "The USSR became in a certain sense more a prison-house of nations than the old Empire had ever been." Historian Kevin O'Connor similarly described the concept "friendship of peoples" as "a metaphor that was intended to signify the existence of a multinational community on Soviet soil, but which in reality put the Russians "first among equals."

== See also ==
- Bourgeois nationalism
- Cosmopolitanism
- Proletarian internationalism
- Order of Friendship of Peoples
- All-Russian nation
