= Chantal Lemercier-Quelquejay =

French writer

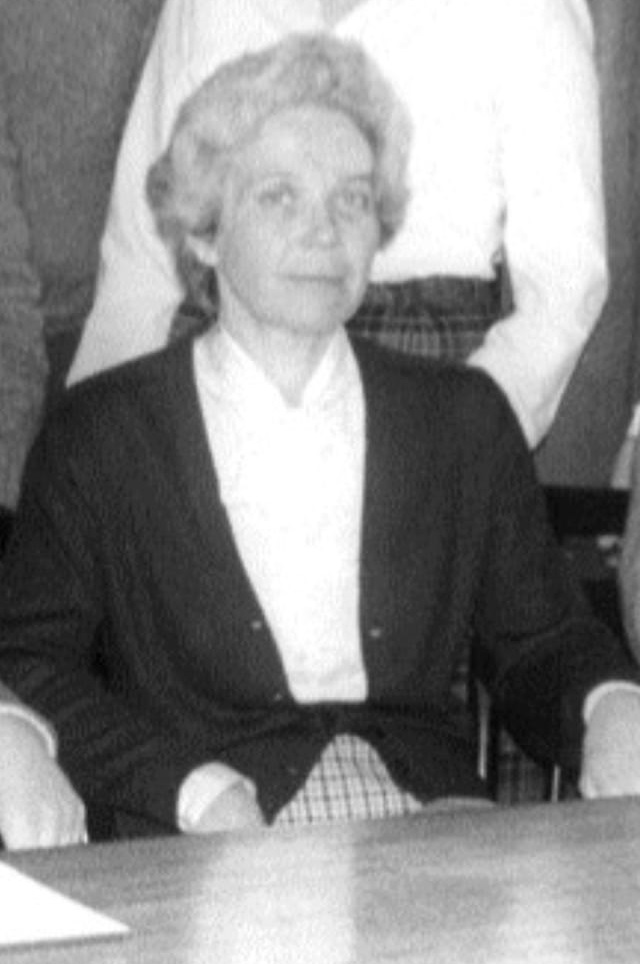
- Chantal Lemercier-Quelquejay in 1981
- Born: 28 June 1926; Yvetot, Seine-Maritime, France
- Died: 13 June 2018 (age 91); Rouen, Seine-Maritime, France
- Occupations: Writer and historian

Jeanne Chantal Marie-Louise Lemercier-Quelquejay (28 June 1926 – 13 June 2018) was a French writer and historian, whose work often focused on Islam in the Soviet Union.

== Biography ==
Lemercier-Quelquejay was born in Yvetot, Seine-Maritime. Lemercier-Quelquejay collaborated with scholar Alexandre Bennigsen on several publications. Their studies were "largely responsible for bringing Russian Islam into the orbit of Western scholarship." Lemercier-Quelquejay died in 2018, at the age of 91, in Rouen.

== Publications ==
In addition to several books with Alexandre Bennigsen, including the "landmark" Islam in the Soviet Union (1965), Lemercier-Quelquejay's scholarly work appeared in journals including Cahiers du Monde russe et soviétique, Harvard Ukrainian Studies, Religion in Communist Lands, and Central Asian Survey.

- The Evolution of the Muslim Nationalities of the USSR and Their Linguistic Problems (1961, with Alexandre Bennigsen)
- "Un document inédit sur la campagne de Russie de 1812" (1963)
- "Les bibliothèques et les archives de Turquie en tant que sources de documents sur l'histoire de Russie" (1964)
- "La Russie, la France et la Turquie a la veille de la Campagne de Russie, Un document inédit des Archives de l'Empire Ottoman" (1965)
- "La campagne de Pierre le Grand sur le Prut: D'après les documents des Archives Ottomanes" (1966)
- "Les missions orthodoxes en pays musulmans de Moyenne- et Basse-Volga, 1552-1865" (1967)
- Islam in the Soviet Union (1965, 1967, with Alexandre Bennigsen)
- "Un condottiere lithuanien du XVIe siècle: Le prince Dimitrij Višneveckij et l'origine de la Seč Zaporogue d'après les Archives ottomanes" (1969)
- "Les marchands de la Cour ottomane et le commerce des fourrures moscovites dans la seconde moitié du xvie siècle" (1970, with Alexandre Bennigsen)
- "Three Ottoman Documents Concerning Bohdan Xmel'nyckyj" (1977)
- "Muslim religious conservatism and dissent in the USSR" (1978, with Alexandre Bennigsen)
- "'Official' Islam in the Soviet Union" (1979, with Alexandre Bennigsen)
- "Azerbaijan: The Foreign Influences" (1980)
- "La structure sociale, politique et religieuse du Caucase du nord au XVIe siècle" (1984)
- "From tribe to Umma" (1984)
- "Soviet Experience of Muslim Guerrilla Warfare and the War in Afghanistan" (1984, with Alexandre Bennigsen)
- Le soufi et le commissaire: Les confréries musulmanes en URSS (1988, with Alexandre Bennigsen)
- Les mouvements nationaux chez les musulmans de Russie, II: La presse et le mouvement national chez les musulmans de Russie avant 1920 (2020, with Alexandre Bennigsen)
