= Ilya Gabay =

Russian writer (1935–1973)

Ilya Yankelevich Gabay
- Илья Янкелевич Габай
- Born: October 9, 1935; Baku
- Died: October 20, 1973 (aged 38); Moscow
- Citizenship: Soviet Union
- Education: Moscow State Pedagogical Institute
- Occupation: teacher
- Known for: human rights activism
- Movement: dissident movement in the Soviet Union
- Spouse: Galina Viktorovna Gabay (Samohena)
- Children: Alexei, Maria

Ilya Yankelevich Gabay (Russian: Илья́ Янкеле́вич Габа́й, IPA: [ɪˈlʲjæ jənkʲɪˈlʲevʲɪtɕ ɡɐˈbaj]; 9 October 1935 in Baku – 20 October 1973 in Moscow; buried in Baku) was a key figure in the civil rights movement in the Soviet Union. Gabay, who was Jewish, was also a literature teacher, poet, and writer. During his lifetime, his works were published only in samizdat.

During the trial of writers Andrei Sinyavsky and Yuli Daniel in 1965, Gabay took part in the "glasnost meeting" calling for an open and fair trial for the writers. On January 22, 1967, he participated in a demonstration in defense of the arrested dissidents Yuri Galanskov, Vera Lashkova, Alexey Dobrovolsky, and Pavel Radzievsky, a case known as the Trial of the Four. After the demonstration, he was arrested and spent five months in Lefortovo prison. He was released in June 1967, and his case was closed.

After his release, he, together with Yuli Kim and Peter Yakir, co-authored an appeal warning against Re-Stalinization. He also assisted Natalya Gorbanevskaya in editing the Chronicle of Current Events, most notably for issue No. 3 dedicated to the 1968 Red Square demonstration against the Soviet invasion of Czechoslovakia. Through fellow dissident Pyotr Grigorenko, Gabay also became involved in the struggle for the Crimean Tatar autonomy and helped edit its samizdat publications.

In March 1968, Gabay was dismissed as an editor at the Institute of the Peoples of Asia of the Academy of Sciences of the Soviet Union and in May 1969, he was arrested and imprisoned. In January 1970, he was tried on the charge of preparing and circulating samizdat materials and sentenced to three years in a general-regime camp. Shortly before the end of the sentence, he was also questioned in Moscow in connection with the case against the Chronicle of Current Events ("Case No. 24").

After Gabay's release in May 1972, he remained unemployed and was subjected to KGB harassment. He committed suicide on October 20, 1973.

He was the husband of Galina Viktorovna Gabay (née Samohena), and the father of two children, Alexei Ilyich Gabay (2/13/69) and Maria Ilyinichna Gabay (6/21/73).

== Bibliography ==
- Gabai, Ilya (1990). Posokh: Stikhi i poemy [The walking staff: Poems and verses] (in Russian). Moskva: Izd-vo "Prometeĭ" MGPI im V.I. Lenina. ISBN 978-5-7042-0261-5.
- Gabai, Ilya; Edelman, G. S. (1994). "Vybrannye mesta": stichi, proza, publicistika, pisʹma. Istorija inakomyslija (in Russian). Moskva: Vestʹ-VIMO. ISBN 978-5-88633-006-9.
- Gabay, Ilya; Gabaĭ-Fiken, G. (2011). "...Gorstka knig da druzhestva..." (in Russian). Boston, MA: M-Graphics Publishing. ISBN 978-1-934881-44-6.
- Gabay, Ilya (2015). Pis'ma iz zaklyucheniya (1970–1972) [Letters from prison (1970–1972)] (in Russian). Moscow: Novoe literaturnoe obozrenie. ISBN 978-5-4448-0417-9.
