= On the Rehabilitation of Repressed Peoples =

1991 Soviet and 1993 Russian law

On the Rehabilitation of Repressed Peoples (Russian: Закон РСФСР от 26 апреля 1991 г. N 1107-I "О реабилитации репрессированных народов") is the law N 1107-I of the Russian Soviet Federative Socialist Republic signed on April 29, 1991 and updated by the July 1, 1993 law N 5303-I of the Russian Federation.

The law was preceded by the Declaration of the USSR Supreme Soviet of November 14, 1989 "On the recognition as unlawful and criminal of repressive measures against peoples subjected to forced deportation and on the guaranteeing of their rights".

The 1991 law had various deficiencies, such as vague phrasing in important places, as well as lack of specifics and mechanisms of its implementation.

After the annexation of Crimea by Russia, on April 21, 2014, Vladimir Putin signed a decree "On the Measures for the Rehabilitation of Armenian, Bulgarian, Greek, Crimean Tatar and German Peoples and the State Support of Their Revival and Development". The decree addressed the status of the mentioned peoples which resided in the Crimean ASSR and were deported from there. They were not covered by the 1991/1993 law, because Crimea was not part of the Russian Federation.

== Sources ==
- Закон РСФСР от 26 апреля 1991 года № 1107-I «О реабилитации репрессированных народов» // s:ru:Закон РСФСР от 26.04.1991 № 1107-I (in Russian)
- Постановление Верховного Совета CCCP от 7 марта 1991 года № 2013-I «Об отмене законодательных актов в связи с Декларацией Верховного Совета СССР от 14 ноября 1989 года «О признании незаконными и преступными репрессивных актов против народов, подвергшихся насильственному переселению, и обеспечении их прав»» // s:ru:Постановление ВС СССР от 07.03.1991 № 2013-I (in Russian)
- Декларация Верховного Совета CCCP от 14 ноября 1989 года «О признании незаконными и преступными репрессивных актов против народов, подвергшихся насильственному переселению, и обеспечении их прав» // s:ru:Декларация ВС СССР от 14.11.1989 (in Russian)
