= Nikolai Bugay =

Russian historian (1941)

Nikolai Fyodorovich Bugay (Russian: Никола́й Фёдорович Буга́й; born 19 December 1941) is a Russian historian who has made a number of controversial claims while attempting to justify deportations of ethnic minorities in the USSR. Despite his controversies, he remains in academia and is an adviser of the Department of Interethnic Relations of the Ministry of Regional Development of Russia.

== Early life ==
Born in Starotitarovskaya, Krasnodar Krai, Bugay graduated from the Kabardino-Balkarian State University in 1968.

== Career and controversy ==
In 1977 he was the scientific secretary of international relations of the Institute of Russian History of the Russian Academy of Sciences and head of the Group of History of National Relations in the USSR (Russia). In March 2002 he was chosen to be consultant, advisor to the Regional Development Department of the Government Office of the Russian Federation. Since January 2005 he is advisor to the Department of Inter-Ethnic Relations of the Ministry of Regional Development of the Russian Federation.

Bugay has published numerous works attempting to justify Stalinist repressions, mainly the deportations of ethnic minorities, including the Koreans, Kalmyks, Balkars, Karachays, Chechens, Meskhetian Turks, and Crimean Tatars. He came under heavy criticism for quoting a telegram by Beria out of context to completely change the meaning on page 147 of his book about deportations in the Caucasus. In full context, the quote shows Beria decided to look for information about alleged Balkar desertion after deciding he wanted them deported, but by omitting a fragment Bugay implied that Beria researched Balkar desertion and then decided he wanted the deportation - a critical timing difference completely changing the meaning and rational of the deportation. After being called out for the misleading writing in 2003, he did not get demoted in academia and remains in multiple influential positions in Russian historical societies.
