= Alexandre Bennigsen =

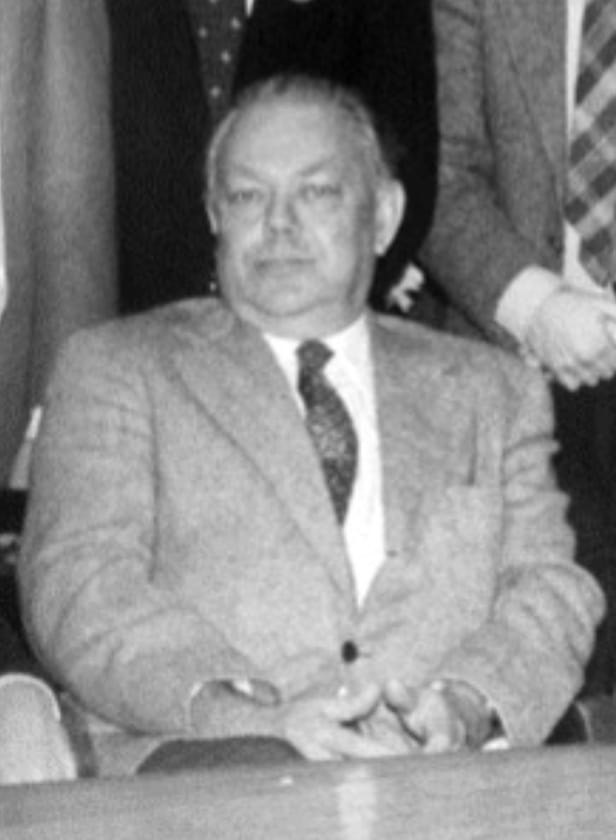
- Born: March 20, 1913; St Petersburg
- Died: June 3, 1988 (aged 75)

Alexandre Bennigsen (Russian: Александр Адамович Беннигсен) (20 March 1913 – 3 June 1988) was a scholar of Islam in the Soviet Union.

== Biography ==
Count Bennigsen was born in an aristocratic family in St Petersburg in 1913. After the Bolshevik Revolution, his family left Russia for Estonia in 1919 and settled in Paris in 1924, where he studied at the Ecole des Langues Orientales.

He taught at the Ecole des Hautes Etudes (en Sciences Sociales) and became the chair of history of non-Arab Islam. Bennigsen also taught at various American universities, including the University of Chicago and the University of Wisconsin–Madison.

Bennigsen believed that the Muslims of the Soviet Union effectively resisted Sovietization, maintaining a distinctive identity within the Union. He also attributed a political role to Islam, arguing that even though most Soviet Muslims probably knew little of actual Islamic religious practice they retained a strong cultural knowledge. The latter view was current among social scientists, who believed that Soviet social engineering had largely eradicated any sense of being Muslim amongst the historically Islamic people of the Russian empire. Bennigsen appeared prescient when the Soviet Union began to crumble, and especially in its aftermath. Events supported his belief that Soviet Muslims had retained their Islamic identity, though not a solid knowledge of Islamic practice, despite having been cut off from the larger Islamic world since the 1920s. However, his influence as a Cold War strategist influenced US covert activity in the area. Today Islam is a potent political force throughout the former Soviet republics but also, especially, in Russia itself.

Bennigsen influenced the Polish born American diplomat Zbigniew Brzezinski, when the latter set up the Nationalities Working Group as an interdepartmental organisation bringing together people from the CIA, the Pentagon and the State Department under the leadership of Paul B. Henze. The group advocated Bennigsen's view that the promotion of Islamism in Central Asia had potential in leading to a Muslim uprising against the Soviet authorities.

Bennigsen, who died in Paris in 1988, is generally considered the "father" of a school of students of nationality issues in the former Soviet Union and in the states formed in its aftermath. These included, prominently, S. Enders Wimbush and Chantal Lemercier-Quelquejay, with whom Bennigsen wrote many books and articles, and Paul A. Goble, the founder and editor of Window on Eurasia.

Marie Bennigsen-Broxup, his daughter, was a well-known scholar on Central Asia.

== Works ==
- The Evolution of the Muslim Nationalities in the USSR and their Linguistic Problems, London, 1961.
- Islam in the Soviet Union, London, New York, 1967.
- Muslim National Communism in the Soviet Union: a revolutionary strategy for the colonial world, Chicago, 1970, (coauthored with S. Enders Wimbush).
- Mystics and Commissars, Sufism in the Soviet Union, London & Berkeley, 1985, (coauthored with S. Enders Wimbush).
- Muslims of the Soviet Empire. A Guide, London & Bloomington, Ind., 1986, (coedited with S. Enders Wimbush).
- The Islamic Threat to the Soviet State, London, 1983. (With Marie Broxup).

== Sources ==
- Brief Russian biography
