= Marie Bennigsen-Broxup =

Marie Bennigsen-Broxup (1944 – 7 December 2012) was an expert on the Caucasus and Central Asia, with particular emphasis on Muslim communities within these regions. She pioneered an area studies focus on the former Soviet south, founding new research publications dedicated to these regions, and later becoming active in advocacy for the post-Soviet Chechen leadership in the 1990s.

== Biography ==
She was born in Paris in 1944, the daughter of the Russian émigré scholar of Islam, Alexandre Bennigsen. Following her marriage in 1973 to Michael Broxup, she lived in Hong Kong and Moscow, where she worked for the Financial Times, before returning to London in 1980.

Bennigsen joined the Society for Central Asian Studies in Oxford in 1981 and founded the London-based Central Asian Survey quarterly soon afterwards. She also edited Central Asia and Caucasus Chronicle from 1981 to 1990, and served as a consultant on Caucasian affairs to the French ministries of Defence and Foreign Affairs.

In 1983 Bennigsen published The Islamic Threat to the Soviet State, co-authored with her father. The Bennigsens' study hypothesised that unruly Muslim nationalities could come to constitute a major threat to the Soviet Union, a view achieving wide popularity among Sovietologists in the 1980s. It was in the North Caucasus, however, that this prediction would eventually ring truest, and in particular, in Chechnya. Bennigsen first travelled to Chechnya and neighbouring Dagestan in 1992, just after the Soviet collapse and as Chechnya was embarking on a path towards separation from Russia. She became a close associate of the Chechen leadership, engaging in international advocacy for their cause, as well as numerous charitable causes for relief to the population of Chechnya. In 1998–1999 Bennigsen conducted interviews with 20 Chechen field commanders and staff officers, including Aslan Maskhadov, the mastermind of the Chechen victory over Russian forces in the First Chechen war, later elected president of the republic in 1997 and assassinated by Russian special forces in 2005.

Bennigsen was married to Michael Broxup and the couple had two sons. Marie Bennigsen died in Oxford in December 2012 after a short illness.

== Main works ==
- The Islamic Threat to the Soviet State (Croom Helm, London, 1983 coauthored with Alexandre Bennigsen)
- The North Caucasus Barrier. The Russian Advance towards the Muslim World (Hurst & Co, London, 1992)
