= Brian Glyn Williams =

American academic

Brian Glyn Williams is a professor of Islamic History at the University of Massachusetts Dartmouth who worked for the CIA. As an undergraduate, he attended Stetson University, graduating with a Bachelor of Arts in 1988. He received his PhD in Middle Eastern and Islamic Central Asian History at the University of Wisconsin-Madison in 1999. An expert on history of the Middle East, he has written a number of books on Afghanistan, the war on terror and General Rashid Dostum. His articles have been published by the Jamestown Foundation. As an expert in the country, he teaches courses on Afghanistan at Umass Dartmouth.

== Books ==
- Williams, Brian Glyn (2001). The Crimean Tatars: The Diaspora Experience and the Forging of a Nation. Brill Academic Pub. ISBN 9004121226.
- Williams, Brian Glyn (2011). Afghanistan Declassified: A Guide to America's Longest War. University of Pennsylvania Press. ISBN 0812244036.
- Williams, Brian Glyn (July 2013). Predators: The CIA's Drone War on al Qaeda. Potomac Books Inc. ISBN 1612346170.
- Williams, Brian Glyn (September 2013). The Last Warlord: The Life and Legend of Dostum, the Afghan Warrior Who Led US Special Forces to Topple the Taliban Regime. Chicago Review Press. ISBN 1613748000.
- Williams, Brian Glyn (2015). Inferno in Chechnya: The Russian-Chechen Wars, the Al Qaeda Myth, and the Boston Marathon Bombings. ForeEdge. ISBN 978-1611687378.
