= Deportation of the Balkars =

Ethnic cleansing and genocide in the Soviet Union

- Part of Population transfer in the Soviet Union and World War II
- Location: Kabardino-Balkaria, North Caucasus
- Date: March 8, 1944
- Target: Expulsion and resettlement of the Balkars, population 37,103
- Attack type: Population transfer, ethnic cleansing, massacre
- Deaths: ~3,494 died in transit (8% of the population); ~from 1944-1952 estimated 7,600-11,000 died in total (20-25% of the population); ~18,000-24,000 died overall according to Balkars (50-65% of the population)
- Victim: 37,713 Balkars deported to forced settlements in the Soviet Union
- Perpetrators: NKVD, the Soviet secret police
- Motive: Russification, colonialism

The Soviet government forcibly transferred the entire Balkar population of the North Caucasus to Central Asia on March 8, 1944, during World War II. The expulsion was ordered by NKVD chief Lavrentiy Beria after approval by General Secretary Joseph Stalin. All the 37,713 Balkars of the Caucasus were deported from their homeland in one day. The crime was a part of a Soviet forced settlement program and population transfer that affected several million members of non-Russian Soviet ethnic minorities between the 1930s and the 1950s. Officially the deportation was a response to the Balkars' supposed collaboration with occupying German forces. Later, in 1989, the Soviet government declared the deportation illegal.

== Historical background ==
=== Background and ethnic tensions ===
Following an industrialization drive in Kabardino-Balkaria in 1928, ethnic tensions emerged between predominantly Russian industrial workers and Kabardians and Balkars, who were primarily employed in agriculture. During the early 1930s, Russian workers reacted negatively to affirmative action policies for local minorities. Tensions escalated at the construction site of the Baksan Hydroelectric Dam, where hostile relations and poor working conditions led many Kabardian and Balkar workers to leave after a few months.

Harassment against Balkar and Kabardian workers was also reported. Russian workers reportedly forced Balkar and Kabardian coworkers to consume pork or rubbed pork products on their lips. A 1932 article criticized the director of the Malka Machine and Tractor Station for failing to stop Russian workers from spreading pork lard on bread eaten by Kabardians. On March 7, 1937, Pravda reported an incident in the Kabardian village of Sarmakovo, where Russians and Romani residents had been expelled. The report stated that local authorities planned to deport all Russians from the Mountain district of Kabardino-Balkaria. The “Sarmakovo affair” subsequently triggered a state campaign against Kabardians and Balkars on charges of “Bourgeois Nationalism.”

=== World War II mobilization and desertion ===
The initial military mobilization of Kabardino-Balkaria saw over 3,500 Kabardians and Balkars volunteers join the 115th Kabardino-Balkar Cavalry Division. The unit was deployed to fight the German advance in the Don region before suffering severe losses in the Salsk Steppe in August 1942. Following the German advance that month, the 700 surviving members of the division left the front lines to return home seeking to avoid reassignment to other Red Army units and believing their military obligations were complete.

In August 1942 five districts of the Kabardino-Balkar Autonomous Soviet Socialist Republic (KBASSR) were occupied by German troops. Nalchik, capital of the KBASSR, was occupied on October 24, 1942. When the Soviet military forces withdrew they failed to remove or destroy local factories. Most agricultural resources were also untouched; for example 315,000 sheep, 455,000 cattle and 25,000 horses were left for the advancing Germans. Local authorities attempted to organize several partisan groups, but, as the families of the partisans were not evacuated, these groups fall apart. Only one unit, consisting of 125 people was effective.

The returning soldiers hid in the mountains, planning to do so until the end of the war, though a minority joined anti-Soviet resistance groups. Soviet authorities made little distinction between deserters and active insurgents, classifying both under the label of “bandits.” Following the German occupation of the region, many people were forced to relinquish their communist party membership and work in the occupation administration under threat of execution. During an obkom meeting in October 1942, Kumekhov claimed that there were 600 bandits in the Cherek Valley, though contemporary estimates place the actual number between 150–200. The majority were deserters; following a clash between these groups and Soviet forces, the NKVD initiated punitive operations in the area.

=== Cherek Valley massacre and aftermath ===
In response to Soviet military actions, the deserters adopted insurgent tactics, including an attack on the district executive committee. In an effort to subdue the insurgents, NKVD forces sealed off five villages, and took hostages to force a surrender. Concerns over the German advance prompted the NKVD to burn three villages and execute 1,500 residents, predominantly women, children, and elderly men. In response, insurgents killed seven soviet soldiers. Before withdrawing, the NKVD gatherd all the bodies in a building and set it on fire. The massacre had been ordered by the headquarters of the 37th Army to Lieutenant-Colonel Shikin, the commander of the 11th NKVD Security Division.

Following the operation, Shikin wrote to Captain Fedor Nakin, who had been sent to commit the massacre: “I approve of your actions, and the soldiers have performed outstandingly. If you cleanse Sredniaia Balkariia of the bastards who betrayed the motherland instead of defending it and became bandits, you will complete a mission of great importance.” however, Senior Lieutenant Seskov, sent to investigate the massacre, reported that the unit had executed many innocent civilians with no connections to the bandits. Seskov noted that in one village 20% of the victims were children aged 1 to 5, and an additional 15% were aged 6 to 10. The massacre and subsequent “retaliatory” actions, led many Balkars to oppose the USSR and collaborate with German occupation.

In early 1943 the KBASSR was liberated by the Soviet Army. Nalchik was liberated by troops of the 37th army together with local partisans. Despite this, according to Soviet reports in May 1943 there were 44 groups of anti-Soviet rebels, 941 people, on KBASSR territory; these included former Communist Party members.

In January 1943, 3,000 people residents of Kabardino-Balkaria retreated westward with the Germans, in hopes of evading punishment for collaboration.

== Causes of deportation ==
=== Stalinism ===
It is believed that the reason for the deportation of the Balkars, in a broad sense, was the Stalinist system, which depended on the repression of the Soviet people. More specifically Kabarda and Balkaria had acquired a reputation for political unreliability during the repressions of the 1920-30s. During this period, from a Kabardino-Balkarian population of 359,236, 17,000 were arrested for political reasons, 9,547 of them were tried, and 2,184 shot. Repression continued during the prewar and war years. Many notable people were arrested and sentenced: H. Appaev — Chairman of the Chegemsky district Executive Committee, Deputy of the Supreme Soviet of the RSFSR; S. Chumakov — head of the CPSU, A. Mokaev — Chairman of the Presidium of the Supreme Soviet of the KBASSR; A. Nastev — Chairman of the Elbrus District Administration, Deputy of the Supreme Soviet of the USSR. All of them were rehabilitated in the 1950s and 1960s.

=== Accusations of betrayal ===
Head of the NKVD Beria saw only "a small contribution" from the Balkar people in the fight against the Nazis, and even a "betrayal" amounting to a "failure to protect Balkar Republic, Elbrus". Z. D. Kumekhov, an ethnic Kabardinian and First Secretary of Communist Party's Local Committee, sent "a report with descriptions of the current situation in Balkar's areas of the KBASSR". It is believed that it was prepared for him by the NKVD. The paper contained detailed descriptions of the activities of gangs in the KBASSR including collaboration with German troops. Supposedly assisting the Soviet Army, many groups attacked local civilians and farmers. The NKVD reported that there were 1,737 people in these gangs. Kumekhov's report ended with the words "Based on the above, we find it necessary to resolve the issue of the possibility of resettlement of the Balkars outside the KBASSR."

In a top-secret telegram to Stalin, Beria described the necessity of deportation is proved as follows:

...in 1942, anti-Soviet elements in Balkaria carried out significant operations in the rear of the Red Army, creating gang-rebel groups, using deserters from the Balkar people... In the Balkar districts part of the Communist Party leadership joined gangs. The German occupation was well received by the majority of the Balkar people.

According to P. M. Polyan deportations, including that of the Balkars, were not preventive actions, but "revenge" for real or imagined war crimes against the Soviet Union.

== Deportation ==
=== Official decisions and deportation orders ===
On February 23, 1944, local NKVD chief Konstantin Bziava, NKGB chief Filatov, and Kabardino-Balkar ASSR First Secretary Kumekhov, submitted a report to Lavrentiy Beria. The document cited events leading up to the Cherek Valley massacre along with statistics on local “banditry,” as evidence of Balkar collaboration, asserting that Balkars had welcomed German forces into the region. However, the report omitted violence committed against Balkars by Soviet forces prior to the German arrival. On February 24, Beria proposed the mass deportation of Balkars to Stalin, and by February 26, issued formal NKVD orders for the expulsion of Balkars from the Kabardino-Balkar ASSR.

Lavrentiy Beria arrived in Nalchik on 2 March 1944. In the early morning of March 8, 1944, two days earlier than planned, Balkar's population was ordered to get ready to leave their homes. The entire operation lasted about two hours. The entire Balkar population was evicted without exception. 17,000 NKVD troops and 4,000 local agents participated in this operation.

Following a visit to Nalchik, Beria informed Kumekhov of his plans to deport the Balkar population, framing the land transfer as necessary to create a defensive perimeter for the Georgian SSR along the Northern slopes of the Caucasus. He promised that Kabardians would be compensated with lands previously occupied by Karachays, and Circassians.

By 9 March, 37,713 Balkars were deported in 14 train convoys. They arrived at their destinations in the Kazakh and Kyrgyz Soviet Socialist Republic by 23 March. After the end of World War II, Karachay and Balkar officers of the Red Army were discharged and later also deported. Official Soviet documents reveal that 562 people died during the deportation.

On April 8, 1944, the Supreme Soviet of the USSR issued a decree outlining the official rationale for the deportation of the Balkars:

In connection with the fact that, during the period of occupation of the territory of the Kabardino-Balkar ASSR by the Germano-fascist invaders, many Balkars betrayed their motherland, entered into armed detachments organized by the Germans, conducted diversionary actions against Red Army divisions, helped the fascist occupiers in the capacity of guides on the Caucasian passes, and, after the expulsion of the enemies armies from the territory of the Caucasus by the Red Army, entered into German-Organized bands for the struggle against Soviet Power.

=== Kabardian and Russian reactions ===
The deportation of the Balkar population elicited widespread distress and confusion among Kabardians due to close personal, familial, and economic ties between the two ethnicities. While opportunistic looting occurred in some Balkar villages, many Kabardians attempted to assist deportees by offering food and provisions as they were being removed. Balkar deportee Siuttun Atakuev recalled the scene in the Kabardian village of Nartan:

Balkar families arrived one after another. They were mostly elderly and women with their children. The residents of Nartan tried to give them some extra provisions, but the soldiers pushed them back, hitting them with rifle butts. The noise was unimaginable. Everyone was screaming, crying, trying to find their relatives in the crowd.

While local Kabardian and Russian officials could not openly oppose the deportation of Balkars, many expressed dismay over its severe economic impact as well as the disruption of interethnic relations. Local leaders criticized Kumekhov for failing to mitigate the underlying conditions that led to the expulsion. Following the deportation, local populations were not interested in settling the former Balkar area, only 4 of 33 emptied villages were reoccupied. Despite government incentives, Kabardians were reluctant to resettle in Balkar villages, as most Kabardians anticipated the exile would be temporary and expected the Balkar population to return to their former villages.

Following the deportation, the republic was renamed the Kabardian ASSR. Approximately 2,000 km of its original 12,500 km southwestern territory was given to the Georgian SSR. Kabardians who had been mistakenly deported alongside Balkar families were repatriated. In May, an additional 40 Balkar families residing in Georgia’s Klukhori district were exiled. Between May and June, Soviet authorities deported 1,672 Kabardian families to Kazakhstan on individual charges of wartime collaboration, though no blanket deportation was enacted against Kabardians as a whole.

=== Aftermath ===
Immediately prior to the deportation, the Balkar population stood at 38,300. In transit to Central Asia, 307 Balkars died, and within nine months, the population had fallen to 33,000. The population continued to decline until reaching a low of 31,700 in 1948; only after 1949 did the birth rate exceed the mortality rate.

As special settlers, Balkars could not travel more than 3 km beyond their designated settlement. Because schools in special settler villages generally offered education only through the primary level, schooling beyond the fourth grade was generally inaccessible. Directives issued to NKVD offices outlined restrictions on the treatment of special settlers, specifying that they could not join the Communist Party, enroll in higher education, be employed in skilled labor, be promoted to positions of authority, engage in political agitation, receive medals or awards, hold initiatives, or be conscripted into the Red Army.

The deportation prevented Balkars from receiving education in their native language, and their history and culture were officially suppressed. Balkar material culture suffered severe damage, with heirlooms, traditional costumes, and historical weaponry lost or destroyed during and after the exile. Furthermore, high mortality rates among the elderly and the separation of families across disparate settlements disrupted the transmission of oral traditions, folklore, and customs.

Many more died during the harsh years in exile and in labor camps. In total, it is estimated that 7,600-11,000 Balkars died as a consequence of the deportation, amounting to 20-25% of their entire ethnic group.

== Remembrance and legacy ==
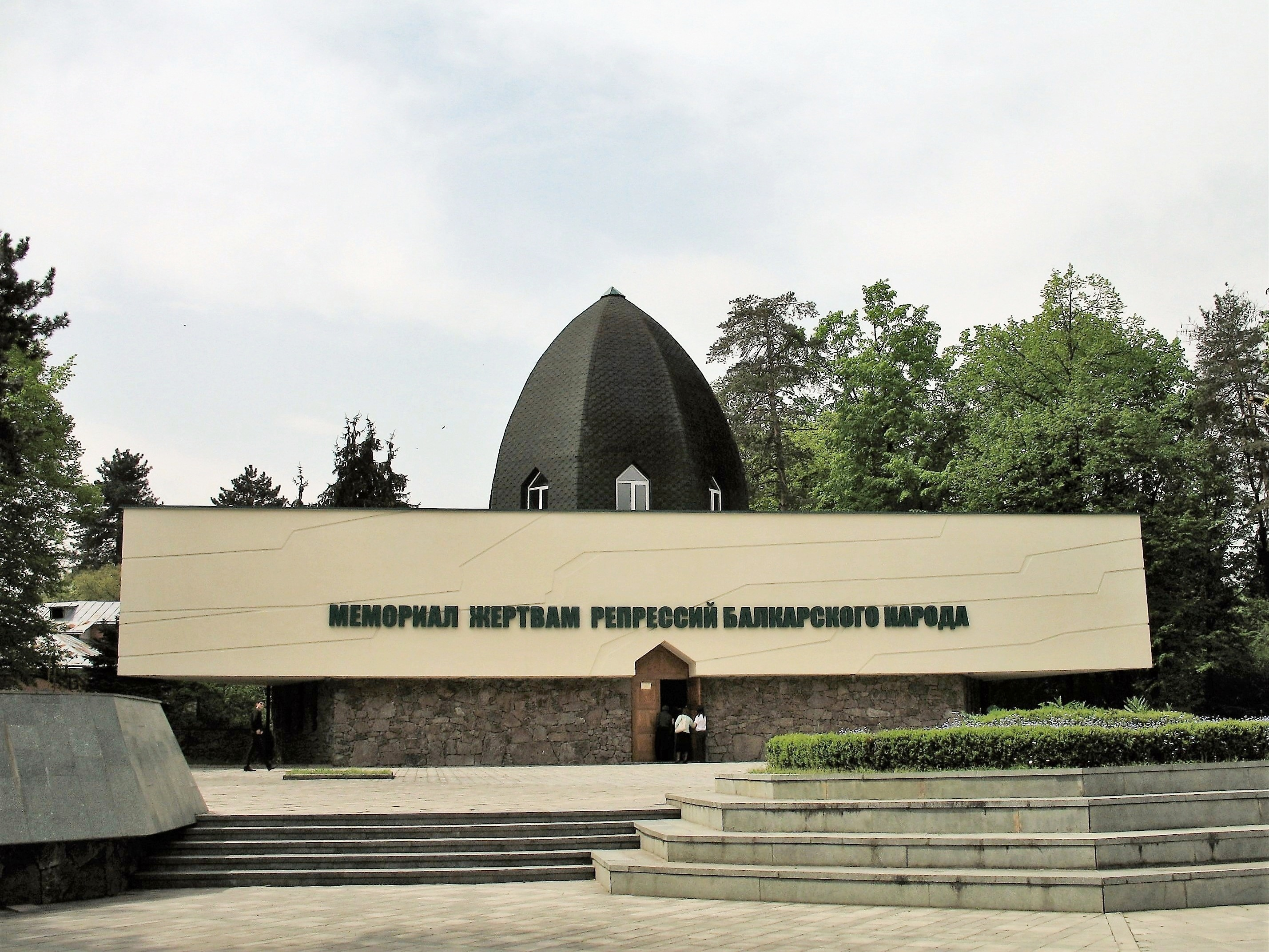
Victims of Deportation Memorial, Nalchik, KBR, Russia

Stalin's successor, Nikita Khrushchev, delivered a secret speech at the Party Congress on February 24, 1956, condemning these Stalinist deportations. Like the other rehabilitated people, the Balkars were then allowed to return from exile to their homeland. They found their homes and farms pillaged and in ruins. While 64 million roubles were allocated to assist the Balkars in rebuilding their housing, they were never given full financial compensation for their lost property or suffering in exile.

The 1959 Soviet census counted 42,408 Balkars. This is a population 10,000 below what was expected before the deportation. Some Balkars maintain that their status of autonomy is still not resolved.

== See also ==
- Deportation of the Chechens and Ingush
- Deportation of the Meskhetian Turks
- Deportation of the Crimean Tatars
- Deportation of the Kalmyks
- Deportation of the Karachays
- Deportation of the Koreans

== Sources ==
- Buckley, Cynthia J.; Ruble, Blair A.; Hofmann, Erin Trouth (2008). Migration, Homeland, and Belonging in Eurasia. Woodrow Wilson Center Press. p. 207. ISBN 978-0801890758. LCCN 2008-015571.
- Richmond, Walter (2008). The Northwest Caucasus: Past, Present, Future. Routledge. p. 117. ISBN 9780415776158. LCCN 2008001048.
- Human Rights Watch (1991). "Punished Peoples" of the Soviet Union: The Continuing Legacy of Stalin's Deportations" (PDF).
