= Forced settlement =

Forced settlement may refer to:

- Sedentarization
- Forced settlements in the Soviet Union, punitive settlements, a tool of Soviet political repression
