= Population transfer in the Soviet Union =

Transfer and deportation of people in the Soviet Union

- Part of the dekulakization, the forced settlements in the Soviet Union, and World War II
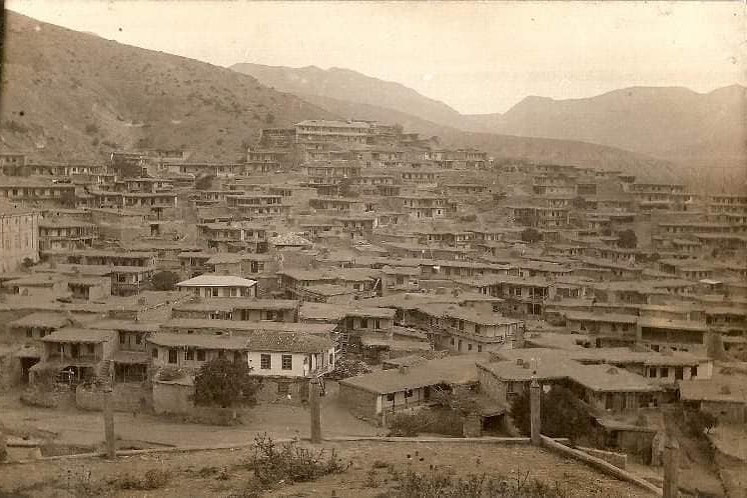
- The empty Crimean Tatar village of Üsküt, near Alushta. Photo taken in 1945 after the complete deportation of its inhabitants

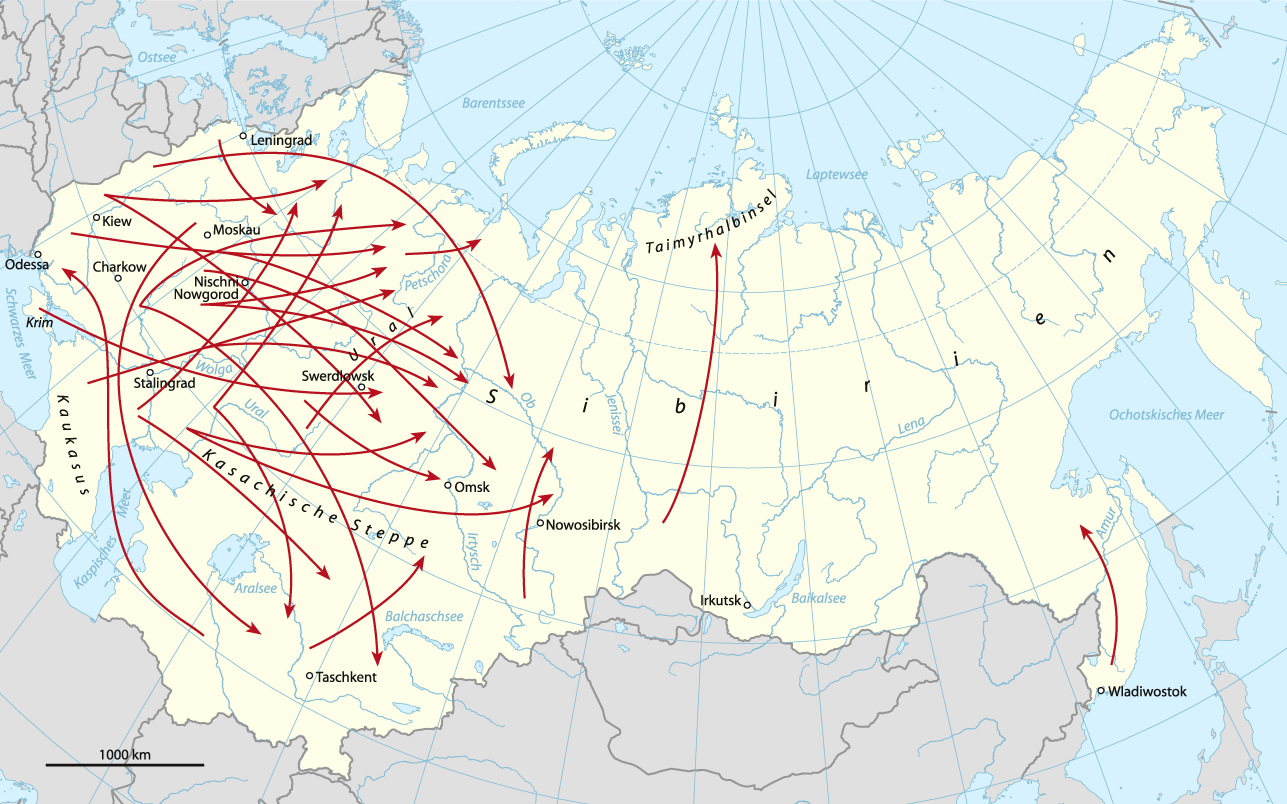
- General routes of deportation during the dekulakization across the Soviet Union in 1930–1931
- Location: Soviet Union and occupied territories
- Date: 1930–1952
- Target: Kulaks (well-off peasants), ethnic minorities, clergy, undesirable citizens of Soviet and occupied territories
- Attack type: Ethnic cleansing, population transfer, forced labor, genocide, classicide
- Deaths: ~800,000–1,500,000 in the USSR
- Victims: 6,000,000 Soviet citizens deported to forced settlements in the Soviet Union
- Perpetrator: OGPU / NKVD
- Motive: Sovietisation, colonialism, cheap labor for forced settlements in the Soviet Union Prometheism

From 1930 to 1952, the government of the Soviet Union, on the orders of Soviet leader Joseph Stalin and under the direction of the NKVD official Lavrentiy Beria, forcibly transferred populations of various groups. These actions may be classified into the following broad categories: deportations of "anti-Soviet" categories of population (often classified as "enemies of the people"), deportations of entire ethnic groups, labor force transfer, and organized migrations in opposite directions to fill ethnically cleansed territories. Dekulakization marked the first time that an entire class was deported, whereas the deportation of Soviet Koreans in 1937 marked the precedent of a specific ethnic deportation of an entire nationality.

In most cases, their destinations were underpopulated remote areas. It has been estimated that, in their entirety, internal forced migrations affected at least 6 million people. Of this total, 1.8 million kulaks were deported in 1930–31, 1.0 million peasants and ethnic minorities in 1932–1939, whereas about 3.5 million ethnic minorities were further resettled during 1940–52. The post-war demographic shifts included the largely voluntary repatriation of 4.2 million individuals displaced by the German occupation.

Soviet archives documented 390,000 deaths during kulak forced resettlement and up to 400,000 deaths of people deported to forced settlements during the 1940s; however, Nicolas Werth places overall deaths closer to some 1 to 1.5 million perishing as a result of the deportations. Contemporary historians classify these deportations as a crime against humanity and ethnic persecution. Two of these cases with the highest mortality rates have been described as genocides–the deportation of the Crimean Tatars was declared as genocide by Ukraine and several other countries, whereas the deportation of the Chechens and Ingush was declared as genocide by the European Parliament. On 26 April 1991, the Supreme Soviet of the Russian Socialist Federal Soviet Republic, under its chairman Boris Yeltsin, passed the law On the Rehabilitation of Repressed Peoples with Article 2 denouncing all mass deportations as "Stalin's policy of defamation and genocide."

The Soviet Union also practiced deportations in occupied territories, with over 50,000 perishing from the Baltic states and 300,000 to 360,000 perishing during the expulsion of Germans from Eastern Europe due to Soviet deportation, massacres, and internment and labour camps.

== Deportation of social groups ==
Many Soviet farmers, regardless of their actual income or property, were labeled "Kulaks" for resisting collectivization. This term historically referred to relatively affluent farmers since the later Russian Empire. Kulak was the most common category of deported Soviet citizen. Resettlement of people officially designated as kulaks continued until early 1950, including several major waves: on 5 September 1951 the Soviet government ordered the deportation of kulaks from the Lithuanian SSR for "hostile actions against kolhozes", which was one of the last resettlements of that social group.

Large numbers of "kulaks", regardless of their nationality, were resettled in Siberia and Central Asia. According to data from Soviet archives, which were published in 1990, 1,803,392 people were sent to labor colonies and camps in 1930 and 1931, and 1,317,022 reached the destination. Deportations on a smaller scale continued after 1931. The reported number of kulaks and their relatives who died in labour colonies from 1932 to 1940 was 389,521. The total number of the deported people is disputed. Conservative estimates assume that 1,679,528-1,803,392 people were deported, while the highest estimates are that 15 million kulaks and their families were deported by 1937, and that during the deportation many people died, but the full number is not known. In the late 1920s and 1930s, millions of Russians were deported to Kazakhstan, and they were referred to as special settlers, and from 1933, they were known as labor settlers. They were not prisoners of the Gulag. As a result, Karaganda and many other settlements in Kazakhstan were established. As of June 1, 1938, there were 100 labor settlements in the Kazakh Soviet Socialist Republic, where survivors of the dekulakization lived. In addition to other documents, for example, on May 8, 1931, the A. A. Andreev Commission issued a draft resolution on the possibility of settling 150,000 "kulak farms" in North-Eastern Kazakhstan. The descendants of these Russians still live throughout Kazakhstan today.

== Ethnic operations ==
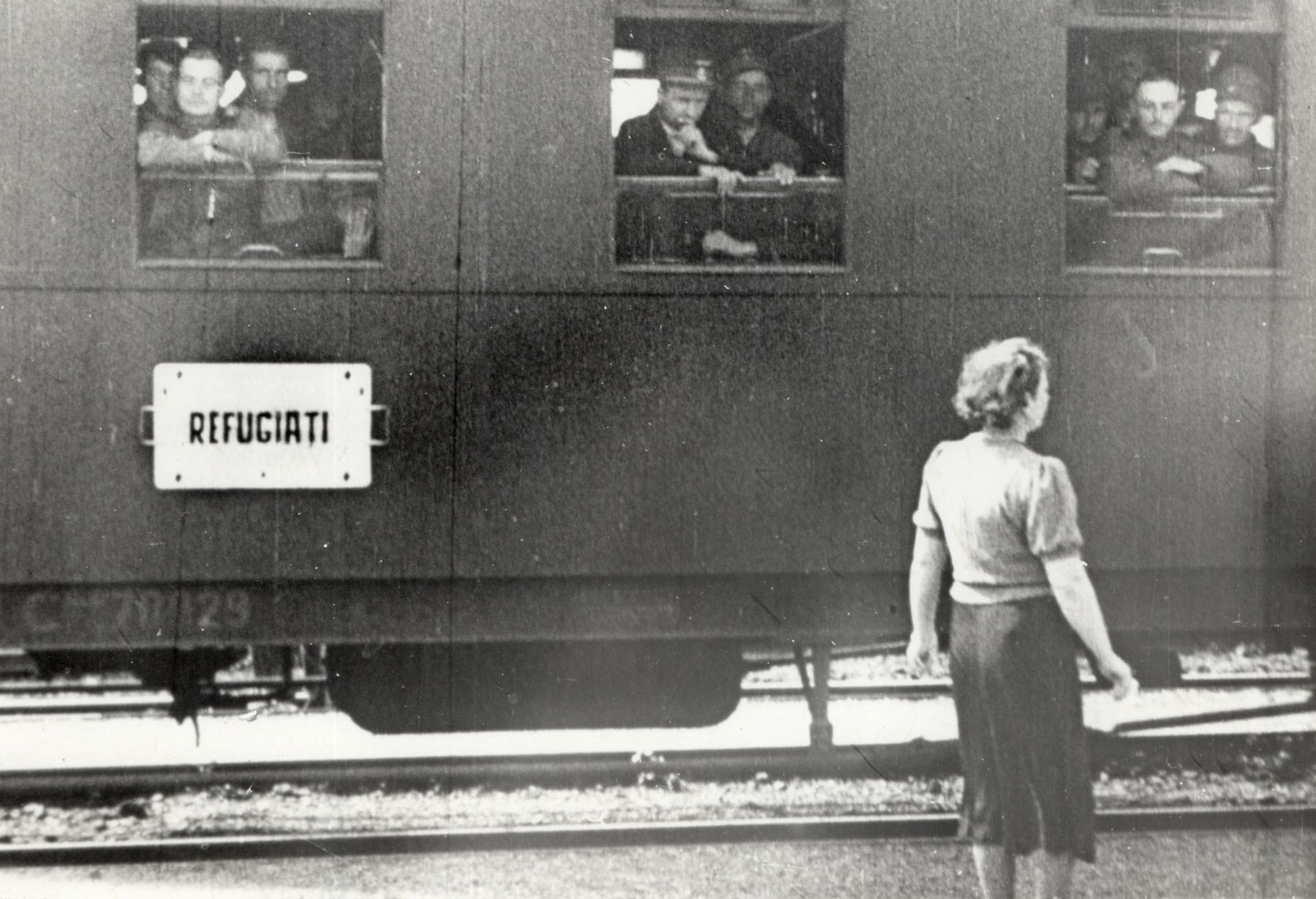
A train with Romanian refugees following the Soviet annexation of Bessarabia

During the 1930s, categorization of so-called enemies of the people shifted from the usual Marxist–Leninist, class-based terms, such as kulak, to ethnic-based ones. The partial removal of potentially trouble-making ethnic groups was a technique used consistently by Joseph Stalin during his government; between 1935 and 1938 alone, at least ten different nationalities were deported. Germany's invasion of the Soviet Union led to a massive escalation in Soviet ethnic cleansing.

The deportation of Koreans in the Soviet Union, originally conceived in 1926, initiated in 1930, and carried through in 1937, was the first mass transfer of an entire nationality in the Soviet Union. Almost the entire Soviet population of ethnic Koreans (171,781 people) were forcibly moved from the Russian Far East to unpopulated areas of the Kazakh SSR and the Uzbek SSR in October 1937.

Looking at the entire period of Stalin's rule, one can list: Ingrian Finns (1929–1931 and 1935–1939), Kalmyks, Balkars, Italians of Crimea, Karachays, Meskhetian Turks, Karapapakhs, and Far East Koreans (1937), Poles (1939–1941 and 1944–1945), Finnish people in Karelia (1940–1941, 1944), Kola Norwegians (1940–1942), Romanians (1941 and 1944–1953), Estonians, Latvians, and Lithuanians (1941 and 1945–1949), Volga Germans (1941–1945), Chechens, Ingush, Crimean Tatars and Crimean Greeks (1944), and Caucasus Greeks (1949–1950).

Shortly before, during and immediately after World War II, Stalin conducted a series of deportations on a huge scale which profoundly affected the ethnic map of the Soviet Union. It is estimated that between 1941 and 1949 nearly 3.3 million were deported to Siberia and the Central Asian republics.

=== Western annexations and deportations, 1939–1941 ===
Lavrentiy Beria, the Chief of the NKVD, the Soviet secret police, was responsible for organizing and executing numerous deportations of ethnic minorities during that time.

After the Soviet invasion of Poland following the corresponding German invasion that marked the start of World War II in 1939, the Soviet Union annexed the eastern parts of Poland (known as Kresy in Poland or known as West Belarus and West Ukraine in the USSR as well as in Belarus and Ukraine) of the Second Polish Republic, which then became the western parts of the Belarusian SSR and the Ukrainian SSR. From 1939–1941, 1.45 million people who inhabited the region were deported by the Soviet regime. According to Polish historians, 63.1% of these people were Poles and 7.4% of them were Jews. Previously, it was believed that about 1.0 million Polish citizens died at the hands of the Soviets, but recently, Polish historians, mostly based upon their study of Soviet archives, estimate that about 350,000 people who were deported from 1939–1945 died.

The same policy was implemented in the Baltic republics of Latvia, Lithuania and Estonia (see Soviet deportations from Estonia, Latvia and Lithuania). More than 200,000 people are estimated to have been deported from the Baltic in 1940–1953. In addition, at least 75,000 were sent to the Gulag. 10% of the entire adult Baltic population was deported or sent to labor camps. In 1989, native Latvians represented only 52% of the population of their own country. In Estonia, the figure was 62%. In Lithuania, the situation was better because the migrants sent to that country actually moved to the former area of Eastern Prussia (now Kaliningrad) which, contrary to the original plans, never became part of Lithuania.

Likewise, Romanians from Chernivtsi Oblast and Moldavia had been deported in great numbers which range from 200,000 to 400,000. (See Soviet deportations from Bessarabia.)

=== World War II, 1941–1945 ===
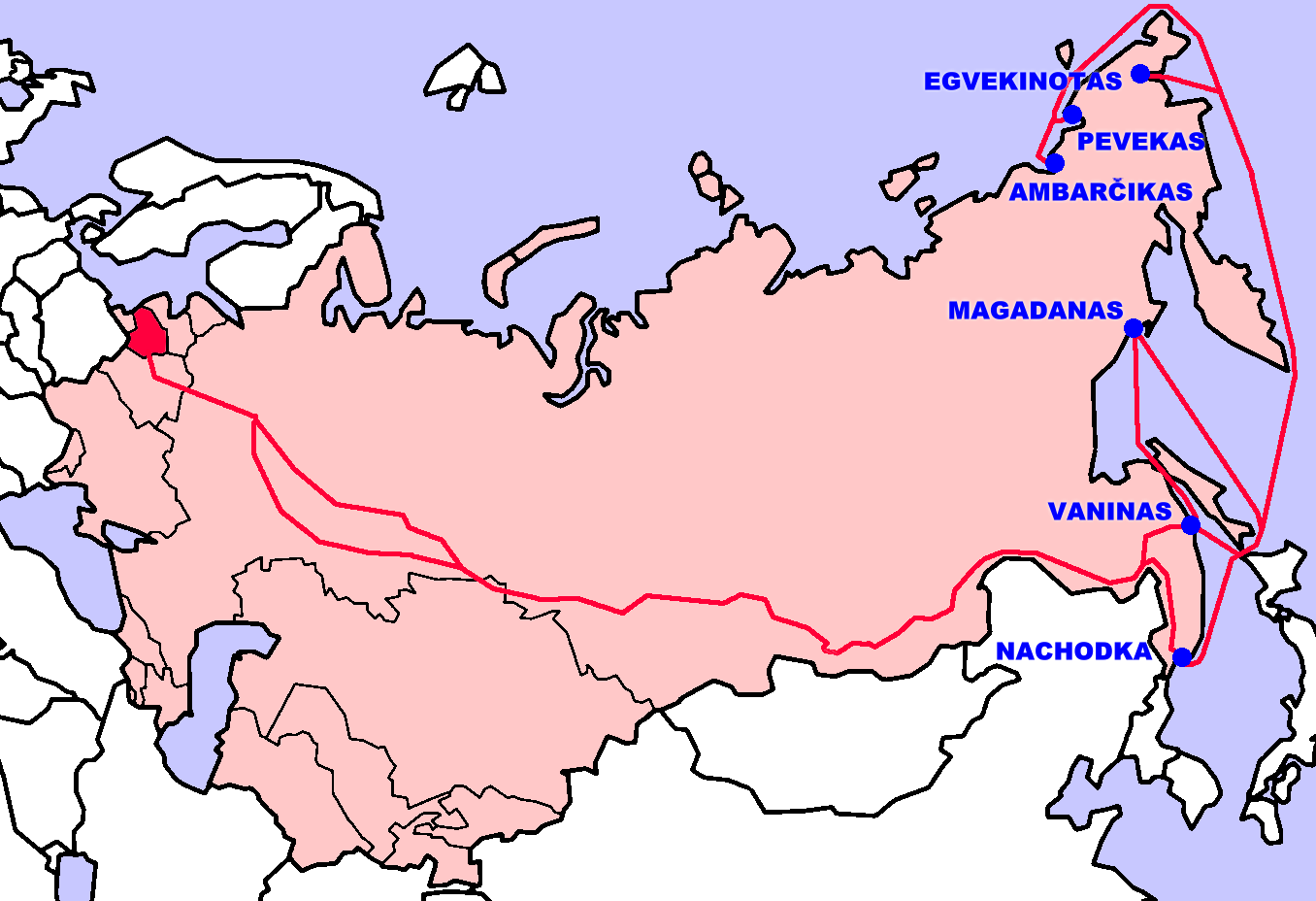
Route of people deported from Lithuania to remote regions of the Far East, up to 6,000 miles (9,700 km) away

During World War II, particularly in 1943–44, the Soviet government conducted a series of deportations. Some 1.9 million people were deported to Siberia and the Central Asian republics. According to the Soviets, of approximately 183,000 Crimean Tatars, 20,000 or 10% of the entire population served in German battalions, though the figure in question is derived from a single SS report on how many individuals were expected to be willing to collaborate and is contradicted by official statistical records, which suggest the number was actually around 3,000, with only 800 being volunteers. Consequently, Tatars too were transferred en masse by the Soviets after the war. Vyacheslav Molotov justified this decision saying "The fact is that during the war we received reports about mass treason. Battalions of Caucasians opposed us at the fronts and attacked us from the rear. It was a matter of life and death; there was no time to investigate the details. Of course innocents suffered. But I hold that given the circumstances, we acted correctly." Historian Ian Grey writes "Towards the Moslem peoples, the Germans pursued a benign, almost paternalistic policy. The Karachays, Balkars, Ingush, Chechens, Kalmucks, and Tatars of the Crimea all displayed pro-German sympathies in some degree. It was only the hurried withdrawal of the Germans from the Caucasus after the battle of Stalingrad that prevented their organizing the Moslem people for effective anti-Soviet action. The Germans boasted loudly, however, that they had left a strong "fifth column" behind them in the Caucasus."

Volga Germans and seven (non-Slavic) nationalities of the Crimea and the northern Caucasus were deported: the Crimean Tatars, Kalmyks, Chechens, Ingush, Balkars, Karachays, and Meskhetian Turks. All Crimean Tatars were deported en masse, in a form of collective punishment, on 18 May 1944 as special settlers to Uzbekistan and other distant parts of the Soviet Union. According to NKVD data, nearly 20% died in exile during the following year and a half. Crimean Tatar activists have reported this figure to be nearly 46%. (See Deportation of Crimean Tatars.)

Other minorities evicted from the Black Sea coastal region included Bulgarians, Crimean Greeks, Romanians and Armenians.

The Soviet Union also deported people from occupied territories such as the Baltic states, Poland, and territories occupied by Germans. A study published by the German government in 1974 estimated the number of German civilian victims of crimes during expulsion of Germans after World War II between 1945 and 1948 to be over 600,000, with about 400,000 deaths in the areas east of the Oder and Neisse (ca. 120,000 in acts of direct violence, mostly by Soviet troops but also by Poles, 60,000 in Polish and 40,000 in Soviet concentration camps or prisons mostly from hunger and disease, and 200,000 deaths among civilian deportees to forced labor of Germans in the Soviet Union), 130,000 in Czechoslovakia (thereof 100,000 in camps), and 80,000 in Yugoslavia (thereof 15,000 to 20,000 from violence outside of and in camps and 59,000 deaths from hunger and disease in camps).

By January 1953, there were 988,373 special settlers residing in the Kazakh Soviet Socialist Republic, including 444,005 Germans, 244,674 Chechens, 95,241 Koreans, 80,844 Ingush, and the others. As a consequence of these deportations, Kazakhs comprised only 30% of their native Republic's population.

== Post-war expulsion and deportation ==
After World War II, the German population of the Kaliningrad Oblast, formerly East Prussia, was expelled and the depopulated area resettled by Soviet citizens, mainly by Russians. Between 1944 and 1953, a variety of groups from the Black Sea region — Kurds, Iranians, Greeks, Bulgarians, Armenians, and Hemshins were deported away from the Soviet border regions in Crimea and the Transcaucasus.

Poland and Soviet Ukraine conducted population exchanges; Poles who resided east of the established Poland–Soviet border were deported to Poland (c.a. 2,100,000 people) and Ukrainians that resided west of the established Poland-Soviet Union border were deported to Soviet Ukraine. Population transfer to Soviet Ukraine occurred from September 1944 to April 1946 (ca. 450,000 people). Some Ukrainians (ca. 200,000 people) left southeast Poland more or less voluntarily (between 1944 and 1945).

== Labor force transfer ==
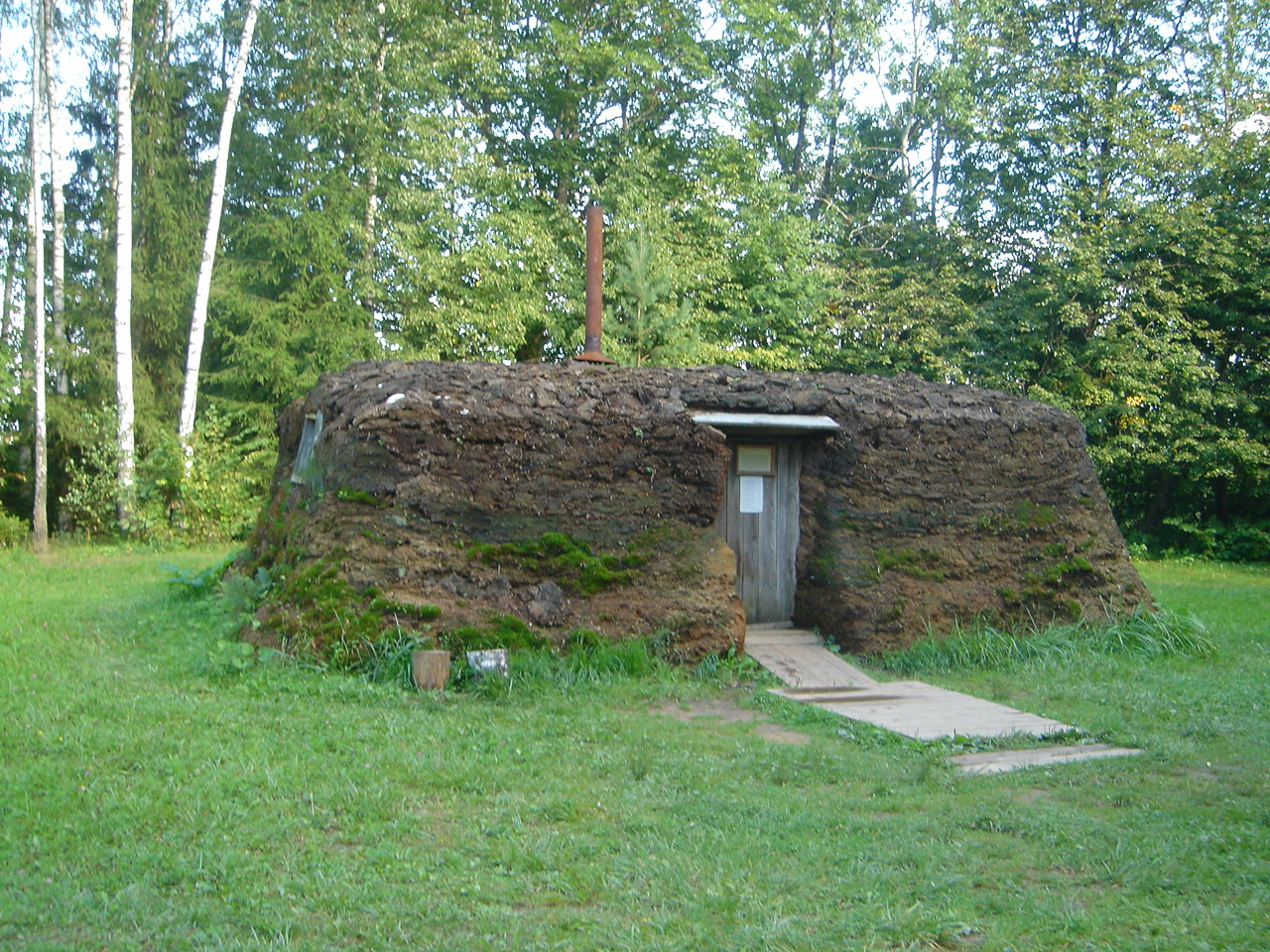
A dwelling typical to some deportees into Siberia in a museum in Rumšiškės, Lithuania

There were several notable campaigns of targeted non-penal workforce transfer.

- Twenty-five-thousanders
- NKVD labor columns
- Virgin Lands campaign
- Baku oil industry workers transfer: during the German-Soviet War, in October 1942, about 10,000 workers from the petroleum sites of Baku, together with their families, were transferred to several sites with potential oil production (the "Second Baku" area (Volga-Ural oil field), Kazakhstan and Sakhalin), in face of the potential German threat, although Germany failed to seize Baku.
- Khetagurovite Campaign

== Repatriation after World War II ==
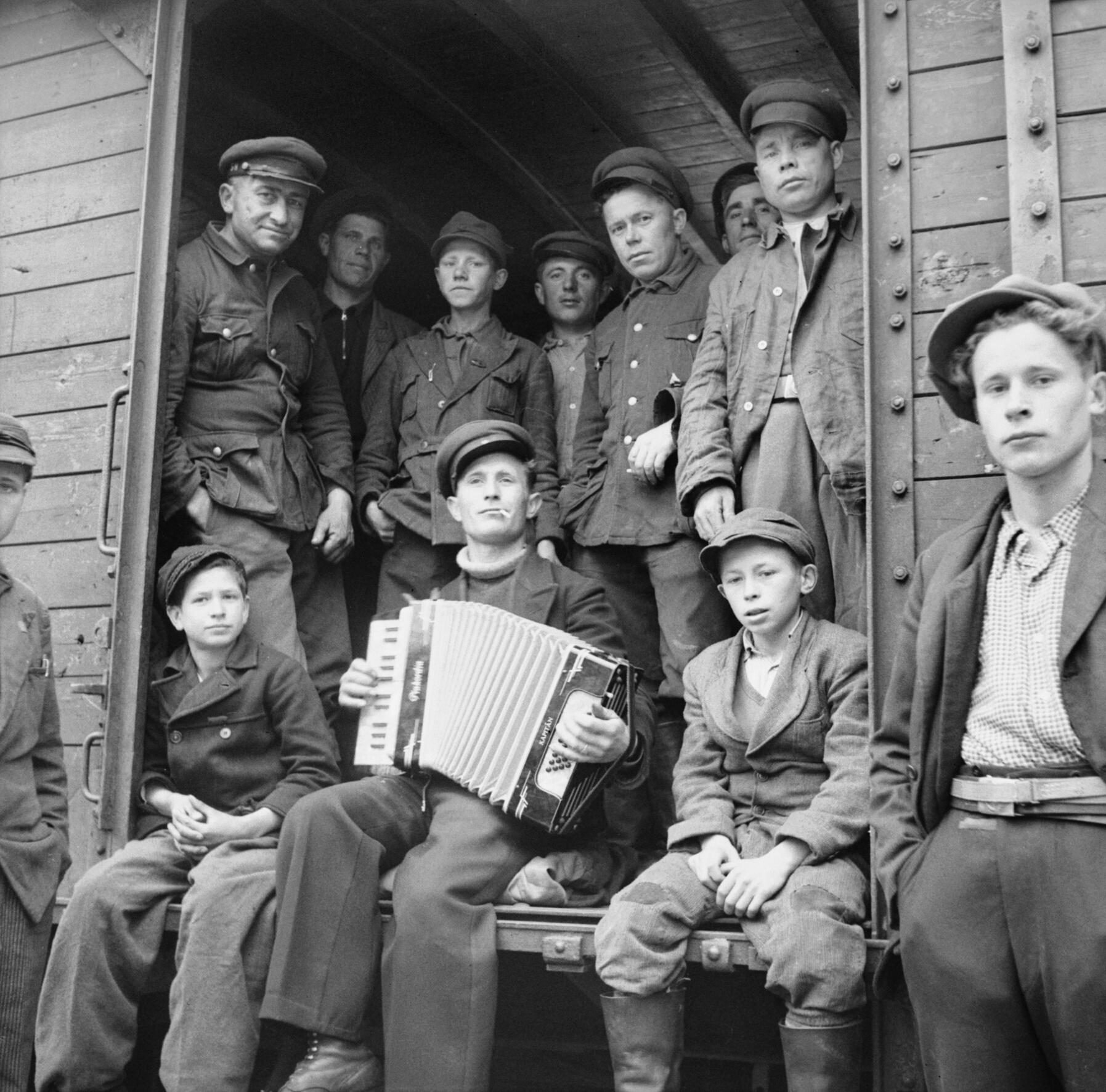
The departure of a train echelon carrying former prisoners of war and Ostarbeiters from a transit camp near Hamburg. May 31, 1945

Repatriation of Soviet citizens was an inter-governmental population transfer program undertaken by Soviet, British, American, and other Allied forces to resettle citizens of the USSR who were located in territories under Allied control. Amounting to 4.2 million people, these included Ostarbeiters, collaborationists, prisoners of war, and refugees. The Allies of World War II agreed to mandatory repatriation at the Yalta Conference in February 1945. The bulk of handovers occurred from May to October 1945.

About 80 percent of displaced persons from pre-1939 Soviet borders returned voluntarily. Western Allies initially used force to transfer those who resisted repatriation, primarily collaborators, but later shifted toward a voluntary policy. Notable instances of forced repatriation were the British handover of Cossack collaborators in May and June of 1945 and the late stage Operation Keelhaul of 1946 and 1947, a targeted Allied dragnet aimed at flushing out remaining military collaborators.

Declassified archives disprove claims of universal, immediate persecution for the returnees. The state cleared and sent home 58 percent of the population. Another 33.5 percent faced mobilization into the military or construction battalions, effectively forced labor. Only 6.5 percent entered NKVD special camps as security risks. The state sent rank-and-file military collaborators to special settlements for six years and prosecuted officers and civilian collaborators in positions of authority.

Civilian returnees endured extortion and sexual violence at filtration points. Local authorities, suspicious neighbors, and employers dominated their post-return lives. Officials assigned civilians to heavy labor and blocked access to advancement, which especially affected urban population. Former POWs faced systemic suspicion and were not accorded the status of veterans unless they had fought in the army after liberation. To avoid permanent stigma, returnees hid their pasts; women married and changed their names. Few of the returnees spoke openly about their experiences.

== State rehabilitation ==
=== In the USSR ===
On 17 January 1956, a Decree of the Presidium of the Supreme Soviet was issued on lifting restrictions on the Poles evicted in 1936; on 17 March 1956 for the Kalmyks; 27 March for the Greeks, Bulgarians, and Armenians; 18 April for the Crimean Tatars, Balkars, Meskhetian Turks, Kurds, and Hemshins; 16 July for the Chechens, Ingush, and Karachais (all without the right to return to their homeland).

In February 1956, Nikita Khrushchev, in his speech "On the Cult of Personality and Its Consequences", condemned the deportations as a violation of Leninist principles:

All the more monstrous are the acts whose initiator was Stalin and which are violations of the basic Leninist principles of the national policy of the Soviet state. We refer to the mass deportations from their native places of whole nations... This deportation action was not dictated by any military considerations. Thus, already at the end of 1943, when there occurred a permanent breakthrough at the fronts... a decision was taken and executed concerning the deportation of all the Karachay from the lands on which they lived. In the same period, at the end of December 1943, the same lot befell whole population of the Autonomous Kalmyk Republic. In March all the Chechen and Ingush peoples were deported and the Chechen-Ingush Autonomous Republic was liquidated. In April 1944, all Balkars were deported to faraway places from the territory of the Kalbino-Balkar Autonomous Republic and the Republic itself was renamed the Autonomous Kabardin Republic.

In 1957 and 1958, the national autonomies of Kalmyks, Chechens, Ingush, Karachais, and Balkars were restored; these peoples were allowed to return to their historical territories. The return of repressed peoples was not carried out without difficulties, which both then and subsequently led to national conflicts (thus, clashes began between returning Chechens and the Russians who settled during their exile in the Grozny Oblast; Ingush in the Prigorodny District, populated by Ossetians and transferred to the North Ossetian Autonomous Soviet Socialist Republic).

However, a significant number of the repressed peoples (Volga Germans, Crimean Tatars, Meskhetian Turks, Greeks, Koreans, etc.) had still received neither national autonomy nor the right to return to their historical homeland.

On 29 August 1964, 23 years after the start of the deportation, the Presidium of the Supreme Soviet of the USSR, by its Decree of 29 August 1964 No. 2820-VI, abolished sweeping accusations against the German population living in the Volga region. A decree that completely lifted restrictions on freedom of movement and confirmed the right of Germans to return to the places they were expelled was adopted in 1972.

In the mid-1960s, the process of rehabilitation of the "punished peoples" was almost stopped.

According to a secret Soviet Ministry of Interior report dated December 1965, for the period 1940–1953, 46,000 people were deported from Moldova, 61,000 from Belarus, 571,000 from Ukraine, 119,000 from Lithuania, 53,000 from Latvia, and 33,000 from Estonia.

=== During perestroika ===
During perestroika, a step towards the restoration of historic justice in relation to the repressed peoples was the Declaration of the Supreme Soviet of the USSR on 14 November 1989 "On recognizing repressive acts against peoples subjected to forced resettlement to be illegal and criminal and ensuring these peoples' rights". (Note: s:ru:Декларация ВС СССР от 14.11.1989 № 772-I "О признании незаконными и преступными репрессивных актов против народов, подвергшихся насильственному переселению, и обеспечении их прав")

=== In post-Soviet Russia ===
On 26 April 1991, the RSFSR Law No. 1107-I "On the rehabilitation of repressed peoples" was adopted, which recognized the deportation of peoples as a "policy of slander and genocide" (Article 2). Among other things, the law recognized the right of repressed peoples to restore the territorial integrity that existed before the unconstitutional policy of forcibly redrawing borders, to restore national-state formations that existed before their abolition, and to compensate for damage caused by the state.

Mukharbek Didigov called this law a triumph of historical justice. In his opinion, the fact that the state recognizes repression as illegal, inhumane actions directed against innocent people is an indicator of the development of democratic institutions, which has a special moral significance for deported peoples. According to him, the law gives confidence that this will not happen again.

In furtherance of the law "On the rehabilitation of repressed peoples", several legislative acts were adopted, including the resolution of the Supreme Court of the Russian Federation of 16 July 1992 "On the rehabilitation of the Cossacks"; the Resolution of the Supreme Court of the Russian Federation of 1 April 1993 "On the rehabilitation of Russian Koreans"; the Decree of the Government of the Russian Federation of 24 January 1992 "On priority measures for the practical restoration of the legal rights of the repressed peoples of the Dagestan Autonomous Soviet Socialist Republic"; the Resolution of the Supreme Court of the Russian Federation of 29 June 1993 "On the rehabilitation of Russian Finns", etc.

15 years after recognition in the USSR, in February 2004, the European Parliament also recognized the deportation of Chechens and Ingush in 1944 as an act of genocide.

On 24 September 2012, deputies from United Russia introduced a bill on additional assistance to representatives of repressed peoples to the State Duma. The bill's authors proposed allocating 23 billion rubles from the federal budget to help political prisoners. According to the authors, this money should be used for monthly payments and compensation for lost property in the amount of up to 35 thousand rubles.

== Modern views ==
Several historians, including Russian historian Pavel Polian and Lithuanian Associate Research Scholar at Yale University Violeta Davoliūtė consider these mass deportations of civilians a crime against humanity. They are also often described as Soviet ethnic cleansing. Terry Martin of Harvard University writes that "the same principles that informed Soviet nation building could and did lead to ethnic cleansing and ethnic terror against a limited set of stigmatized nationalities, while leaving nation-building policies in place for the majority of nonstigmatized nationalities".

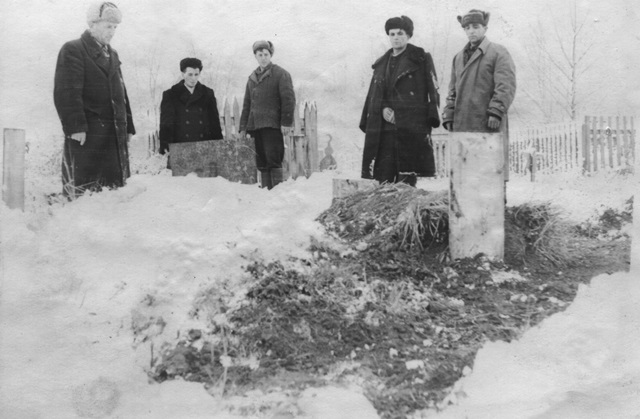
Funeral of the deported Crimean Tatars in Krasnovishersk, late 1944

Other academics and countries go further to call the deportations of the Crimean Tatars, Chechens and Ingushs genocide. Raphael Lemkin, a lawyer of Polish-Jewish descent who coined the term genocide himself, assumed that genocide was perpetrated in the context of the mass deportation of the Chechens, Ingush, Volga Germans, Crimean Tatars, Kalmyks, and Karachays. (Note: Professor Lyman H. Legters argued that the Soviet penal system, combined with its resettlement policies, should count as genocidal since the sentences were borne most heavily specifically on certain ethnic groups, and that a relocation of these ethnic groups, whose survival depended on ties to their particular homeland, "had a genocidal effect remediable only by restoration of the group to its homeland". Soviet dissidents Ilya Gabay and Pyotr Grigorenko both classified the population transfers of the Crimean Tatars as genocide. Historian Timothy Snyder included it in a list of Soviet policies that "meet the standard of genocide". French historian and expert on communist studies Nicolas Werth, German historian Philipp Ther, Professor Anthony James Joes, American journalist Eric Margolis, Canadian political scientist Adam Jones, professor of Islamic history at the University of Massachusetts Dartmouth Brian Glyn Williams, scholars Michael Fredholm and Fanny E. Bryan also considered the population transfers of the Chechens and Ingush as the crime of genocide. German investigative journalist Lutz Kleveman compared the deportations of Chechens and Ingush to a "slow genocide".) The deportation of Crimean Tatars is recognized as genocide by the parliaments of Ukraine, Latvia, Lithuania, and Canada. The European Parliament recognized the deportation of Chechens and Ingush as a crime of genocide in 2004. The separatist government of Chechnya also recognized it as genocide.

Some academics disagree with the classification of deportation as genocide. Professor Alexander Statiev argues that Stalin's administration did not have a conscious genocidal intent to exterminate the various deported peoples, but that Soviet "political culture, poor planning, haste, and wartime shortages were responsible for the genocidal death rate among them." He rather considers these deportations an example of Soviet assimilation of "unwanted nations." According to Professor Amir Weiner, "...It was their territorial identity and not their physical existence or even their distinct ethnic identity that the regime sought to eradicate." According to Professor Francine Hirsch, "although the Soviet regime practiced politics of discrimination and exclusion, it did not practice what contemporaries thought of as racial politics." To her, these mass deportations were based on the concept that nationalities were "sociohistorical groups with a shared consciousness and not racial-biological groups". In contrast to this view, Jon K. Chang contends that the deportations had been in fact based on ethnicity and that "social historians" in the West have failed to champion the rights of marginalized ethnicities in the Soviet Union.

=== Possible motivations ===
Harvard's Terry Martin suggested a concept of "Soviet xenophobia", which he defines as the ideologically motivated "exaggerated Soviet fear of foreign influence and foreign contamination". This theory espouses the belief that the Soviet Union ethnically cleansed the border peoples of the USSR from 1937 to 1951 (including the Caucasus and the Crimea) to remove Soviet nationalities whose political allegiances were allegedly suspect or inimical to Soviet socialism. In this view, the USSR did not practice direct negative ethnic animus or discrimination ("In neither case did the Soviet state itself conceive of these deportations as ethnic.") Political ideology of all Soviet peoples was the primary consideration. Martin stated that the various deportations of the Soviet border peoples were simply the "culmination of a gradual shift from predominantly class-based terror", which began during collectivization (1932–1933), to "national/ethnic" based terror (1937). Accordingly, Martin further claimed that the nationalities deportations were "ideological, not ethnic. It was spurred by an ideological hatred and suspicion of foreign capitalist governments, not the national hatred of non-Russians." His theory entitled "Soviet xenophobia" paints the USSR and the Stalinist regime as having practiced and carried out in politics, education and Soviet society relatively pure socialism and Marxist practices. This view has been supported by many of the major historians of the USSR, those in Russian and even Korean studies such as Fitzpatrick, Suny, F. Hirsch, A. Weiner, and A. Park. A. Park, in her archival work, found very little evidence that Koreans had proven or were able to prove their loyalties beyond a shadow of a doubt, thus 'necessitating' deportation from the border areas.

However, this idea by Park, Martin, Hirsch, Weiner, and other "revisionists", that the Soviet deported peoples either were not fully loyal or had not proven their loyalties beyond a reasonable doubt in the late 1930s prior to World War II, has been refuted through their actions defending the USSR as part of the INO (foreign division) of the OPGU-NKVD-KGB intelligence operations outside of the USSR from 1920 to 1945 and even to the end of the USSR. Thus, the primary explanation is that the Soviet "nationalities deportations" and the selection of who would be deported versus those who would not be was based in great part on ethnic and racial prejudices, stereotypes and tropes. This is because those not stigmatized as "enemies of the state" did not prove themselves to be any more loyal than those who were deported. The work of Jon K. Chang, Andrews, Mitrokhin, Sudoplatov, and others have shown that the Soviet Koreans, Chinese, Poles, Germans, Finns, Greeks, Iranians, and Turks served loyally in Soviet espionage operations abroad from 1920 to 1945. The USSR utilized approximately 1,200 or more East Asians in Soviet intelligence. Soviet Germans, Poles, and Turks (using Turks, Tatars, Azeris, and others) were recruited in higher numbers than the East Asians for the overseas (INO) operations. The fact that large numbers of Soviet minorities (Soviet Muslims, the diaspora peoples, Siberians and the Finno-Ugric peoples of the USSR) were recruited from each of the Soviet communities showed that there was widespread support, loyalties and generally, a deep inculcation of Soviet values.

Robert Conquest stated that these nationalities were transferred because they "in Stalin's view, either welcomed or not opposed the Germans".

In contrast, the views of J. Otto Pohl and Jon K. Chang affirm that the Soviet Union, its officials and everyday citizens produced and reproduced (from the Tsarist era) racialized (primordialist) views, policies and tropes regarding their non-Slavic peoples. Norman M. Naimark believed that the Stalinist "nationalities deportations" were forms of national-cultural genocide. The deportations at the very least changed the cultures, way of life and world views of the deported peoples as the majority were sent to Soviet Central Asia and Siberia.

"Primordialism" is simply another way of saying ethnic chauvinism or racism because the said "primordial" peoples or ethnic groups are seen as possessing "permanent" traits and characteristics, which they pass on, one generation to the next. Both Chang and Martin agree that the Stalinist regime took a turn towards primordializing nationality in the 1930s. After the "primordialist turn" by the Stalinist regime in the mid-1930s, the Soviet Greeks, Finns, Poles, Chinese, Koreans, Germans, Crimean Tatars, and the other deported peoples were seen to have loyalties to their titular nations (or to non-Soviet polities) as the Soviet state in the 1930s regarded nationality (ethnicity) and political loyalty (ideology) as a primordial equivalents. Thus, it was no surprise that the regime would choose "deportation."

Martin's different interpretation is that the Soviet regime was not deporting the various diaspora peoples because of their nationality. Rather, nationality (ethnicity or phenotype) served as a referent or a signifier for the political ideology of the deported peoples. Amir Weiner's argument is similar to Martin's, substituting "territorial identity" for Martin's "xenophobia." Chang disagrees that "xenophobia" can refer to national minorities. Koguryo followed by Parhae/Balhae/Bohai were the first states of the Russian Far East. John J. Stephan called the "erasure" of Chinese and Korean history (state-formation, cultural contributions, peoples) to the region by the USSR and Russia—the intentional "genesis of a 'blank spot.' "

Chang notes that all forms of racism could be explained away in a like manner in Martin's "Soviet xenophobia" and Weiner's "territorial identities" theories. Regardless, all of the Stalinist orders for "total deportation" of the thirteen nationalities (from 1937 to 1951) list each of the peoples by ethnicity as well as a charge of treason. Soviet law required that one's guilt or innocence (for treason) be determined individually and in a court of law prior to sentencing (per the 1936 Constitution). Finally, on the other end of the "primordial" spectrum, the East Slavs (Russians, Ukrainians, and Belarusians) were seen as inherently more loyal and more representative of the Soviet people. This is clearly a deviation from socialism and Marxist–Leninism.

== Death toll ==
The number of deaths attributed to deported people living in exile is considerable. The causes for such demographic catastrophe lie in harsh climates of Siberia and Kazakhstan, disease, malnutrition, and work exploitation which lasted for up to 12 hours daily, as well as the lack of any kind of appropriate housing or accommodation for the deported people. Overall, it is assumed that the fatalities caused by this relocation upheaval range from 800,000 up to 1,500,000.

The partial documentation in the NKVD archives indicated that the mortality rates of these deported ethnic groups were considerable. The Meskhetian Turks had a 14.6% mortality rate, the Kalmyks 17.4%, people from Crimea 19.6%, while the Chechens, the Ingush and other people from the Northern Caucasus had the highest losses reaching 23.7%. The NKVD did not record excess deaths for the deported Soviet Koreans, but their mortality rate estimates range from 10% to 16.3%.

Number of deaths of peoples in exile, 1930s–1950s
| Group | Estimated number of deaths | References |
|---|---|---|
| Kulaks 1930–1937 | 389,521 | |
| Soviet Germans | 150,000–400,000 | |
| Chechens | 100,000–400,000 | |
| Poles | 90,000 | |
| Koreans | 16,500–40,000 | |
| Estonians | 5,400 | |
| Latvians | 17,400 | |
| Lithuanians | 28,000 | |
| Finns | 18,800 | |
| Greeks | 15,000 | |
| Hungarians | 15,000–20,000 | |
| Karachays | 13,100–35,000 | |
| Kalmyks | 12,600–48,000 | |
| Ingush | 20,300–23,000 | |
| Balkars | 7,600–11,000 | |
| Crimean Tatars | 34,300–109,956 | |
| Meskhetian Turks | 12,859–50,000 | |
| Total | 800,000–1,500,000 | |

Additionally, around 300,000–360,000 Germans deported after World War II from occupied territories in Eastern Europe perished, but the Soviet Army was not the sole perpetrator of these expulsions, since other European countries also participated.

== Timeline ==
| Date of transfer | Targeted group | Approximate numbers | Place of initial residence | Transfer destination | Stated reasons for transfer |
|---|---|---|---|---|---|
| April 1920 | Cossacks, Terek Cossacks | 45,000 | North Caucasus | Ukraine, northern Russian SFSR | "De-Cossackization", stopping Russian colonisation of North Caucasus |
| 1930–1931 | Kulaks | 1,679,528- 1,803,392 | "Regions of total collectivization", most of Russian SFSR, Ukraine, other regions | Northern Russian SFSR, Ural, Siberia, North Caucasus, Kazakh ASSR, Kirghiz ASSR | Collectivization |
| 1930–1937 | Kulaks | 15,000,000 | "Regions of total collectivization", most of Russian SFSR, Ukraine, other regions | Northern Russian SFSR, Ural, Siberia, North Caucasus, Kazakh ASSR, Kirghiz ASSR | Collectivization |
| November–December 1932 | Peasants | 45,000 - 46,000 | Krasnodar Krai (Russian SFSR) | Northern Russia | Sabotage |
| May 1933 | People from Moscow and Leningrad who had been unable to obtain an internal passport | 6,000 | Moscow and Leningrad | Nazino Island | "cleanse Moscow, Leningrad and the other great urban centers of the USSR of superfluous elements not connected with production or administrative work, as well as kulaks, criminals, and other antisocial and socially dangerous elements." |
| February–May 1935; September 1941; 1942 | Ingrian Finns | 420,000 | Leningrad Oblast, Karelia (Russian SFSR) | Astrakhan Oblast, Vologda Oblast, Western Siberia, Kazakhstan, Tajikistan, Finland | |
| February–March 1935 | Germans and Poles | 412,000 | Central and western Ukraine | Eastern Ukraine | |
| May 1936 | Germans and Poles | 45,000 | Border regions of Ukraine | Ukraine | |
| July 1937 | Kurds | 1,325 | Border regions of Georgia, Azerbaijan, Armenia, Turkmenistan, Uzbekistan, and Tajikistan | Kazakhstan, Kirghizia | |
| September–October 1937 | Koreans | 172,000 | Far East | Northern Kazakhstan, Uzbekistan | |
| September–October 1937 | Chinese and Harbin Russians | At least 17,500 | Southern Far East | Xinjiang, Kazakhstan, Uzbekistan | At least 12,000 Chinese citizens were deported to Xinjiang, while 5,500 Chinese Soviet citizens were deported to Central Asia. |
| 1938 | Persian Jews | 6,000 | Mary Province (Turkmenistan) | Deserted areas of northern Turkmenistan | |
| January 1938 | Azeris, Persians, Kurds, and Assyrians | 6,000 | Azerbaijan | Kazakhstan | Iranian citizenship |
| January 1940 – 1941 | Poles, Jews, and Ukrainians (including refugees from Poland) | 320,000 | Western Ukraine, western Byelorussia | Northern Russian SFSR, Ural, Siberia, Kazakhstan, Uzbekistan | |
| June 1940 | Norwegians, Finns, Swedes, Estonians, Latvians, and Lithuanians | 6,973 | Murmansk and Murmansk Oblast | Karelo-Finnish SSR and later to Arkhangelsk Oblast | Lavrenty Beria's order of 23 June 1940 about resettlement of "citizens of foreign nationalities" |
| June 1940 | Germans, Poles, Chinese, Greeks, Koreans, and other "citizens of foreign nationalities" | 1,743 | Murmansk and Murmansk Oblast | Altai Krai | Lavrenty Beria's order of 23 June 1940 about resettlement of "citizens of foreign nationalities" |
| July 1940 to 1953 | Estonians, Latvians, and Lithuanians | 203,590 | Baltic states | Siberia and Northern Russian SFSR | |
| September 1941 – March 1942 | Germans | 855,674 | Povolzhye, the Caucasus, Crimea, Ukraine, Moscow, central Russian SFSR | Kazakhstan, Siberia | |
| August 1943 | Karachays | 69,267 | Karachay–Cherkess AO, Stavropol Krai (Russian SFSR) | Kazakhstan, Kirghizia, other | Banditism, other |
| December 1943 | Kalmyks | 93,139 | Kalmyk ASSR, (Russian SFSR) | Kazakhstan, Siberia | |
| February 1944 | Chechens and Ingush | 478,479 | North Caucasus | Kazakhstan, Kirghizia | 1940-1944 insurgency in Chechnya |
| April 1944 | Kurds and Azeris | 3,000 | Tbilisi (Georgia) | Southern Georgia | |
| May 1944 | Balkars | 37,406–40,900 | North Caucasus | Kazakhstan, Kirghizia | |
| May 1944 | Crimean Tatars | 191,014 | Crimea | Uzbekistan | |
| May–June 1944 | Greeks, Bulgarians, Armenians, and Turks | 37,080 (9,620 Armenians, 12,040 Bulgarians, 15,040 Greeks) | Crimea | Uzbekistan (?) | |
| June 1944 | Kabardians | 2,000 | Kabardino-Balkarian ASSR, (Russian SFSR) | Southern Kazakhstan | Collaboration with the Nazis |
| July 1944 | Russian True Orthodox Church members | 1,000 | Central Russian SFSR | Siberia | |
| November 1944 | Meskhetian Turks, Kurds, Hemshins, Pontic Greeks, Karapapakhs, Lazes, and other inhabitants of the border zone | 115,000 | Southwestern Georgia | Uzbekistan, Kazakhstan, Kirghizia | |
| November 1944 – January 1945 | Hungarians and Germans | 30,000–40,000 | Transcarpathian Ukraine | Ural, Donbas, Byelorussia | |
| January 1945 | "Traitors and collaborators" | 2,000 | Mineralnye Vody (Russian SFSR) | Tajikistan | Collaboration with the Nazis |
| 1945–1946 | Repatriated Soviet Germans who had lived under German control during World War II | Over 200,000 | | Siberia and Kazakhstan | |
| 1944–1953 | Families of the Ukrainian Insurgent Army | 204,000 | Western Ukraine | Siberia | |
| 1944–1953 | Poles | 1,240,000 | Kresy region | postwar Poland | Removal of indigenous population from the new territory acquired by Soviet Union |
| 1945–1950 | Germans | Tens of thousands | Königsberg | West or Middle Germany | Removal of indigenous population from the new territory acquired by Soviet Union |
| 1945–1951 | Japanese and Koreans | 400,000 | Mostly from Sakhalin, Kuril Islands | Siberia, Far East, North Korea, Japan | Removal of indigenous population from the new territory acquired by Soviet Union |
| 1948–1951 | Azeris | 100,000 | Armenia | Kura-Aras Lowland, Azerbaijan | "Measures for resettlement of collective farm workers" |
| May–June 1949 | Greeks, Armenians, and Turks | 57,680 (including 15,485 Dashnaks) | The Black Sea coast (Russian SFSR), South Caucasus | Southern Kazakhstan | Membership in the nationalist Dashnaktsutiun Party (Armenians), Greek or Turkish citizenship (Greeks): "suspect cross-border ethnic ties." |
| March 1951 | Basmachis | 2,795 | Tajikistan | Northern Kazakhstan | |
| April 1951 | Jehovah's Witnesses | 8,576–9,500 | Mostly from Moldavia and Ukraine | Western Siberia | Operation North |
| 1991 | Armenians | 24 villages, 17,000 people | Nagorno-Karabakh | Armenia | Operation Ring Desire to re-unify with Armenia and/or obtain more autonomy from the Azeri SSR. |
| 1920 to 1953 | Total | ~20,296,000 - | | | |

== See also ==
- Against Their Will
- Demographic engineering
- Doctors' plot: Speculation about a planned deportation of Jews
- Jewish Autonomous Oblast: Jewish settlement in the region
- List of ethnic cleansing campaigns

== Citations ==
=== Bibliography ===
- Bernstein, Seth (2019). "Ambiguous Homecoming: Retribution, Exploitation and Social Tensions During Repatriation to the USSR, 1944–1946". Past & Present. 242 (1): 193–226. doi:10.1093/pastj/gty044.
- Bethell, Nicholas (1974). The Last Secret: Forcible Repatriation to Russia, 1944–47. London: Andre Deutsch. ISBN 978-0-233-96613-7.
- Andrew, Christopher; Mitrokhin, Vasili (2005). The World Was Going Our Way: The KGB and the Battle for the Third World. New York: Basic Books. ISBN 9781422393123. LCCN 1422393127.
- Council of Europe (19 March 2007). Documents: working papers, 2006 ordinary session (third part), 26–30 June 2006, Vol. 4: Documents 10868, 10886, 10893, 10903-10950. Council of Europe. p. 158. ISBN 9789287160270.
- Askerov, Ali (2015). Historical Dictionary of the Chechen Conflict. Rowman & Littlefield. p. 12. ISBN 9781442249257. LCCN 2015-000755.
- Allworth, Edward (1998). The Tatars of Crimea: Return to the Homeland: Studies and Documents. Durham: Duke University Press. ISBN 9780822319948. LCCN 97019110. OCLC 610947243.
- Baran, Emily B. (2016). Dissent on the Margins: How Soviet Jehovah's Witnesses Defied Communism and Lived to Preach about It (repeated ed.). Oxford University Press. ISBN 978-0190495497.
- Bekus, Nelly (2010). Struggle Over Identity: The Official and the Alternative "Belarusianness". Budapest: Central European University Press. ISBN 9789639776685. LCCN 2010008736.
- Bognár, Zalán (2012). "A kárpátaljai magyar és német polgári lakosság tömeges elhurcolása szovjet hadifogságba" [The deportation of masses of Hungarian and German civilians from Subcarpathia to Soviet prisoner of war camps]. Orpheus Noster (in Hungarian). 4 (2). Budapest: Károli Gáspár Református Egyetem: 46–60.
- Bryan, Fanny E. (1984). "Anti-religious activity in the Chechen-Ingush republic of the USSR and the survival of Islam". Central Asian Survey. 3 (2): 99–115. doi:10.1080/02634938408400466.
- Buckley, Cynthia J.; Ruble, Blair A.; Hofmann, Erin Trouth (2008). Migration, Homeland, and Belonging in Eurasia. Woodrow Wilson Center Press. p. 207. ISBN 978-0801890758. LCCN 2008-015571.
- Bugay, Nikolay (1996). The Deportation of Peoples in the Soviet Union. Nova Publishers. ISBN 978-1560723714.
- Chang, Jon K. (2014). "Tsarist continuities in Soviet nationalities policy: A case of Korean territorial autonomy in the Soviet Far East, 1923-1937". Eurasia Studies Society of Great Britain & Europe Journal. 3: 32–33.
- Chang, Jon K. (2018). Burnt by the Sun: The Koreans of the Russian Far East. Honolulu: University of Hawaii Press. ISBN 9780824876746. LCCN 2015046032.
- Chang, Jon K. (2019a). "East Asians in Soviet Intelligence and the Continuities between Soviet and Russian Intelligence Practices". The Intelligencer. 24 (1): 23–29.
- Chang, Jon K. (2019b). "Ethnic Cleansing and Revisionist Russian and Soviet History". Academic Questions. 32 (2): 263–270. doi:10.1007/s12129-019-09791-8 (inactive 1 July 2025). S2CID 150711796.
- Chang, Jon K. (2023). "East Asians in Soviet Intelligence: A Study of Five Soviet "Naturals"". Region. 12 (2): 147–170. doi:10.1353/reg.2023.a936449. JSTOR 27333832.
- Chang, Jon K. (2024). "East Asians in Soviet Intelligence: The "Naturals"--One Variant of Soviet Illegal". The Intelligencer. 29 (1): 33–43.
- Davoliūtė, Violeta (2014). The Making and Breaking of Soviet Lithuania: Memory and Modernity in the Wake of War. Routledge. ISBN 9781134693580.
- Dundovich, Elena; Gori, Francesca; Guercetti, Emanuela (2003). Reflections on the Gulag: With a Documentary Index on the Italian Victims of Repression in the USSR (37 ed.). Greenwood Publishing Group. ISBN 978-8807990588.
- Ellman, Michael (2002). "Soviet Repression Statistics: Some Comments" (PDF). Europe-Asia Studies. 54 (7): 1151–1172. doi:10.1080/0966813022000017177. JSTOR 826310. S2CID 43510161. Archived from the original (PDF) on 27 April 2018.
- Fisher, Alan W. (2014). Crimean Tatars. Stanford, California: Hoover Press. ISBN 9780817966638. LCCN 76041085. OCLC 946788279.
- Fredholm, Michael (2000). "The prospects for genocide in Chechnya and extremist retaliation against the West". Central Asian Survey. 19 (3): 315–327. doi:10.1080/026349300750057955. S2CID 145806371.
- Frucht, Richard C. (2004). Eastern Europe: an introduction to the people, lands, and culture. Vol. 2. ABC-CLIO. p. 28. ISBN 978-1576078006.
- Grieb, Christiane (2014). "War Crimes, Soviet, World War II". In C. Dowling, Timothy (ed.). Russia at War: From the Mongol Conquest to Afghanistan, Chechnya, and Beyond. ABC-CLIO. ISBN 9781598849486. LCCN 2014017775.
- Griffin, Nicholas (2004). Caucasus: A Journey to the Land Between Christianity and Islam. Chicago: University of Chicago Press. ISBN 9780226308593. LCCN 2003063352.
- Gross, Feliks (1998). The Civic and the Tribal State: The State, Ethnicity, and the Multiethnic State. Greenwood Publishing Group. ISBN 9780313291456. LCCN 98012329.
- Hirsch, Francine (2002). "Race without the Practice of Racial Politics". Slavic Review. 61 (1): 30–43. doi:10.2307/2696979. JSTOR 2696979. S2CID 147121638.
- Joes, Anthony James (2010). "Guerrilla Warfare". In Fink, George (ed.). Stress of War, Conflict and Disaster. Academic Press. p. 357. ISBN 9780123813824. LCCN 2010024875.
- Jones, Adam (2016). Genocide: A Comprehensive Introduction (revised ed.). Routledge. p. 203. ISBN 9781317533856.
- Kleveman, Lutz (2002). Der Kampf um das Heilige Feuer: Wettlauf der Weltmächte am Kaspischen Meer (in German). Rowohlt. p. 87. ISBN 9783871344565.
- Korostelina, K. (2007). Social Identity and Conflict: Structures, Dynamics, and Implications. Springer. p. 9. ISBN 9780230605671.
- Legters, Lyman H. (1992). "The American Genocide". In Lyden, Fremont J. (ed.). Native Americans and Public Policy. Pittsburgh: University of Pittsburgh Press. ISBN 9780822976820. OCLC 555693841.
- Kotljarchuk, Andrej (2014). "3. The Nordic Threat: Soviet Ethnic Cleansing on the Kola Peninsula". In Norbert Götz (ed.). The Sea of Identities: A Century of Baltic and East European Experiences with Nationality, Class, and Gender (PDF). p. 53.
- Margolis, Eric (2008). American Raj: Liberation Or Domination?. Key Porter Books. p. 277. ISBN 9781554700875. LCCN 2008431610.
- Martin, Terry (1998). "The Origins of Soviet Ethnic Cleansing" (PDF). The Journal of Modern History. 70 (4): 813–861. doi:10.1086/235168. JSTOR 10.1086/235168. S2CID 32917643.
- Mawdsley, Evan (1998). The Stalin Years: The Soviet Union, 1929–1953. Manchester University Press. ISBN 9780719046001. LCCN 2003046365.
- McColl, R. W. (2014). Encyclopedia of World Geography - Facts on File library of world geography. Infobase Publishing. p. 803. ISBN 9780816072293. OCLC 58431770.
- Mikaberidze, Alexander (2015). Historical Dictionary of Georgia (2 ed.). Lanham, Maryland: Rowman & Littlefield. ISBN 9781442241466. LCCN 2014024518.
- Morris, James (2004). "The Polish terror: spy mania and ethnic cleansing in the great terror". Europe-Asia Studies. 56 (5): 751–766. doi:10.1080/0966813041000235137. S2CID 154560102.
- Naimark, Norman M. (2010). Stalin's Genocides. Princeton: Princeton University Press. ISBN 9780691147840. LCCN 2010019063.
- Pai, Hyung Il (2000). Constructing "Korean" Origins: A Critical Review of Archaeology, Historiography, and Racial Myth in Korean State-Formation Theories. Cambridge: Harvard University Press. ISBN 9780674002449.
- Park, Alyssa M. (2019). Sovereignty experiments: Korean migrants and the building of borders in northeast Asia, 1860-1945. Ithaca: Cornell University Press. ISBN 9781501738371. LCCN 2019001070.
- Pavlenko, Aneta (2008). Multilingualism in Post-Soviet Countries. Multilingual Matters. ISBN 9781847690876. LCCN 2008012757.
- Pettai, Eva-Clarita; Pettai, Vello (2014). Transitional and Retrospective Justice in the Baltic States. Cambridge University Press. ISBN 978-1107049499. LCCN 2014-043729.
- Pohl, J. Otto (1997). The Stalinist Penal System. McFarland. ISBN 0786403365.
- Pohl, J. Otto (1999). Ethnic Cleansing in the USSR, 1937–1949. Westport, CT: Greenwood Press. ISBN 978-0-313-30921-2. LCCN 98-046822.
- Pohl, J. Otto (2000). "Stalin's genocide against the "Repressed Peoples"". Journal of Genocide Research. 2 (2): 267–293. doi:10.1080/713677598. S2CID 59194258.
- Polian, Pavel (2004). Against Their Will: The History and Geography of Forced Migrations in the USSR. Budapest: Central European University Press. ISBN 978-9-639-24168-8.
- Rywkin, Michael (1994). Moscow's Lost Empire. Routledge. ISBN 9781315287713. LCCN 93029308.
- Salitan, Laurie P. (1992). Rosemary Thorp (ed.). Politics and Nationality in Contemporary Soviet-Jewish Emigration, 1968-89. Springer. ISBN 978-1349097562.
- Sanford, George (2007). Katyn and the Soviet Massacre of 1940: Truth, Justice and Memory. Routledge. ISBN 9781134302994. LCCN 2004-065124.
- Statiev, Alexandar (2010). "Soviet ethnic deportations: intent versus outcome". Journal of Genocide Research. 11 (2–3): 243–264. doi:10.1080/14623520903118961. S2CID 71905569.
- Stephan, John J. (1994). The Russian Far East: A History. Stanford: Stanford University Press. ISBN 9780804727013.
- Ther, Philipp (2014). The Dark Side of Nation-States: Ethnic Cleansing in Modern Europe. Göttingen: Berghahn Books. p. 118. ISBN 9781782383031. LCCN 2011516970.
- Tishkov, Valery (2004). Chechnya: Life in a War-Torn Society. Vol. 6. Berkeley: University of California Press. p. 33. ISBN 9780520930209. LCCN 2003017330.
- Viola, Lynne (2007). The Unknown Gulag: The Lost World of Stalin's Special Settlements. Oxford University Press. p. 32. ISBN 9780195187694.
- Weiner, Amir (2002). "Nothing but Certainty". Slavic Review. 61 (1): 44–53. doi:10.2307/2696980. JSTOR 2696980. S2CID 159548222.
- Werth, Nicolas (2004). "Strategies of Violence in the Stalinist USSR". In Rousso, Henry; Golsan, Richard Joseph (eds.). Stalinism and Nazism: History and Memory Compared. University of Nebraska Press. ISBN 9780803290006. LCCN 2003026805.
- Werth, Nicholas (2008). "The Crimes of the Stalin Regime: Outline for an Inventory and Classification". In Stone, Dan (ed.). The Historiography of Genocide (repeated ed.). Basingstoke: Palgrave Macmillan. p. 412. ISBN 9780230297784. LCCN 2007048561.
- Williams, Brian Glyn (2015). The Crimean Tatars: From Soviet Genocide to Putin's Conquest. London, New York: Oxford University Press. ISBN 9780190494728. LCCN 2015033355.
- Zemskov, Viktor (2004). "Репатриация перемещённых советских граждан" [Repatriation of Displaced Soviet Citizens]. Научно-просветительский журнал «Скепсис» (in Russian).
- Zemskov, Viktor (2011). "К вопросу о судьбе советских репатриантов в СССР (1944-1955)" [The Fate of Soviet Repatriates in the USSR (1944-1955)]. Политическое просвещение (Politpros.com) (in Russian).

== Wikisource ==
- State Defense Committee Decree No. 5859ss: On Crimean Tatars (See also Three answers to the Decree No. 5859ss)
