= Nazino tragedy =

1933 mass murder and deportation in the Soviet Union

Coordinates: 60.106°N 78.943°E

- Location of Nazino Island within Tomsk Oblast, Russia
- Date: 1933
- Location: Nazino Island, central USSR
- Type: Failed attempt to establish an isolated prison camp
- Deaths: 4,000 (estimated)

The Nazino tragedy (Russian: Назинская трагедия, romanized: Nazinskaya tragediya) was the forced resettlement of around 6,700 prisoners to Nazino Island, located on the Ob River in West Siberian Krai, Russian Soviet Federative Socialist Republic, Soviet Union (now Tomsk Oblast, Russia), in May 1933. Sent to construct a "special settlement" and cultivate the island, the deportees were abandoned with only scant supplies of flour for food, little to no tools, and virtually none of the clothing or shelter necessary to survive the harsh Siberian climate. Conditions on Nazino Island deteriorated quickly and resulted in widespread disease, violence, and cannibalism. Within 13 weeks, over 4,000 of the deportees had died or disappeared, and the majority of the survivors were in ill health. Those who attempted to leave were killed by armed guards.

The original report on the incident was made by Vasily A. Velichko, a Soviet propaganda worker, and passed to Joseph Stalin and to other members of the Politburo. The report remained classified until the human rights organisation Memorial conducted an investigation in 1988, five decades after the events. The tragedy was further publicized in 2002, when reports from a September 1933 special commission by the Communist Party were published by Memorial.

== Background ==
In February 1933, Genrikh Yagoda, head of the OGPU (a secret police), and Matvei Berman, head of the GULAG labor camp system, proposed to Joseph Stalin, the General Secretary of the Soviet Union, to resettle up to two million people to Siberia and the Kazakh Autonomous Socialist Soviet Republic in "special settlements". The deportees, or "settlers", were to bring over a million hectares (2.5 million acres) of virgin land in the sparsely populated regions into production and become self-sufficient within two years. Yagoda and Berman's plan was based on the experience of deporting two million kulaks and other agricultural workers to the same areas that had occurred in the previous three years as part of the dekulakization policy. However, unlike the previous plan, resources available to support the new plan were severely limited by an ongoing famine in the Soviet Union. Despite this, the new plan was approved by the Council of People's Commissars on 11 March 1933. Shortly after the plan's approval, the number of prospective deportees was reduced to one million.

=== Deportees ===
The original plan targeted several types of kulaks, peasants, people living in the agricultural areas of Soviet Union's western territories such as the Ukrainian SSR and the Lower Volga, North Caucasus and Black Earth regions of the Russian Soviet Federative Socialist Republic. Instead, many of the deportees were people from Moscow, Leningrad and other cities who had been unable to obtain internal passports. The Soviet passportization campaign began with a decision by the Politburo on 27 December 1932 to issue internal passports to all residents of major cities, with one of their objectives being to "cleanse Moscow, Leningrad and the other great urban centers of the USSR of superfluous elements not connected with production or administrative work, as well as kulaks, criminals, and other antisocial and socially dangerous elements."

Deportees were primarily "lumpenproletariat and socially harmful elements", meaning former merchants and traders, peasants who had fled the ongoing famine in the countryside, petty criminals or anybody who did not fit into the idealized worker class structure. Their backgrounds meant they were not issued passports, and they could be arrested and deported from the cities after a summary administrative procedure. Most of the arrestees were deported within two days. Between March and July 1933, 85,937 people living in Moscow were arrested and deported because they lacked passports, while 4,776 people living in Leningrad were also deported. Those arrested in connection with the cleansing of Moscow prior to 1 May 1933 (International Workers' Day) were assigned to a transit camp in the city of Tomsk.

== Transportation ==
According to the plan proposed by Yagoda and Berman, the deportees would pass through transit camps at Tomsk, Omsk and Achinsk. The largest camp was at Tomsk that held 15,000 deportees. Over 25,000 deportees arrived in April even though the camp was not scheduled to be completed until 1 May. River transport to the final labor camps was closed until the start of May until ice on the Ob and Tom Rivers cleared. Most of the first arrivals were people without any papers on hand, alleged kulaks, other agricultural workers and people from southern Russian cities. The arrival of so many deportees panicked Tomsk authorities, who viewed them as "starving and contagious".

A report by Vassily Arsenievich Velichko, the local Communist Party head in Narymsky District of the West Siberian Krai, gave twenty-two examples of people who had been deported:

It is hard to tell how many, even who (died), because declared documents had been confiscated at the time of arrest, or by police organs at the detention centers, or on the train by criminals who used them to smoke. However, some of them brought their documents with them: party and party candidate cards, Komsomol cards, passports, certificates from the factories, factory passes, etc. ...

1. Novozhilov, Vl., from Moscow. Kompressor works. Driver. Awarded bonuses three times. Wife and child in Moscow. After work he was getting ready to go to the cinema with his wife. While she was getting dressed, he stepped out to smoke a cigarette and was apprehended.
2. Guseva, an old woman. She lives in Murom. Her husband is an old communist, chief officer of the Murom railway station, who has worked there twenty-three years. Her son works there as an apprentice engine driver. Guseva came to Moscow to buy a suit for her husband and some white bread. Her documents did not help her.
3. Zelenin Grigory. A locksmith's apprentice at Borovsk weaving plant 'Red October'. Has been driving to Moscow with a treatment voucher. The voucher didn't help in being apprehended.
4. Vynogradova, kolkhoz worker. Has been going to her brother in Moscow. The brother serves as a chief of militsiya department no.8. Apprehended after her train arrival at Moscow.
5. Voikyn, Nik. Vas. KSM member since 1929, worker of the plant 'Red Textile Worker' in Serpukhov. <...> Awarded bonuses thrice. At his weekend headed to a football match. Passport has been left at home. Apprehended.
6. Matveyev I.M. Construction worker at bakery no.9. Up until December, 1933, has had a seasonal passport. Apprehended with the passport. According to his own words, no one at all managed at least to check his document.

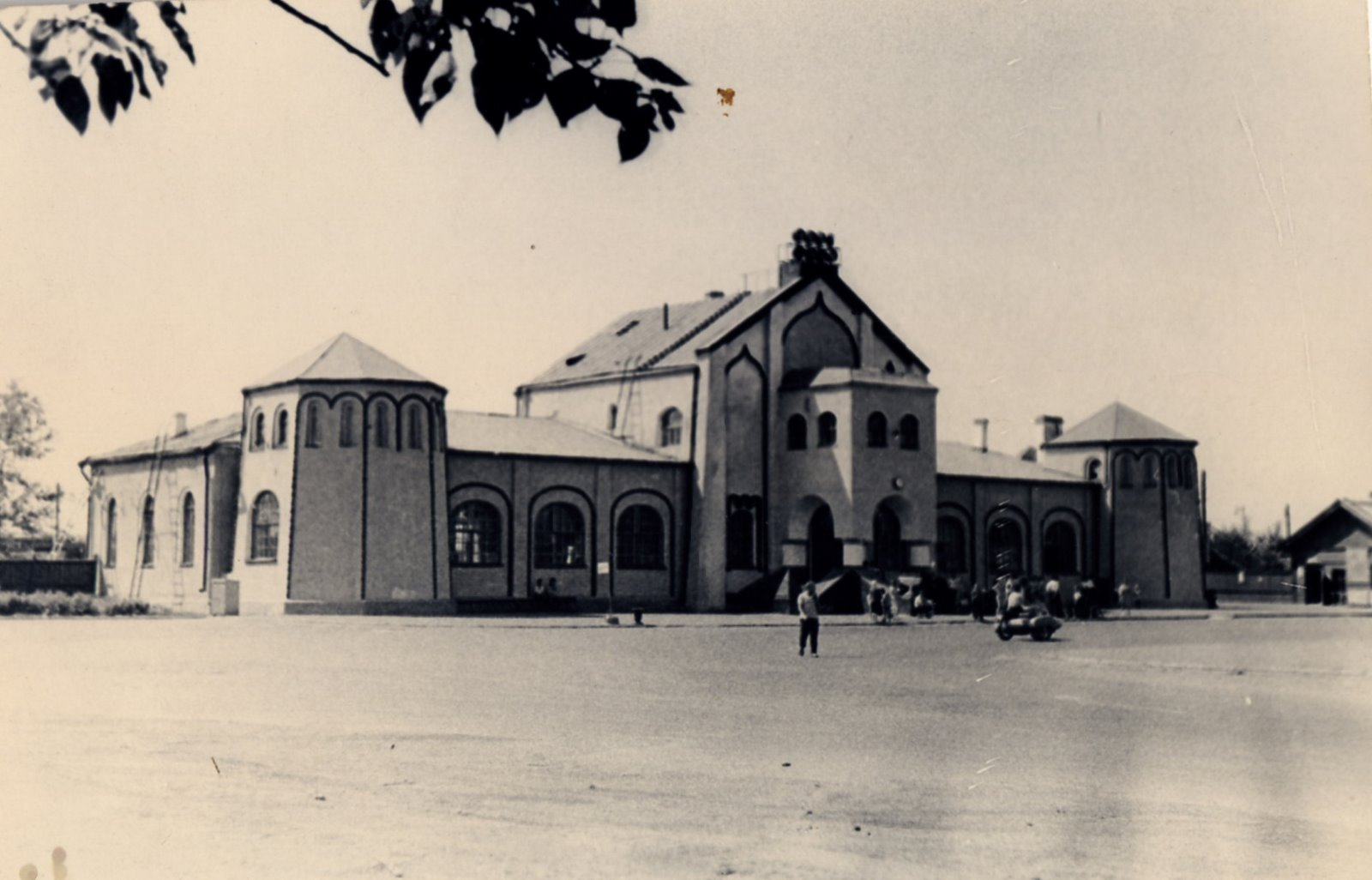
Murom railway station

A rail convoy holding "underclass" deportees left Moscow on 30 April, and a similar convoy left Leningrad on 29 April, with both arriving on 10 May. The daily food ration during the trip was 300 grams (11 oz) of bread per person. Criminal groups among the deportees beat the non-criminals and stole their food and clothing. The authorities in Tomsk were unfamiliar with urban deportees and expected trouble from them, so decided to send them to the most isolated work sites. Two nights after their arrival in Tomsk, a disturbance broke out as they demanded drinking water, but the riot was put down by mounted troops.

Many of the urban deportees were later sent to Nazino Island (Russian: остров Назино), a swampy river island on the Ob River located 800 kilometers (500 mi) north of Tomsk, in a particularly empty part of Western Siberia inhabited by only a small number of indigenous Ostyak people. Four river barges, which were designed to haul timber, were filled with about 5,000 deportees on 14 May. About a third of the deportees were criminals who had been sent in order to "decongest the prisons". About half were so-called lumpenproletarians from Moscow and Leningrad. The authorities who were to be in charge of the labor camps were first informed that they would be sent on 5 May. These authorities had never worked with urban deportees and had no resources or supplies to support them. The deportees were kept below decks on the barges and apparently fed a daily ration of 200 grams (7 oz) of bread per person. Twenty tons of flour – about 4 kilograms (9 lb) per person – were also transported, but the barges contained no other food, cooking utensils or tools. All supervisory personnel, two commanders and fifty guards were newly recruited and had no shoes or uniforms.

== Nazino Island ==
Interactive map

During the afternoon of 18 May, the barges unloaded their passengers on Nazino Island, an island about 3 kilometres (1.9 mi) long and 600 metres (660 yd) wide. There was no roster of the disembarking deportees, but on arrival 322 women and 4,556 men were counted, plus 27 bodies of those who died during the trip from Tomsk. Over a third of the deportees were too weak to stand on arrival. About 1,200 additional deportees arrived on 27 May. A fight broke out and guards fired on the deportees as the twenty tons of flour were deposited on the island and distribution began. The flour was moved to the shore opposite the island and distribution was tried again the next morning, with another fight and more firing resulting. Afterward, all flour was distributed via "brigadiers" who collected flour for their brigade of about 150 people. The brigadiers were often criminals who abused their privileges and ate everything themselves. Initially there were no ovens to bake bread on, so the deportees ate the flour mixed with river water, which led to dysentery. Some deportees made primitive rafts to try to escape, but most of the rafts collapsed and hundreds of corpses washed up on the shore below the island. Guards hunted and killed other escapees as if they were hunting animals for sport. Because of the lack of any transportation to the rest of the country except upstream to Tomsk, and the harshness of life in the taiga, any other escapees who made it across the river and evaded the guards were ultimately presumed dead. Shortly after the deportees had already arrived on Nazino Island, Yagoda and Berman's plan was rejected by Stalin.

Order on Nazino Island quickly broke down: the majority of the population, being city dwellers, knew nothing about basic agricultural practices such as clearing and cultivation that would make the island properly habitable. The sparsity of resources led to the formation of gangs who began to terrorize and dominate weaker settlers. People were frequently murdered in fights over food or money, and the bodies of those in possession of anything of value such as gold tooth fillings and crowns were often looted. The latter were used for exchange for food and cigarettes by gang members. Meanwhile, the guards established their own reign of terror, extorting settlers and executing people for minor offences despite being apathetic towards the gangs. Even the doctors sent to monitor the island's population, who were supposed to have protection, began to fear for their lives. The lack of proper food and the rising death toll by late May led to cannibalism becoming widespread, to the point that settlers eventually began murdering individuals for the sole purpose of consuming them. On 21 May, the three health officers counted seventy new deaths, with signs of cannibalism observed in five cases. Over the next month, guards arrested about fifty people for cannibalism.

=== Aftermath ===
The situation on Nazino Island was finally ended in early June, when Soviet authorities dissolved the settlement and the surviving 2,856 deportees were transferred to smaller settlements upstream on the Nazina River, leaving 157 deportees who could not be moved from the island for health reasons. Despite the settlement being dissolved, several hundred more of the deportees died during the transfer. People who survived the transfer found themselves with few tools, little food and facing an outbreak of typhus. Most deportees refused to work in the new settlements due to their previous treatment. In early July, new settlements were constructed using non-deportee labor, but only 250 Nazino settlers were transferred to these. Instead, 4,200 new deportees who arrived from Tomsk were housed in these settlements. In a period of thirteen weeks, of the roughly 6,000 deportee settlers intended for Nazino Island, between 1,500 and 2,000 had died due to starvation, exposure, disease, murder or accidental death. Another 2,000 settlers had disappeared and their whereabouts were untraceable, so they were presumed dead. The death tolls include people who either died or disappeared during their transportation to or from the island.

The report on the situation at Nazino Island, which had been sent to Stalin by Velichko, was distributed by Lazar Kaganovich to members of the Politburo and was preserved in an archive in Novosibirsk. It stated that 6,114 "outdated elements" arrived on the island in May 1933, and at least 27 people died during the river transport. There was no shelter on the island; it snowed the first night, and no food was distributed for four days. On the first day 295 people were buried. Velichko's report claimed only 2,200 people survived out of about 6,700 (6100 and additional 500–600 people) deportees that he calculated had arrived from Tomsk. The report resulted in a commission by the Communist Party to study the affair. In October, the commission estimated that of the roughly 2,000 survivors from Nazino Island, half were ill and bedridden and that only about 200 to 300 were physically capable of working. Local officials and guards at the island attempted to dispute Velichko's report but were instead reprimanded, receiving prison sentences ranging between twelve months to three years.

The events that occurred at Nazino Island highlighted issues with Soviet colonization projects, and the Soviet leadership began to doubt their quality and efficiency. In 1933 alone, there were 367,457 known untraceable "special resettlers", of which 151,601 were dismissed and 215,856 simply disappeared from their settlements. The Nazino incident directly led to the end of large-scale settlement plans in the Soviet Union, and to the end of using deportees from "urban déclassé elements" and criminal backgrounds for future settlement plans.

== Rediscovery ==
After the initial investigations in late 1933, the events at Nazino Island were forgotten as they were suppressed from being made public; only a small number of survivors, government officials and eyewitnesses knew of their occurrence. In 1988, at the time of the glasnost policy in the Soviet Union, details of the affair first became available to the general public through the efforts of the human rights group Memorial. In 1989, an eyewitness reported to Memorial:

They were trying to escape. They asked us, "Where's the railway?" We'd never seen a railway. They asked, "Where's Moscow? Leningrad?" They were asking the wrong people: we'd never heard of those places. We're Ostyaks. People were running away starving. They were given a handful of flour. They mixed it with water and drank it and then they immediately got diarrhea. The things we saw! People were dying everywhere; they were killing each other ... On the island there was a guard named Kostia Venikov, a young fellow. He fell in love with a girl who had been sent there and was courting her. He protected her. One day he had to be away for a while, and he told one of his comrades, "Take care of her," but with all the people there the comrade couldn't do much really... People caught the girl, tied her to a poplar tree, cut off her breasts, her muscles, everything they could eat, everything, everything ... They were hungry, they had to eat. When Kostia came back, she was still alive. He tried to save her, but she had lost too much blood.

French historian Nicolas Werth, who earlier co-authored The Black Book of Communism, published the book Cannibal Island about the affair in 2006. It was translated into English in 2007. In 2009 a documentary L'île aux Cannibales (Cannibal Island) was made, based on the book.

== See also ==
- Gulag
- Forced settlements in the Soviet Union
- Mass killings under Communist regimes
- Population transfers in the Soviet Union

== Sources ==
- Applebaum, Anne (2007), Gulag: A History (1st ed.), Anchor Books, ISBN 978-0-307-42612-3
- Courtois, Stephane; Werth, Nicolas; Panne, Jean-Louis; Paczkowski, Andrzej; Bartosek, Karel; Margolin, Jean-Louis; Kramer, Mark (1999), The Black Book of Communism: Crimes, Terror, Repression, Harvard University Press, pp. 154–155, ISBN 0-674-07608-7
- Khlevniuk, Oleg Vitalievich (2004), The history of the Gulag: from collectivization to the great terror, Yale University Press, p. 418, ISBN 978-0-300-09284-4
- Kiernan, Ben (2007), Blood and soil: a world history of genocide and extermination from Sparta to Darfur, Yale University Press, p. 724, ISBN 978-0-300-10098-3
- Memorial; Institute of History of the Siberian Branch of the Russian Academy of Science (2002), The Nazino Tragedy: A Documented Scholarly Edition, Tomsk
- Polian, P.M. (2004), Against their will: the history and geography of forced migrations in the USSR, Budapest: Central European University Press, p. 111, ISBN 978-963-9241-68-8
- Werth, Nicolas (2007), Cannibal Island: Death in a Siberian Gulag, Princeton University Press, ISBN 9780691130835
- Velichko, Vasily (22 August 1933). "Доклад инструктора-пропагандиста Нарымского окружного комитета РКП (б) Василия А. Величко И. В. Сталину, Р. И. Эйхе и секретарю Нарымского окружкома ВКП (б) К. И. Левиц" [Report by an instructor-propagandist of Narym Circuit Committee of RCP(b) Vasily A. Velichko to I. V. Stalin, R. I. Eikhe, and K. I. Levitz (secretary of the Committee)]. diletant.media (in Russian).
