= Special settlements in the Soviet Union =

Method of political repression in the Soviet Union

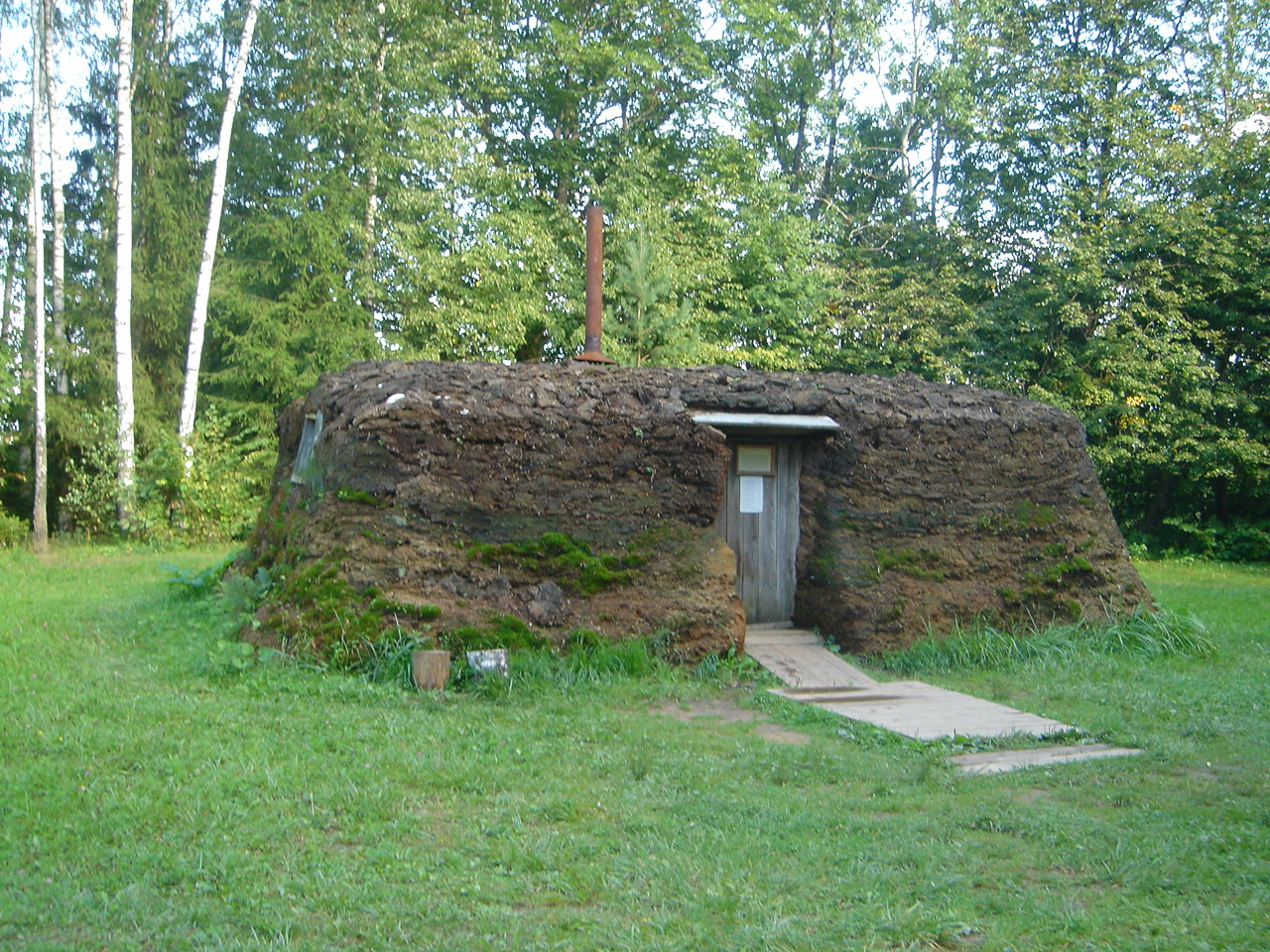
A dwelling typical to some deportees forcibly resettled to Siberia in a museum in Rumšiškės, Lithuania

Special settlements in the Soviet Union were the result of population transfers and were performed in a series of operations organized according to social class or nationality of the deported. Resettling of "enemy classes" such as prosperous peasants and entire populations by ethnicity was a method of political repression in the Soviet Union, although separate from the Gulag system of penal labor. Involuntary settlement played a role in the colonization of virgin lands of the Soviet Union. This role was specifically mentioned in the first Soviet decrees about involuntary labor camps. Compared to the Gulag labor camps, the involuntary settlements had the appearance of "normal" settlements: people lived in families, and there was slightly more freedom of movement; however, that was permitted only within a small specified area. All settlers were overseen by the NKVD; once a month a person had to register at a local law enforcement office at a selsoviet in rural areas or at a militsiya department in urban settlements. As second-class citizens, deported peoples designated as "special settlers" were prohibited from holding a variety of jobs, returning to their region of origin, attending prestigious schools, and even joining the cosmonaut program. Due to this, special settlements have been described as a type of apartheid by historian J. Otto Pohl.

After the special settlement system was officially abolished in the 1950s, most deported indigenous peoples were allowed to return to their homelands, except for the Crimean Tatars and Meskhetian Turks, who were denied the right of return in the Khrushchev and Brezhnev era and largely remained in areas they were deported to because of the Soviet residence permit system (propiska).

== Exile settlements ==
Exile settlements (ссыльное поселение, ssylnoye poselenie) were a kind of internal exile. The system of political and administrative exile existed in Imperial Russia as well. The most notable category of exile settlers in the Soviet Union (ссыльнопоселенцы, ssylnoposelentsy) were the whole nationalities resettled during Joseph Stalin's rule (1928–1953). At various times, a number of other terms were used for this category: special settlement (спецпоселение), special resettlement (спецпереселение), and administrative exile (административная высылка, a term which refers to an extrajudicial way of deciding the fates of people "by administrative means"). Exiles were sent to remote areas of the Soviet Union: Siberia, Kazakhstan, Central Asia, and the Russian Far East.

The major source of the population in exile settlements were victims of what is now called ethnic cleansing. The Soviet government feared that people of certain nationalities would act as "fifth column" subversives during the expected war, and took drastic measures to prevent this perceived threat. The deported were sent to prisons, labor camps, exile settlements, and "supervised residence" (residence in usual settlements, but under the monitoring of the NKVD).

== Forced resettlements ==
=== Deportations of 1928–1939 ===
In 1929, the government led by Joseph Stalin designated some regions (known as districts) of Western Siberia as locations for future deportations of what were referred to as "socially dangerous classes" of people from Belarus, Ukraine, and the northwestern part of European Russia. Siberian researchers note that deportations of this period may be characterized as "depeasantization" (Russian: раскрестьянивание) as peasants represented a significant share of those who experienced this kind of repression. In 1928, the Soviet Union underwent a goods famine known as the Soviet grain crisis; this led to the forced collectivization of agriculture. As a result, the government began to subject members of the farming population of the countryside peasantry to a policy of mass deportations; they were forcibly removed and sent to the regions selected for deportations. This policy was enforced up until 1933, when soviet authorities conducted series of so-called "city cleansings", by which they forced some of the marginalized population (peasants who had hid from earlier deportations, Romani people, and other targeted groups) to resettle. Streets of many cities like Leningrad and Moscow were raided by militia and those who were caught were sent to the East. This policy had fatal consequences for some who were targeted; one example of the harsh environment to which deportees were subjected is the infamous Nazino tragedy of 1933 that happened near Tomsk. The impact on the deportees to Nazino Island was devastating; over 4,000 people died or disappeared within thirteen weeks, having been given only raw flour to survive. The early deportations coincided with dekulakization and passportization policies of the Soviet Union.

=== Deportations from border territories in 1939–1941 ===
Several waves of forced resettlement occurred from the territories on the Western borders. These territories included Murmansk Oblast and the recently annexed lands invaded and occupied by the Soviets under the Molotov–Ribbentrop Pact with Nazi Germany; parts of Poland and Romania and the Baltic States.

In territories annexed from Poland (the Kresy territories and the Białystok Voivodeship), the initial wave of repression of 1939 was rationalized as removal of "social enemies", or "enemies of the people": military, police and administrative personnel, large landowners, industrialists, and merchants. They were usually sentenced to 8–20 years in labor camps. In addition, settlers, or osadniks, as well as foresters and railroad workers were forcibly removed. Massive deportations of the Polish population into remote areas of the Soviet Union took place in 1940–1941. Estimates of the total number of deported Poles vary between 400,000 and 1.9 million people, including prisoner of war.

On 23 June 1940, Lavrenty Beria, head of the NKVD, ordered the Murmansk Oblast to be cleansed of "foreign nationals", which included Scandinavians and all other nationalities. People of Finnish, Swedish, and Norwegian (see also "Kola Norwegians") ethnicities were moved to the Karelo-Finnish SSR. Germans, Koreans, Chinese, and others were moved to Altay.

Deportations of "exiled settlers" from the Baltic States (Lithuanians, Latvians, and Estonians) and the annexed part of Romania (Bessarabia and Northern Bukovina) were carried out in May–June 1941.

After the 1941 German invasion of the Soviet Union, Stalin sought a rapprochement with the West, which included establishing diplomatic relations with the Polish government in exile. As the result, Polish citizens were "amnestied" and freed from "special settlement". Deportations of Polish citizens are commemorated by the Monument to the Fallen and Murdered in the East in Warsaw.

=== "Preventive" deportations of nationalities in 1941–1942 ===
These deportations concerned Soviet citizens of "enemy nationality". The affected were Volga Germans, Finns, Romanians, Italians, and Greeks. At the end of this period, Crimean Tatars were included in this wave of deportation.

=== "Punitive" deportations of nationalities in 1943–1944 ===
These deportations concerned ethnicities declared guilty of cooperation with Nazi occupants: a number of peoples of North Caucasus and Crimea: Chechens, Ingush, Balkars, Karachays, Meskhetian Turks, Crimean Tatars, and Crimean Bolgars, as well as Kalmyks.

=== Post-war deportations ===
Deportations after the end of World War II were not particularly differentiated or classified by "NKVD operations". The affected were people from the territories that were under the administration of the Axis powers: family members of persons accused of loyalty to the Axis administration and of persons who continued resistance to Soviet power, which was classified as "banditism". Some former Ostarbeiters were "filtered" into exile as well. "Cleansing" of the annexed territories continued until the early 1950s. In July 1949, a further 35,000 were deported from Bessarabia and Northern Bukovina, accused of being kulaks or collaborating with the wartime Romanian administration.

Lithuania suffered its heaviest deportation number on the night of May 22, 4 o'clock. Placing people in animal wagons, Stalin deported around 40,000 people, including 10,897 children under the age of 15. The journeys alone took a toll of 5,000 Lithuanian children.

=== Ukazniks ===
The term ukaznik derives from the Russian term "ukaz" that means "decree". It applies to those convicted according to various Soviet ukazes, but the most common usage refers to a series of decrees related to what was later formalized in Soviet law as parasitism, or evasion from socially-useful work. Among the first of these was the decree of 2 June 1942 "On criminal culpability for evasion from socially useful work and for social parasitism in the agricultural sector" (Об ответственности за уклонение от общественно полезного труда и за ведение антиобщественного паразитического образа жизни в сельском хозяйстве). It was usually applied to kolkhozniks who failed to carry out their corvée (trudodni, "labour-days"). The term of exile was 8 years. During 1948–1952 33,266 special settlers ("ukazniks") were registered. Unlike other exile settler categories, children of these exiles were not subject to the Decree.

=== Religious persecution ===
A number of religious groups, such as the Jehovah's Witnesses (свидетели иеговы), True Orthodox Church (истинно-православные христиане), Inochentism (иннокентьевцы) and True and Free Seventh-day Adventists (адвентисты-реформисты) were persecuted by the Soviet Union. In particular, members of these groups refused to join the Young Pioneers, the Komsomol, or to serve in the Soviet Army. Usually members of these groups and especially influential members were subject to criminal law and treated on a case-by-case basis. However, on 3 March 1951, the USSR Council of Ministers issued a decree, "On Expulsion of Active Participants of the anti-Soviet Illegal Sect of Jehovists and their Family Members" (Постановление Совета Министров СССР о выселении активных участников антисоветской нелегальной секты иеговистов и членов их семей No. 1290-467 от 3 марта 1951 года). According to this decree, about 9,400 Jehovah's Witnesses, including about 4,000 children, were resettled from the Baltic States, Moldavia, and western parts of Byelorussia and Ukraine to Siberia in 1951, an event known as "Operation North".

Only in September 1965, a decree of the Presidium of the USSR Council of Ministers canceled the "special settlement" restriction for members of these religious groups.

=== Iranians and Assyrians ===
The above are the major, most populous categories of exile settlers. There were a number of smaller categories. They were small in the scale of the whole Soviet Union, but rather significant in terms of the affected categories of population. For example, in 1950 all Iranians, with the exception of persons of Armenian ethnicity, were resettled from Georgia, a population of some 4,776 persons, and in the same year thousands of Christian ethnic Assyrians were deported from Armenia and Georgia to Kazakhstan.

== Labor settlements ==
Labor settlements (трудопоселение, trudoposelenie) were a method of internal exile that used settlers for obligatory labor. The main category of "labor settlers" (трудопоселенцы, trudoposelentsy) were kulaks and members of their families deported in 1930s before the Great Purge. Labor settlements were under the management of the Gulag, but they must not be confused with labor camps.

The first official document that decreed wide-scale "dekulakization" was a joint decree of Central Executive Committee and Sovnarkom on 1 February 1930. Initially families of kulaks were deported into remote areas "for special settlement" without particular care about their occupation. In 1931–1932 the problems of dekulakization and territorial planning of the exile settlement were handled by a special Politburo commission known as the Andreev-Rudzutak Commission (комиссия Андреева-Рудзутака), named after Andrey Andreyevich Andreyev and Yan Rudzutak. The plan to achieve goals like exploitation of natural resources and the colonization of remote areas with "special settlements" instead of labor camps was dropped after the revelation of the Nazino affair in 1933; subsequently the Gulag system was expanded.

The notions of "labor settlement"/"labor settlers" were introduced in 1934 and were in official use until 1945. Since 1945, the terminology was unified, and exiled kulaks were documented as "special resettlers – kulaks".

== "Free settlements" ==
Free settlements (вольное поселение, volnoye poselenie) were for persons released from the confines of labor camps "for free settlement" before their term expiration, as well as for those who served the full term, but remained restricted in their choice of place of residence. These people were known as free settlers (вольнопоселенцы, volnoposelentsy). The term was in use earlier, in Imperial Russia, in two meanings: free settlement of peasants or cossacks (in the sense of being free from serfdom) and non-confined exile settlement (e.g., after serving a katorga term).

In the Soviet Union, a decree of Sovnarkom of 1929 about labor camps said, in part:

For gradual colonization of the regions where concentration camps are to be established, suggest the OGPU and Narkomat of Justice to urgently plan activities based on the following principles: (1) <to transfer the convicts of good behavior to free settlement ahead of term> (2) <to leave the convicts served full term but restricted in residence, for settlement and supply them with land> (3) <to allow the settlement of released convicts volunteered to stay>.

The "free settlers" of the first category were often required to do the work assigned to the corresponding labor camp or some other obligatory work. Later, people could be assigned for "free settlement" in other places as well, even in towns, with obligatory work wherever a workforce was required.

== Population statistics ==
After the dissolution of the Soviet Union the researchers gained access to the archives of the NKVD. Data on 1 January 1953 show 2,753,356 "deported and special settlers". Dmitri Volkogonov, in his book about Stalin, quoted an MVD document that reports 2,572,829 on 1 January 1950.

In Lithuania alone around 131,600 people were banished along with 156,000 sent to gulags.

== See also ==
- 101st kilometre
- Deportation of Romanians in the Soviet Union
- Forced labor of Germans in the Soviet Union
- Gulag: Colonization
- Human rights in the Soviet Union
- Penal transportation
- Persecution of Christians in the Soviet Union
- ZATO

== Bibliography ==
1. Павел Полян, Не по своей воле... (Pavel Polian, Against Their Will... A History and Geography of Forced Migrations in the USSR), ОГИ Мемориал, Moscow, 2001, ISBN 5-94282-007-4
2. V.N. Zemskov, Inmates, Special Settlers, Exile Settlers, Exiled and Evicted (Statistical-Geographical Aspect). In: History of the USSR, 1991, no.5, pp. 151–165. (in Russian)
3. Ioniţoiu, Cicerone, Genocidul din România, Repere în procesul comunismului (in Romanian)
4. International Socialism Journal, "Forced migration in 20th century Balkans ", 1995
5. Lynne Viola, The Unknown Gulag: The Lost World of Stalin's Special Settlements, Oxford University Press (2007) ISBN 0-19-518769-5

== Wikisource ==
- A decree about labor camps, 1919, in Russian
- A decree about penal labor, 1929, in Russian
