= Against Their Will (Polyan book) =

2001 book by Pavel Markovitsj Poljan

Against Their Will... The History and Geography of Forced Migrations in the USSR
- Book cover: Joseph Stalin's arm, holding his famous pipe, casually herds people
- Author: Pavel Polyan
- Publication date: 2001

Against Their Will... The History and Geography of Forced Migrations in the USSR is a historical research book by Pavel Polyan (2001), published by the Memorial society. It is the first comprehensive study of all massive-scale forced migrations within the Soviet Union. The book is based on published materials and archival data made public. It contains numerous summary tables.

The book covers forced migrations of Soviet citizens within the Soviet Union, as well as forced migrations of foreign citizens into the Soviet Union. Polyan systematized previously published sources, scattered over various publications, and supplemented them with archival materials. The book uncovered the logic of these migrations.

== Publication ==
- Павел Полян (2001). Не по своей воле...История и география принудительных миграций в СССР (Pavel Polyan, Not of Their Own Will... A History and Geography of Forced Migrations in the USSR). ОГИ Мемориал, Moscow, 2001. ISBN 5-94282-007-4.
- Pavel Polian (January 2004). Against Their Will: The History and Geography of Forced Migrations in the USSR. Central European University Press, 2004. ISBN 978-963-9241-68-8.
