= Pavel Polian =

Russian geographer and historian

- Павел Полян
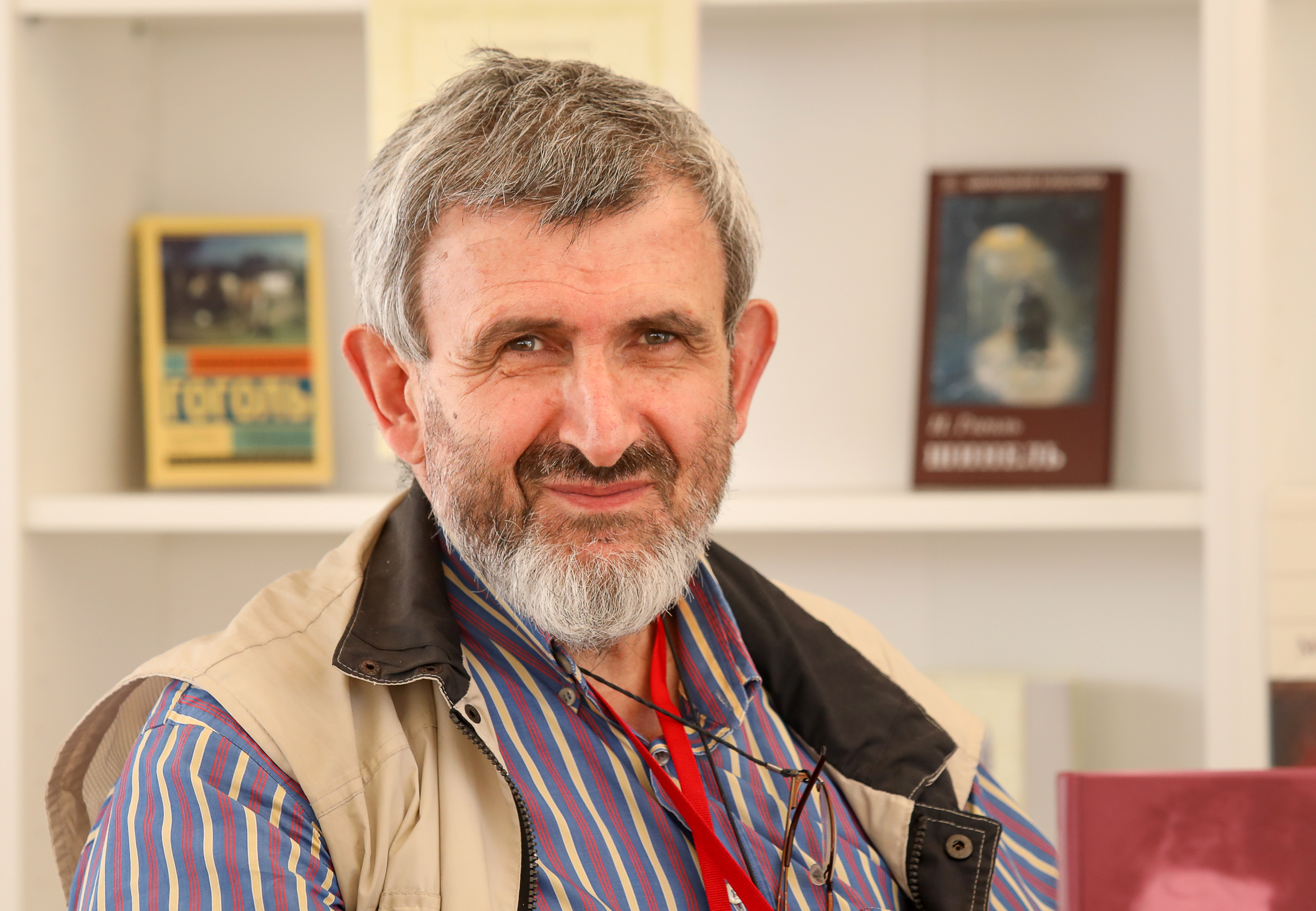
- Polian in 2019
- Born: August 31, 1952 (age 74); Moscow Soviet Union
- Education: Moscow State University
- Occupations: Geographer, historian, sociologist
- Scientific career
- Academic advisors: Georgy Lappo

Pavel Markovich Polian (Russian: Павел Маркович Полян; born 31 August 1952), pseudonym: Pavel Nerler, is a Russian geographer and historian, and Doctor of Geographical Sciences with the Institute of Geography (1998) of the Russian Academy of Sciences. He authored over 300 publications and is most known for his research on the history and geography of forced migrations.

Polian is director of the Mandelshtam Center at the National Research University Higher School of Economics.

== Brief bibliography ==
- Polian, Pavel (2002). Жертвы двух диктатур: Жизнь, труд, унижение и смерть советских военнопленных и остарбайтеров на чужбине и на родине [Victims of Two Dictatorships: The Life, Work, Humiliation, and Death of Soviet Prisoners of War and Ostarbeiter in Foreign Lands and in the Motherland] (in Russian) (2-е изд. ed.). Мoscow: РОССПЭН. p. 896. ISBN 5-8243-0130-1.
- Westarbeiters. Interned Germans in the USSR (Prehistory, History, Geography). – "Вестарбайтеры". Интернированные немцы в СССР (предыстория, история, география) / Учебное пособие для спецкурса. Ставрополь—Москва: Изд-во СГУ, 1999. 48 pp; Вестарбайтеры. Интернированные немцы на советских стройках // Родина. 1999. No. 9. pp. 21–25; (in Russian) (the title is a pun with "Ostarbeiter")
- Павел Полян (2001). Не по своей воле...История и география принудительных миграций в СССР (Pavel Polyan, Not by Their Own Will... A History and Geography of Forced Migrations in the USSR). ОГИ Мемориал, Moscow, 2001. ISBN 5-94282-007-4.
  - English translation: Pavel Polian (January 2004). Against Their Will: The History and Geography of Forced Migrations in the USSR. Central European University Press, 2004. ISBN 978-963-9241-68-8.
- Свитки из пепла. Еврейская “зондеркоммандо” в Аушвице-Биркенау и ее летописцы (Scrolls from the Ashes. Jewish "Sonderkommando" at Auschwitz-Birkenau and its Chroniclers), 2014
- (editor, with N.L. Pobol) Сталинские депортации, 1928–1953
- Обреченные погибнуть. Судьба советских военнопленных-евреев во Второй мировой войне. Воспоминания и документы
- Отрицание отрицания, или Битва под Аушвицем: дебаты о демографии и геополитике холокоста
