= Haikara =

Haikara may refer to:

- Haikara (fashion) (ハイカラ, wasei-eigo from "high collar") a Japanese Europeanized fashion style in the Meiji period
- Haikara, a 2001 single by Gentouki
- Jason Haikara, American businessman
- Agnessa Haikara (born 1979), Russian lawyer, sociologist, and writer
