= HMS Blackcock =

British naval vessel

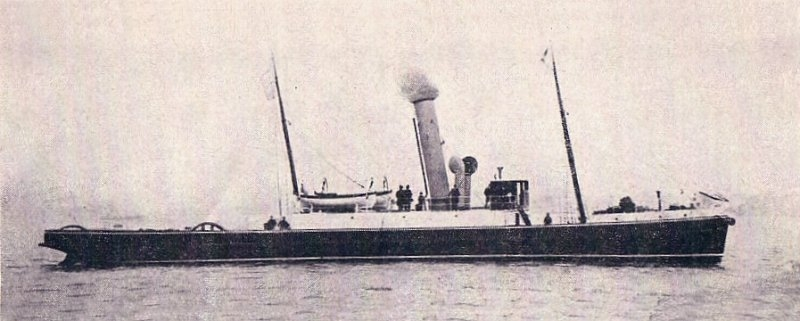
- Blackcock prior to WWI

History

United Kingdom
- Name: HMS Blackcock
- Builder: Laird Brothers Ltd. of Birkenhead
- Commissioned: 1885
- Fate: Ran aground near Tsypnavolok 18 January 1918, later crushed by ice

General characteristics
- Type: Tugboat
- Tonnage: 254 GRT
- Length: 146 ft 2 in (44.55 m)
- Beam: 21 ft 0 in (6.40 m)
- Propulsion: 1,200 ihp (895 kW) 3-cylinder triple expansion coal-fired steam engine
- Notes: YN 534. 49 NRT. ON 91283

HMS Blackcock was a tugboat which was operated by the Royal Navy during World War I. While on a mission it ran aground near Tsypnavolok, Russia, on 18 January 1918. It had to be abandoned and it was later thought to have been crushed by ice.

== History ==
The ship was built in 1885 by famed shipbuilders Laird Brothers Ltd of Birkenhead and delivered to the Liverpool company Liverpool Screw Towing & Lighterage Co Ltd.

At the outbreak of World War I the ship was hired by the British Royal Navy on 11 August 1914 and was later purchased outright on 4 November 1915.

In 1915 the Blackcock along with five other tugboats (Liverpool's Sarah Joliffe and T. A. Joliffe, and Danube II, Southampton and Revenger from the Thames fleet) were ordered to tow the naval monitors HMS Severn and HMS Mersey from the UK to the Rufiji River delta in German East Africa. There the two warships assisted in the destruction of the German light cruiser Königsberg. Though lightly armed, the tugs were ready to assist. They were not called upon, but according to Commander in Chief, Vice-Admiral Herbert King-Hall, the example the tugs "set was most praiseworthy."

On 17 January 1918 the ship, commanded by Lieutenant Robert Weir, set off on a mission to deliver supplies and passengers from Vardø, Norway to Murmansk, Russia. The next morning at 07:45 on 18 January 1918 (Note: List of Admiralty Records shows the ship loss on 28 January 1918 and the "Adm Ref: Admiralty 28 Feb 1918") the ship ran aground and started to take on water. Lifeboats were dropped and all the passengers and some of the crew were taken to the shore. They walked along the shore through very difficult weather until they reached the community of Tsypnavolok. At the town a rescue party made up of dog sleds returned to the tug and got the rest of the crew. There were no deaths but some of the crew and passengers suffered frostbite. The tug was abandoned and later believed to have been crushed in the ice and lost.

== Bibliography ==
Notes

References

- King-Hall, Herbert (1915). "Destruction of German cruiser "Königsberg" – Naval Despatch". London Gazette Naval Dispatch No. 29395. ISSN 0374-3721. OCLC 6672113.
- naval-history.net (9 January 2009). "British Naval Vessels lost at sea, Abadol (oiler) to Lynx (destroyer)". naval-history.net/.
- The National Archives (United Kingdom) (2018). "Loss of Tug BLACKCOCK – Reference: ADM 137/3725". The National Archives.
- Public Record Office, FIRSTNAME (1974). List of Admiralty Records: Accounting departments. Kraus Reprint Corporation.
- Thames Tugs (2007). "The Tugs". Thames Tugs.
- Yates, Keith (1995). Graf Spee's Raiders: Challenge to the Royal Navy, 1914–1915. Naval Institute Press. ISBN 9781557509772. - Total pages: 336
