= Zubovskaya Bay =

Bay of the Barents Sea, Russia

Coordinates: 69°48′N 32°35′E

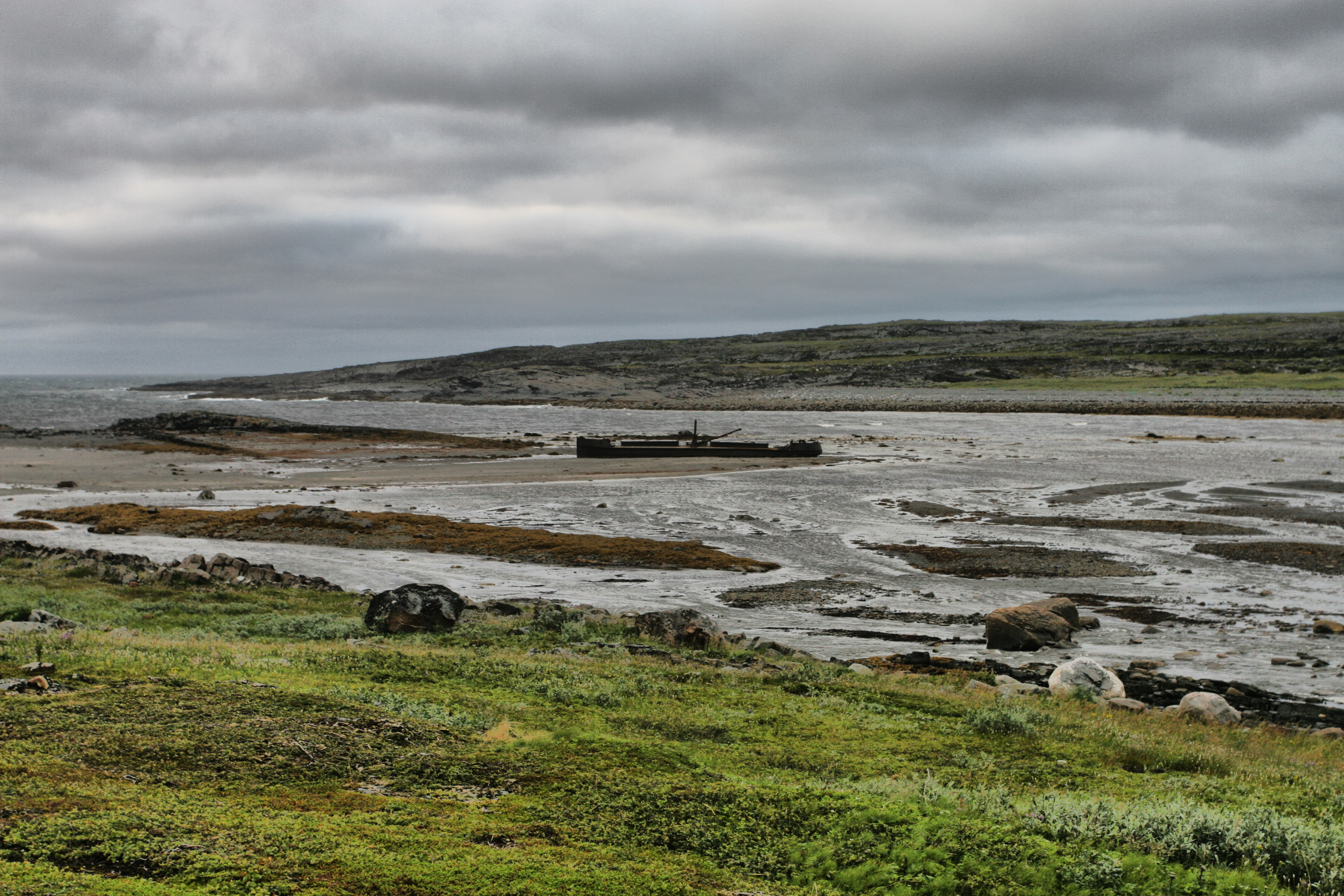

Zubovskaya Bay (Russian: Зубовская губа) is a bay on the northern coast of the Rybachy Peninsula, itself on the northeastern coast of the Kola Peninsula, Murmansk Oblast, Russia. It opens into the Barents Sea, and shares its name with the abandoned village of Zubovka.
