= Kola Norwegians =

Ethnic group in Russia

Kola Norwegians Kolanordmenn Кольские норвежцы
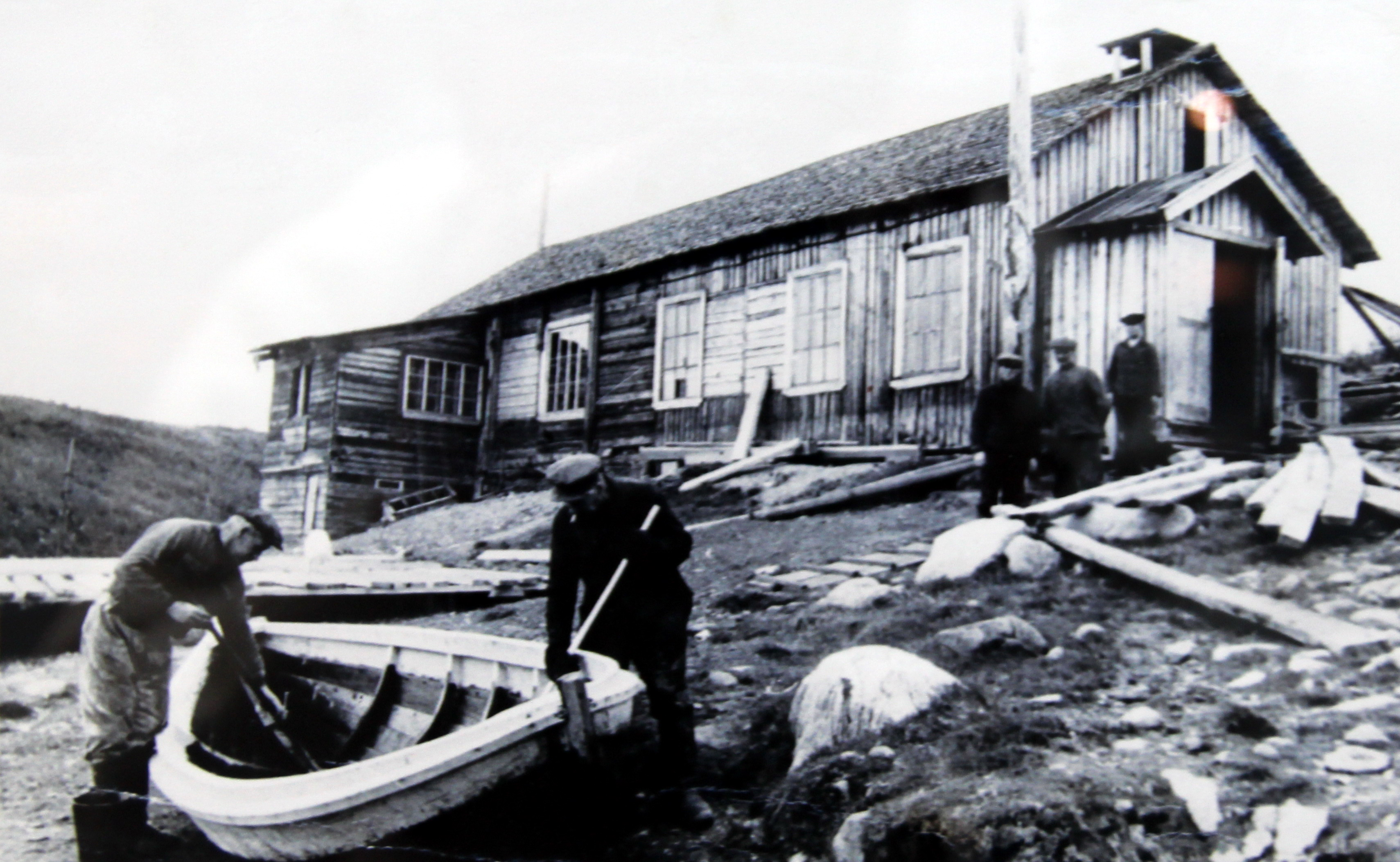

Total population
- 220 (1895) / c. 150-200 (1910)

Languages
- Russian, Norwegian

Religion
- Lutheranism

Related ethnic groups
- Norwegians

The Kola Norwegians (Norwegian: Kolanordmenn) are Norwegian people who settled along the coastline of the Kola Peninsula in Russia.

== History ==
In 1860 the Russian Tsar Alexander II granted permission for Norwegian settlements on the Kola peninsula. Around 1870, scores of families from Finnmark in northern Norway departed for the Murman Coast, attracted by the prospects of fishing and trade. The Russian authorities granted them privileges to trade with Norway.

Most of them settled in Tsyp-Navolok on the easternmost tip of the Rybachiy Peninsula (Полуостров Рыбачий; Norwegian: Fiskerhalvøya – both terms meaning "Fishermen's Peninsula"). Others settled in Vayda-Guba at the northwestern tip – Cape Nemetskiy (мыс Немецкий, "Cape German") – of the same peninsula. A vibrant society developed while retaining contact with Norway, especially with the town of Vardø. Some settlers returned to Norway shortly after the Russian Revolution of 1917, but most of them remained at Tsyp-Navolok.

On 23 June 1940, Lavrenty Beria of the NKVD ordered the Murmansk Oblast, encompassing the entire Kola Peninsula, to be cleaned of "foreign nationals". As a result, the entire Norwegian population was deported for resettlement in the Karelo-Finnish SSR. Soon they had to move from there too, because of pressures caused by the Finnish invasion of the Soviet Union in 1941, so they were moved further away from the borders: to Arkhangelsk Oblast.

Despite many having served in the Red Army, they were not allowed to return home to the Kola peninsula after the end of the Second World War. Many children were raised without learning to speak Norwegian.

== Recent history ==
After 1992, some descendants of the original settlers began to emphasize their family backgrounds, although only a few had been able to maintain a rusty knowledge of the Vardø dialect of the Norwegian language. Some have now migrated to Norway. There are special provisions in Norwegian immigration law which ease this process, albeit generally being less permissive than those which pertain in other countries which operate a "right of return". In order to obtain a permit to move to Norway and work there, a foreign citizen must show an adequate connection to the country, such as having two or more grandparents who were born there. Descendants of Kola Norwegians are eligible for Norwegian citizenship after one year of living in Norway with a residence permit. By 2004, approximately 200 Kola Norwegians had settled in Norway.

In 2007, the small village of Port-Vladimir, the last stronghold of the Kola Norwegians lost its official recognition due to depopulation.

Only 98 individuals identified themselves as Norwegians in the 2010 census of Russia, including 20 in Saint Petersburg, 11 in Murmansk Oblast, and 4 in Karelia. The 2021 Russian census recorded 112 citizens who claimed to be ethnic Norwegians, not specifying them by region. 67 individuals stated in 2021 that Norwegian is their native language, including 15 in Moscow, 12 in Murmansk Oblast, 11 in Saint Petersburg, and just 1 in Krasnodar Krai.

== See also ==
- Population transfer in the Soviet Union
- Russenorsk, an extinct Russo-Norwegian pidgin
- Pomors, coastal Russian settlers
- Bjarmaland
- Murmansk Finns
