= Murmansk Finns =

Ethnic group in Russia

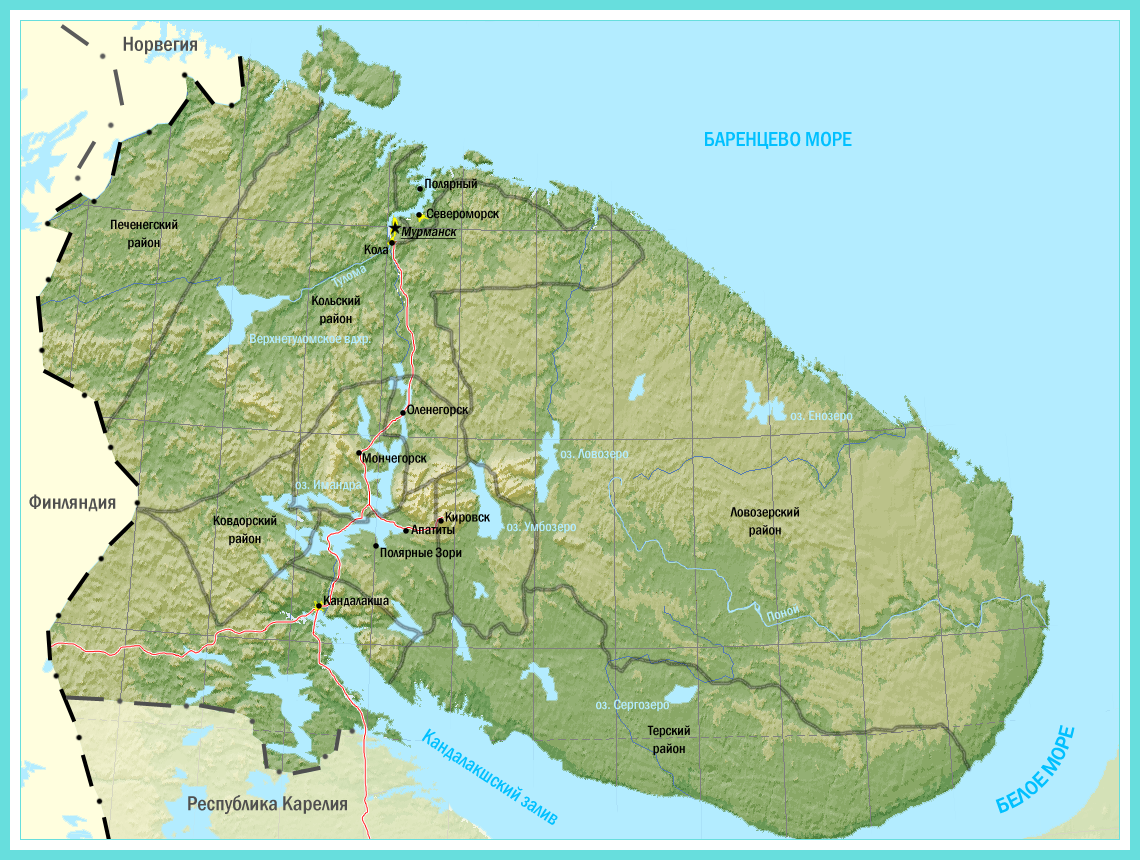

Total population
- 273

Languages
- Russian, Finnish

Religion
- Lutheranism

Related ethnic groups
- Finnish people, Ingrian Finns, Kvens

Murmansk Finns or Kola Finns (Finnish: Muurmanninsuomalaiset, Kuolansuomalaiset) are a group of Finns who live or lived in Murmansk Oblast. They came to Murmansk around 1860 during the Finnish famine of 1866–68. However, there was another immigration period in 1900, due to the building of the Kirov Railway. In 2010, there were 273 Finns living in Murmansk.

== History ==
Around the end of the Tsardom era, there were about 40 villages or towns where Murmansk Finns lived. In 1920, when Petsamo was given to Finland, many Murmansk Finns moved to Petsamo. However, two thirds of Murmansk Finns stayed in Soviet Russia. In 1931, a Finnish national district was established in the area, see Polyarny District.

During the Stalin era, the Murmansk Finns were heavily persecuted, often being accused of espionage. The last Murmansk Finnish villages were emptied in 1940, when 6,973 "citizens of foreign nationalities" (Finns, Norwegians, Estonians, Latvians, Lithuanians, and Swedes) were deported. Survivor, artist, and writer Sven Lokka describes the experience of Murmansk Finns in his books.

Agnessa Haikara wrote a documentary book "Неизвестная северная история" (Unknown Northern History) about the persecution of 210 Murmansk Finns and Kola Norwegians (printed in Finnish as Kuka koputtaa ovellesi?, "Who is Knocking at Your Door?"), for which Haikara was accused of "encitement of ethnic hatred".

== See also ==
- Finnish Operation of the NKVD
