= Zubovka, Murmansk Oblast =

Abolished inhabited locality in Murmansk Oblast, Russia

Coordinates: 69°46′00″N 32°37′59″E

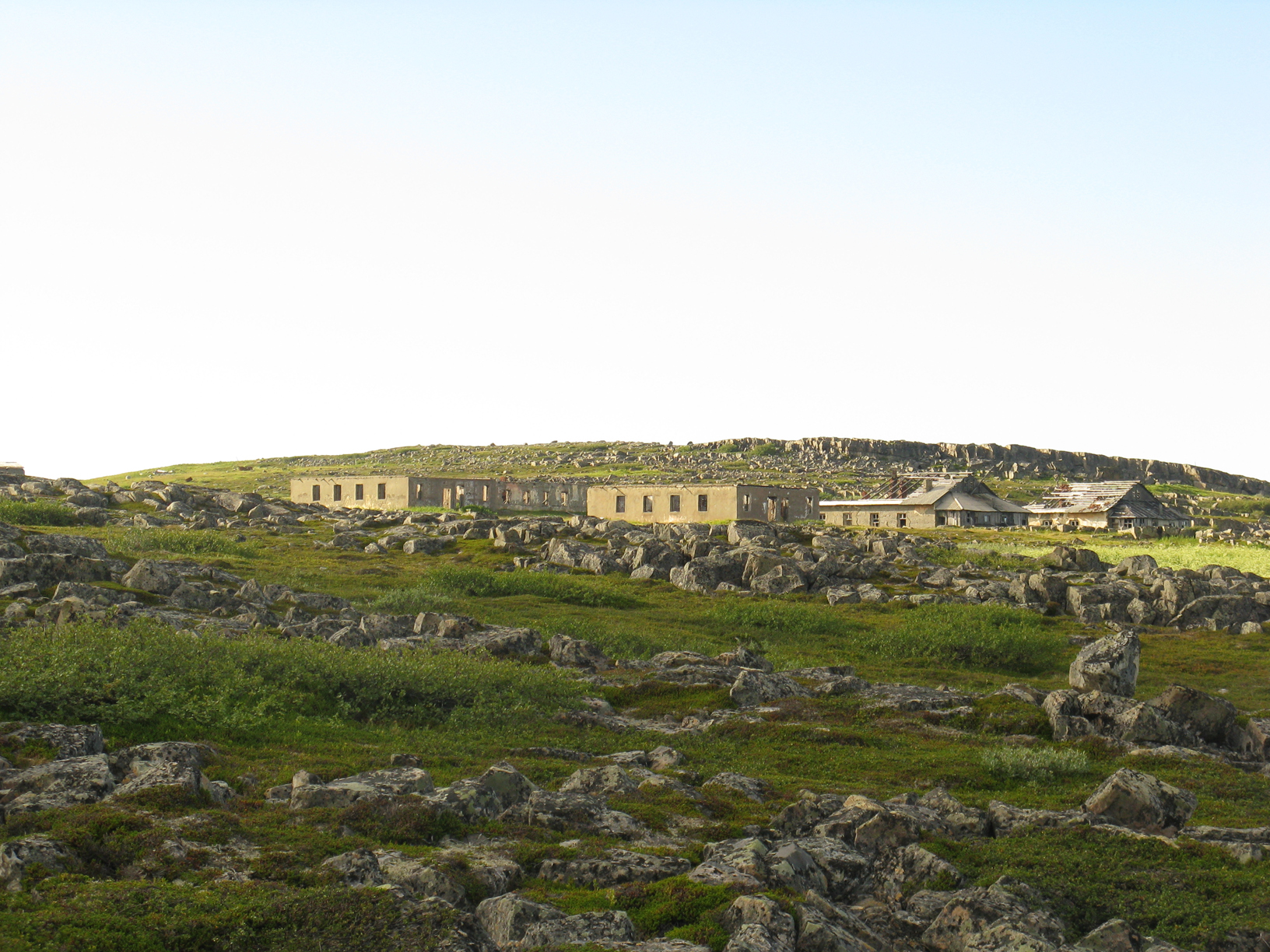
Ruins of Zubovka

Zubovka (Russian: Зубовка) was a rural locality (an inhabited locality) under the administrative jurisdiction of the urban-type settlement of Pechenga in Pechengsky District of Murmansk Oblast, Russia. It was abolished in December 2009 due to depopulation.

It was located by and gives its name to Zubovskaya Bay, beyond the Arctic Circle at a height of 22 meters (72 ft) above sea level.
