= Sven Lokka =

Russian Finnish painter and writer (1924–2008)

Sven Lokka, pen name Oskar Talvi (Russian: Свен Петрович Ло́кко, Sven Petrovich Lokko) ( March 3, 1924 – November 15, 2008) was a Soviet and Russian Finnish writer and painter.

He lost his father during the Great Purge. During the Winter War, he, together with other "foreign nationals", was forcibly resettled from Murmansk Oblast to Karelia during the Soviet campaign of cleansing the border regions of undesirables. In his books he described the experience of Murmansk Finns.

He was one of the three persons presented in the documentary Historian unohtamat – tarina Muurmannin rannan viimeisistä suomalaisista (Forgotten by history - the story of the last Finns on the Murmansk coast)

== Works ==
- Lapin lämpöä suonissa, Karjala-kustantamo, 1983
- Kaamos ja valo, Karjala-kustantamo, 1991
- Muurmannin suomalaiset, 1993
- Missä on muuttolinnun kotimaa, 1999 ISBN 952-91-1430-3
- Kun muuttolintu ei palaa, Levin sanomat, 2006
- Muistoja Muurmannilta, Lapin maakuntamuseo, 2008 ISBN 978-951-98439-1-9
