= Agnessa Haikara =

Russian lawyer, activist and writer (born 1979)

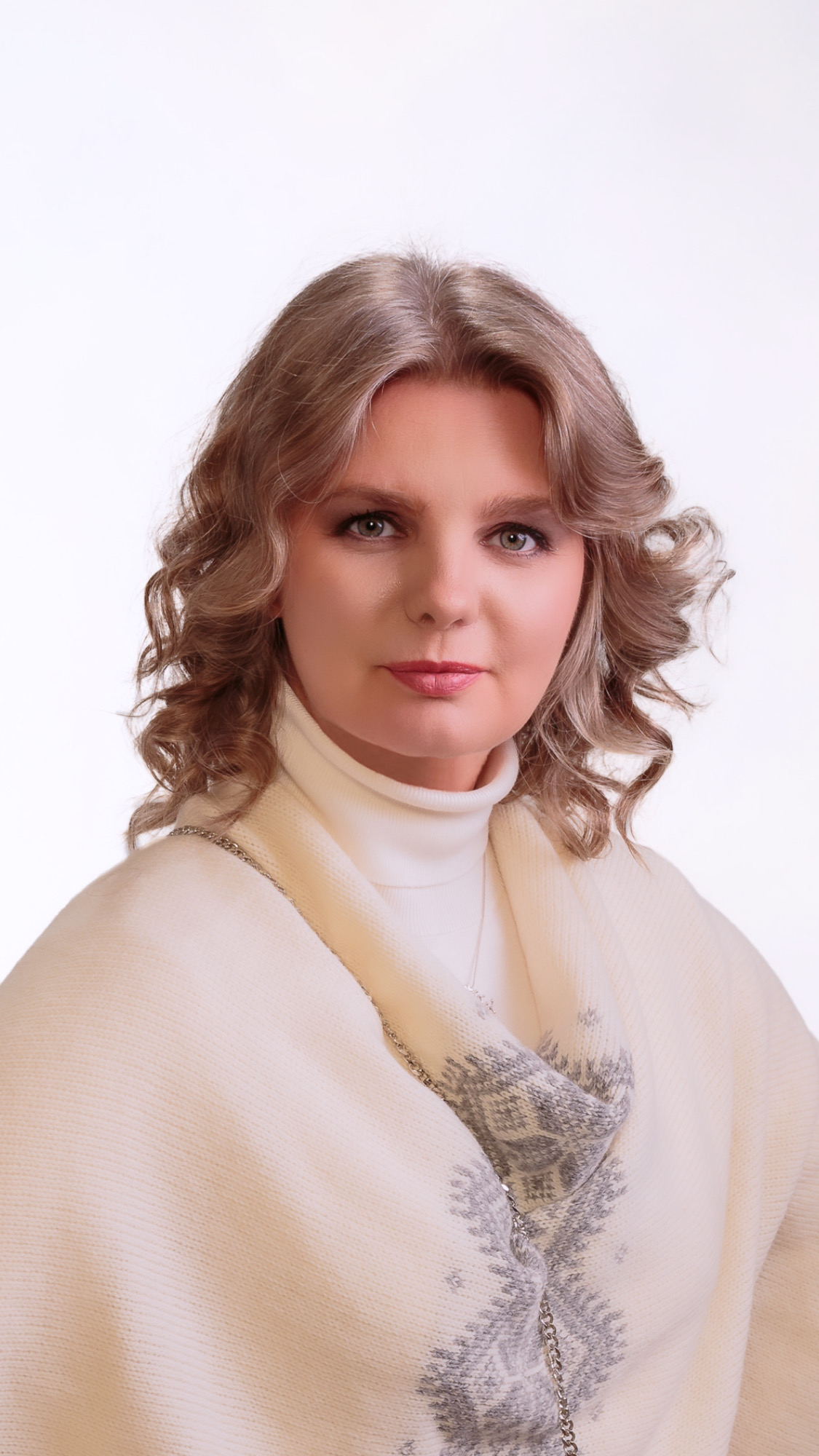
Agnessa Haikara, 2020

Agnessa Haikara (Note: see wikt:haikara for the meaning of the surname), also Agnessa Haykara (Russian: Агнесса Рикхартовна Хайкара, romanized: Agnessa Rikhartovna Khaykara) (born September 1979) is a Russian lawyer and sociologist, public and political activist, and writer, best known for her documentary book about Murmansk Finns and Kola Norwegians repressed in the Soviet Union. She is a member of the Communist Party of the Russian Federation.

== Early life and education ==
She was born in Murmansk to a family of Finnish origin.

In 2007, she graduated from Murmansk State Technical University.

== Career ==
For 17 years, she worked as a civil servant as Murmansk regional duma from 2004 to 2021.

She wrote a nonfiction book "Неизвестная северная история О трагических судьбах кольских финнов и норвежцев, подвергшихся политическим репрессиям" (Unknown Northern History. About the tragic fates of the Kola Finns and Norwegians who were subjected to political repression) about the persecution of 210 Murmansk Finns and Kola Norwegians (printed in Finnish as Kuka koputtaa ovellesi?, Who is Knocking at Your Door?, translated by Pekka Iivari, in 2023).

The 2020 Russian print of the book was confiscated by the Federal Security Service right from the printing house and Haikara was accused of "incitement of ethnic hatred". Her advocate insisted that the experts on whose opinion accusation was based were lacking competence, and the second expertise performed in 2022 refuted their findings. According to Russian political scientist Aleksandr Kynev, Haikara's case follows the trend in Putin's Russia to suppress information about persecutions under Stalin.

Haikara traveled to Finland in August 2020 for research purposes before the FSS raided her publisher. She was informed of the raid in December of that same year. FSS denied the seizure of the books, and because Haikara had a contract to deliver 25 copies to the Ministry of Culture of the Murmansk region, the ministry accused her of the breach of contract. Fearing prosecution, she did not return to Russia and continued to work on her book while staying in Lahti.

As of 2024 she lives in Rovaniemi and is doing her Ph.D. as a junior researcher at the Faculty of Social Sciences, University of Lapland.
