= Japanese clothing during the Meiji period =

History of Japanese clothing throughout the Meiji period

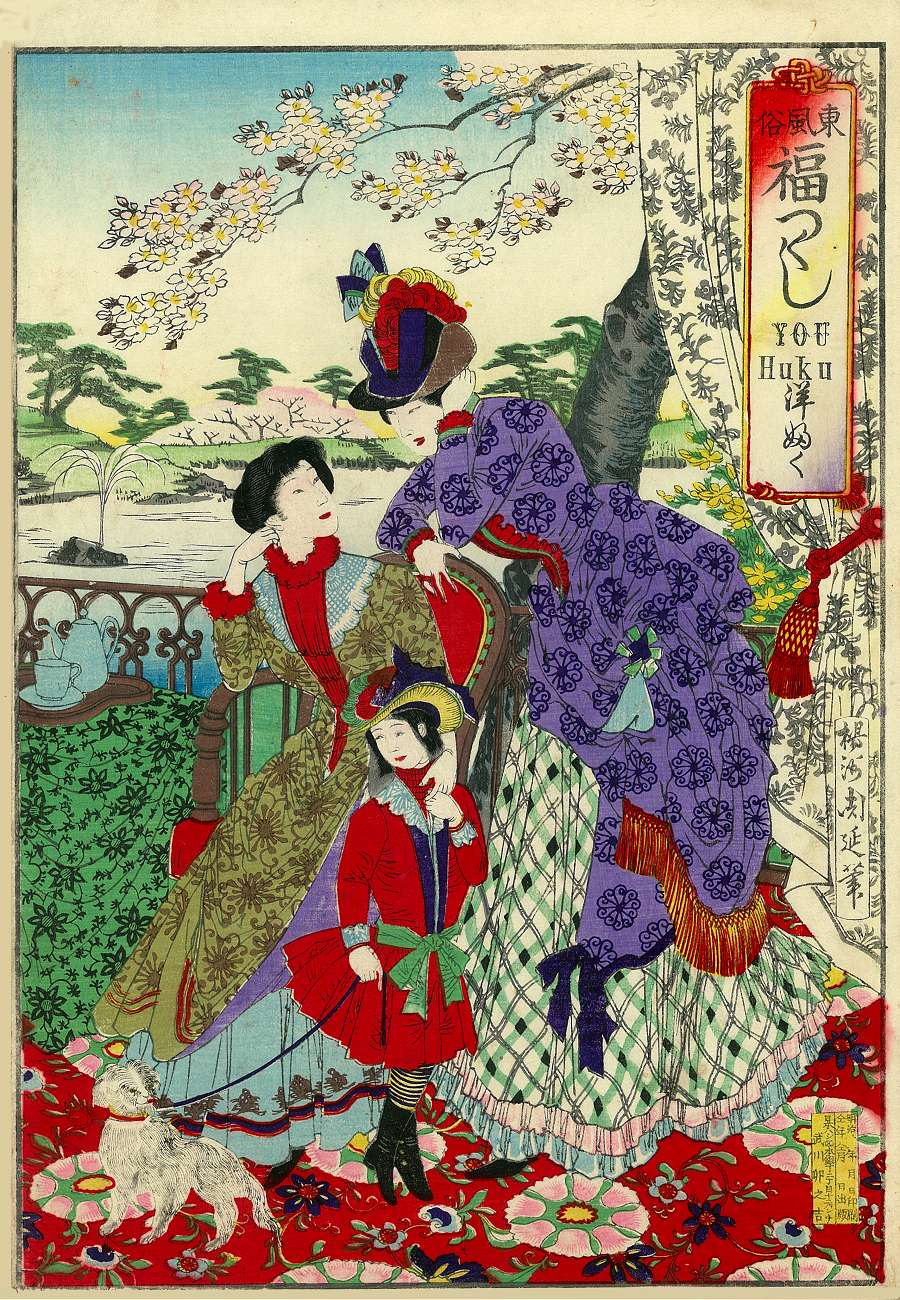
A woodblock print by Yōshū Chikanobu showing Japanese women in Western-style clothes, hats, and shoes (yōfuku)

Japanese clothing during the Meiji period (1867–1912) saw a marked change from the preceding Edo period (1603–1867), following the final years of the Tokugawa shogunate between 1853 and 1867, the Convention of Kanagawa in 1854 – which, led by Matthew C. Perry, forcibly opened Japanese ports to American vessels, thus ending Japan's centuries-long policy of isolation – and the Meiji Restoration in 1868, which saw the feudal shogunate dismantled in favour of a Western-style modern empire.

During the Meiji period, Western-style fashion (yōfuku) was first adopted most widely by Japanese men in uniformed, governmental or otherwise official roles, as part of a drive towards industrialisation and a perception of modernity. Western-style uniform was first introduced as a part of government uniform in 1872, and quickly became associated with elitism, modernity, and money.

The Western trends adopted by the government were not popular with the public at large. While those in employed in the Imperial court, office workers and factory workers wore Western dress at work, many still chose to wear kimono and other traditional Japanese clothing (wafuku) at home. The transition to Western-style clothing throughout wider Japanese society happened gradually, with a significant degree of resistance. This transition came to be referred to as three, distinctive periods: Bunmei kaika (1868–1883), the Rokumeikan (1883–1890s), and an unnamed period of nativist revival afterwards in the 1890s. The Bunmei kaika period was a period wherein Western products were adopted quickly, and were mixed with elements of yōfuku, such as Western-style shoes and hats being worn by men when wearing kimono. During the Rokumeikan period, Western culture grew in popularity, and a number of clothing reforms including a Westernised system of dress. Two decades into the Meiji period, it became increasingly hard to find men with uncropped, chonmage-style hair and women with blackened teeth, styles mostly relegated to rural areas.

Following the Rokumeikan period, due to a proliferation of Western dress over two decades, a single piece of yōfuku no longer served the purpose of distinguishing someone as modern and progressive. In the final stage of the Meiji period, during the 1890s, popular culture and clothing saw a callback to nativism, in which the kimono re-established itself as the primary dress of the Japanese people, with Western-style clothing mostly relegated to formal roles, uniforms, and men in positions of power or obligation of dress. Women, having always been slower to adopt Western dress than men, continued to wear the kimono as fashionable and everyday clothing, and did not adopt Western clothing as everyday dress to nearly the same degree as Japanese men. During this time, the kimono continued to evolve as a fashionable garment, and would evolve the formalised predecessors of modern types of kimono for women during the following Taishō period (1912–1926).

== Fashion trends ==
At the beginning of the Meiji period, some women did adopt Western fashion, but were relatively few and far between, as all Western-style clothing was imported from Western sources. In contrast, many men in Japan at the time were required to start wearing Western-style uniforms to work, beginning with government officials in 1871; by the end of the decade, students in public universities were required to wear Western clothing, along with businessmen, teachers, doctors, bankers, nurses, and other jobs.

Western-style clothing came to represent elitism or class in the Meiji period, alongside the use of aniline dyes, particularly purple and red, the first two synthetic dyes ever created, which had previously been associated with high class status; these dyes became seen as both the colour of "progress" and as symbolism of one's support for the Empire. Though the poorest could still not afford to wear these flashy, high-status colours, those at the bottom of society also began to wear Western uniforms. Though those working practical jobs often wore tube-sleeved hanten jackets, or else tied their kimono sleeves back with tasuki cords, the sleeves on kimono were considered an impractical safety hazard when working on machinery in factories, driving the switch towards Western clothing. In 1873, uniforms were introduced with hakama as well.

In the early Meiji period, Western clothing was expensive, and was worn only by the richest in society. Wool had to be imported, and tailors familiar with the construction of Western clothing were difficult to find. It was more common, therefore, to wear some pieces of Western-style clothing instead of a whole outfit. Shappos (based on the French chapeau, 'hat'), along with a Western-style umbrella, were accessories commonly worn; for those with more money, leather shoes and watches were stylish contributions too.

In 1877, the Satsuma Rebellion, led by Saigō Takamori from the southern domain of Satsuma, came to an end, following the death of Saigō at the Battle of Shiroyama. A revolt led by disaffected samurai against the new Imperial government, though the revolt lasted less than a year, Saigō was branded a noble, if tragic, hero by those sympathetic to his cause; in turn, people started wearing an ikat-woven indigo and white pattern named satsuma kasuri. Saigō "peasant dress" became popular in Tokyo, and an olive brown colour previously known as uguisu-cha was renamed saigō-brown in his memory.

During the late 1870s to 1880s, wool became popular. In 1898 alone, the consumption of wool in Japan reached 3,000,000 yards (2,700,000 m), imported entirely from England and Germany. Wool quickly became commonly used in winter clothing, a marked change from previous years, where clothing was layered to protect from the cold. Kimono overcoats were introduced, with various types known as tombi, niuimawashi, and azumakoto, all commonly made of wool. Also during the winter, women began to wear blankets over their shoulders, and by the end of the 1880s, red blankets had become fashionable.

In 1881, a Japanese artsian named Okajima Chiyozo created a technique of printing designs onto muslin. These became increasingly popular, and were known as yūzen muslins, after the hand-painted dye technique, with women using red or purple muslins for their haori and obi.

During the 1880s, the use of Western clothing in Japan became more complex, with the wearing of a single Western accessory no longer impressive enough as a mark of one's progressiveness. Despite this change, people still continued wearing kimono at home; during this time, the type of clothing one might wear in society evolved to change based on one's activity and location. Western clothing came to be seen as workwear, worn in situations where Western-style chairs and desks were present, whereas Japanese clothing was worn in the home, where tatami mats were dominant. There was an aphorism that noted if there was a chair (common in more Western-style settings), yōfuku was appropriate, whereas wafuku was for sitting on the floor. Japanese clothing became leisurewear, with Western styles become standard in the public sphere. However, as this fashion structure developed, women's clothing began to revert to back to traditional Japanese clothing; outside of high-status women who wore Western dress such as the Empress, members of the high nobility and the wives of officials, the kimono had re-established its place as everyday clothing for women unlikely to hold jobs or status requiring Western uniform in the same fashion as men.

In the 1890s, nativism grew stronger in Japan, and Western clothing likewise became less popular, with rules for Western-style dress growing lax for public events. The kimono became popular again as a marker of native pride, and people started wearing Japanese dress to events, though not to parties. During this period, it was considered disdainful for women to wear Western clothing.

By the end of the Meiji period in 1912, it became apparent that the influx of Western clothing, and the ideas of what a progressive, modern Japan looked like, had affected everyday and fashionable clothing at a deeper level than just that of the clothing people chose to wear. Ceremonial and auspicious colours, which had once been white, gold, silver and scarlet for weddings, had now changed to just white; for funerals, close family members previously wore white while others wore black, but now, everyone wore black.

=== Coats ===
Overcoats were one of the many ways in which a piece of Western clothing could be added to an outfit. Coats and jackets existed previous to Western influences, but with new imported textiles, the number of varieties increased greatly. There were new coats known as tombi, sleeveless cloaks with an attached cape, to be worn over the baggy kimono sleeves; niuimawashi; and azumakoto, all made of wool. By the 1880s, women started wearing azuma coats, a rising fashionable article.

=== Scarves ===
One popular article of Western clothing was the erimaki (collar-winder), a scarf worn over the kimono. The white toweru (towel) was also used as a scarf early on, but vanished once people learned it was an article used to dry one's body. Men particularly adopted the white silk crepe erimaki, which was looped around the neck many times. In the 1880s, square plaid shawls became popular too. Men wore shawls both over kimono and business suits.

=== Hair and hats ===
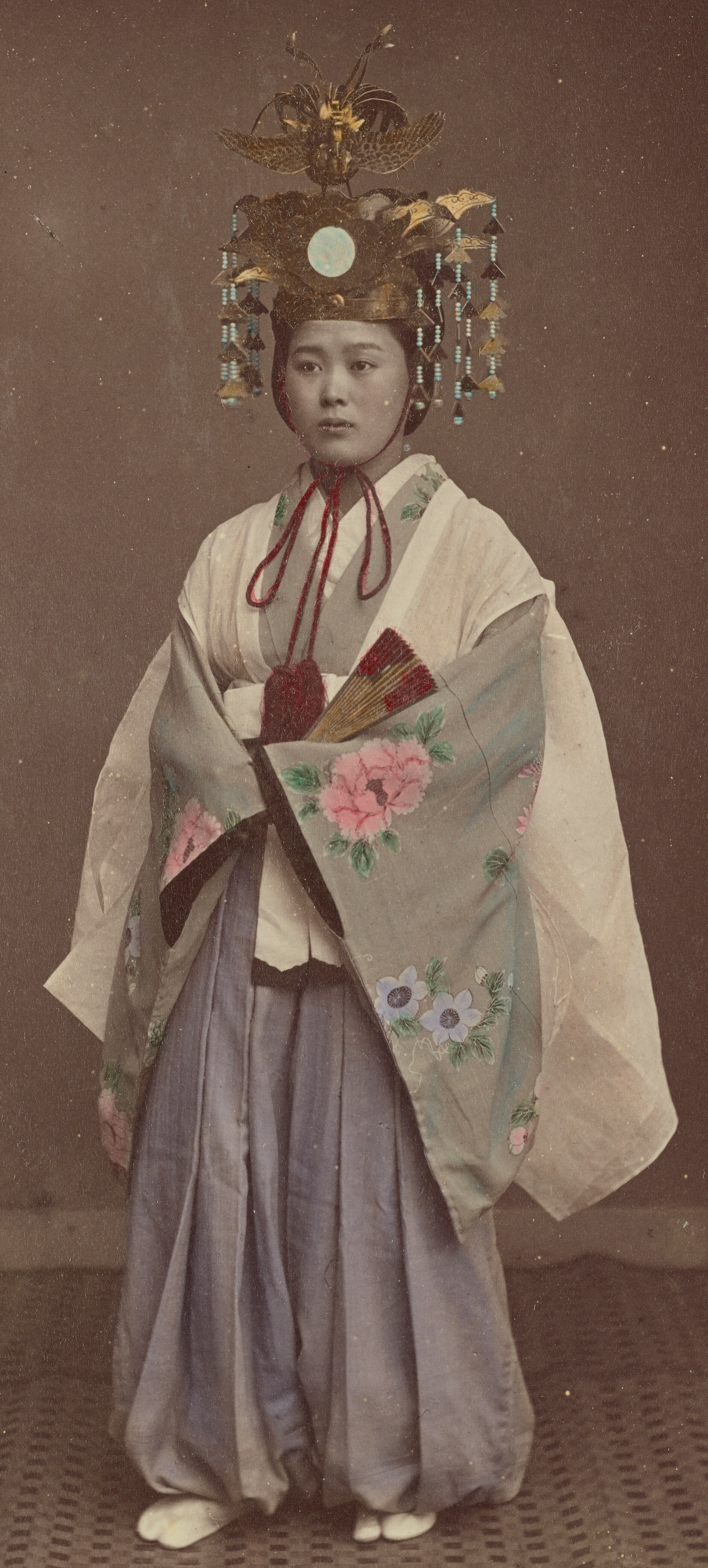
A woman wearing an elaborate headdress in Japan during the late 19th century.

During the 1880s, shappos (hats) became popularised in Japan. In July 1871, haircutting was made voluntary in an effort to convince Japanese men to move over to the Western hair styles such as zangiri atama, cropped hair, over the Japanese sakayaki (shaved pate). Following this, men started cutting off their topknot as the Emperor did in 1872. Both men and women started with Western-style hair trends, and men started growing mustaches and beards. As they changed their hairstyles, hats became common too. Also around 1872, local governments reinforced their efforts and announced that direct exposure to the head was harmful, so they started advocating for hats to protect oneself. For grand ceremonies, there were hats that were ship-shaped, lesser ceremonies called for silk hats, and if one was wearing a frock coat to a ceremony (usually lower civil workers), they only wore a top hat. Like Western-style clothing at the time, hats also became a symbol of elitism.

=== Etiquette books ===
Many new to Western clothing and styles of etiquette found it difficult to know what to wear, with codes or notices of dress often given out on what would be acceptable to an event. Many relied on etiquette books made during the Edo period and early Meiji period. Others relied on their personal experience from traveling abroad.

Seiyoishokuji, The Clothing, Food, and Dwellings of the West, was a popular book series published between 1866 and 1870, by Fukuzawa Yukichi (1835–1901). Fukuzawa was a member of the first shogunal delegation that went to both the United States and Europe. It detailed images of Western-style clothing, furniture, and objects. It also described how to wear clothing, but only for men. The first book of this series sold 150,000 copies in the first year.

=== Women's fashion ===
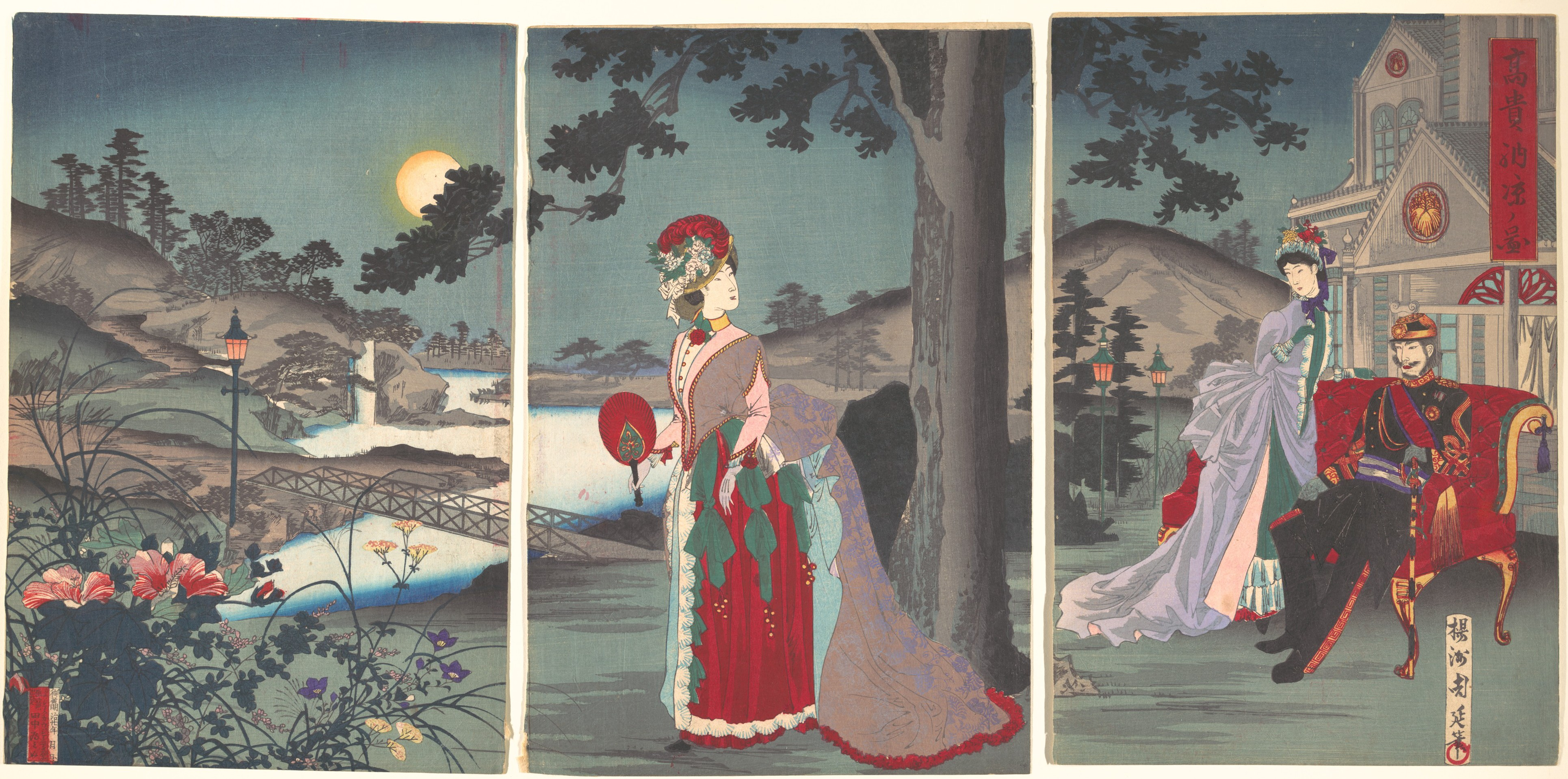
Nobility in the Evening Cool (Koki nōryō no zu), Yōshū (Hashimoto) Chikanobu, 1887

A small minority of women adopted Western fashions early on; they were mostly students, geisha, or foreigners' mistresses. Most other women considered Western dress as something to accessorise with, not completely wear. In the 1870s, women rarely participated in events including balls and social gatherings. It was not until late 1886 that a Westernised clothing system was designed for women. In September 1886, the reform for the wives of chokuninkan was designed, and in November 1886, for the soninkan. However, despite the clothing reforms being introduced, Western-style clothing was uncomfortable for most, so it took time for women to start wearing it.

For most women, the Western style came by occupation or status instead of general fashion. Female factory workers were required to start wearing Western-style uniforms with hakama (trousers) in 1873. Female students and teachers also wore hakama with Western-style shoes occasionally. For those who did wear Western styles outside of a uniform, it was difficult to obtain such clothing. Many women simply left their sizes in Paris to order a new wardrobe each year, while others might purchase their clothing in their travels to America or Europe, as early adopters were typically rich. Later on, Western-style clothing was produced in Japan.

Despite Western fashion adoption, not everything was as popular as in the West. For example, Western women were wearing crinolines, yet Japanese women rarely did. Some prostitutes in Nagasaki wore them for exotic impact, but not many others. Geisha, game for new experiments in fashion, were some of the first women to adopt Western-style clothing as more than just an accessory, though by the 1930s in the following Taishō period, no geisha wore Western clothing as part of their work.

After the Empress moved to wear Western clothing in 1886, imperial married princesses, wives of officials, and ladies-in-waiting had to wear Western clothing. For wives of officials, Western-style clothing was required only if they were in public for official business – as long as their husband was in office. There was an instance in 1893 where the wife of a Belgian minister called on Countess Ito during her reception. During this event, the Japanese women all wore kimono, much to the Belgian woman's surprise.

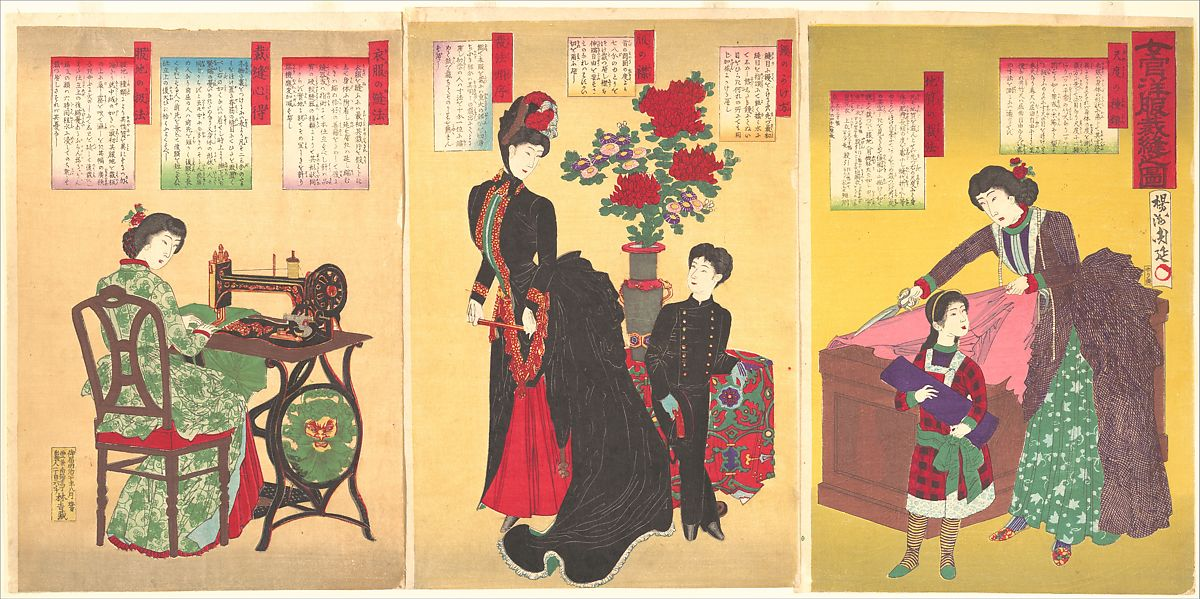
Court Ladies Sewing Western Clothing (Jokan yōfuku saihō no zu), Yōshū (Hashimoto) Chikanobu, 1887

During the Meiji period, blackened teeth and shaved eyebrows began to fall out of fashion. In 1873, the Empress stopped blackening her teeth and shaving her eyebrows, which implied a governmental demand that all women stop as well. Additionally, despite women's move to Victorian hairstyles, women were asked not to cut their hair short. Those who did were considered oddities. As for specific hairstyles, women wore their hair in the sokuhatsu style, a pompadour that resembled chignons of the Gibson Girl style. In this style, the farther forward one's hair was, the more daring one's hairstyle was. This hairstyle was considered healthier than other Western hairstyles as it did not require pins or pomade, like similar coiffures. Japanese women in the early Meiji period were far more likely to adopt the sokuhatsu hairstyle over Western dress. Around the same time, many women were starting to wear geta with trousers or kimono with Western shoes or boots. This was a period of hybridisation between Japanese and Western fashion for women and men alike.

Between 1876 and 1880, the bustle fell out of fashion. Now, as Japan transitioned into its Rokumeikan era, women adopting Western fashion at a greater pace, wearing corsets and leather shoes. During the Rokumeikan era, women occasionally fainted from tight-lacing. During the early parties of the Rokumeikan, many royal ladies wore scarlet hakama and hakki (kimono-shaped over robes) they used for courtly functions. By the third year of the Rokumeikan, royal parties were a roughly even split between Western and Japanese clothing styles.

In 1884, court-ordered clothing regulations came into place. For parties and banquets, women were to wear formal court dresses with low necks. For semiformal parties and banquets, they were to wear semiformal court dresses with a demi-low neck. For lunches at the palace, women wore simple court dresses with a high neck and skirt train. The most formal dresses were European models with a cloak and long train. Additionally, despite the Western influence of clothing, some Japanese-made Western-style women's clothing did have a more Japanese aspect, in using traditional kimono textiles in place of imported fabric.

Geisha wore Western clothing commonly. They were often depicted as wearing black tafetta gowns with gold earrings and bracelets, with their hair parted into "eaves", wearing leather shoes on the tatami mats of teahouses.

By the end of the 1890s, the Japanese ideal female figure was the popular Western "s" shape; however, towards the end of the Meiji period in 1912, both women's hairstyles and the ideal silhouette had changed drastically from the 1890s ideal. The natural shape of a woman's body grew to be more important (compared to earlier corset-shaped silhouette), and women started to cut their hair short without fear of being outcast.

== Kimono ==
=== Wearing ===
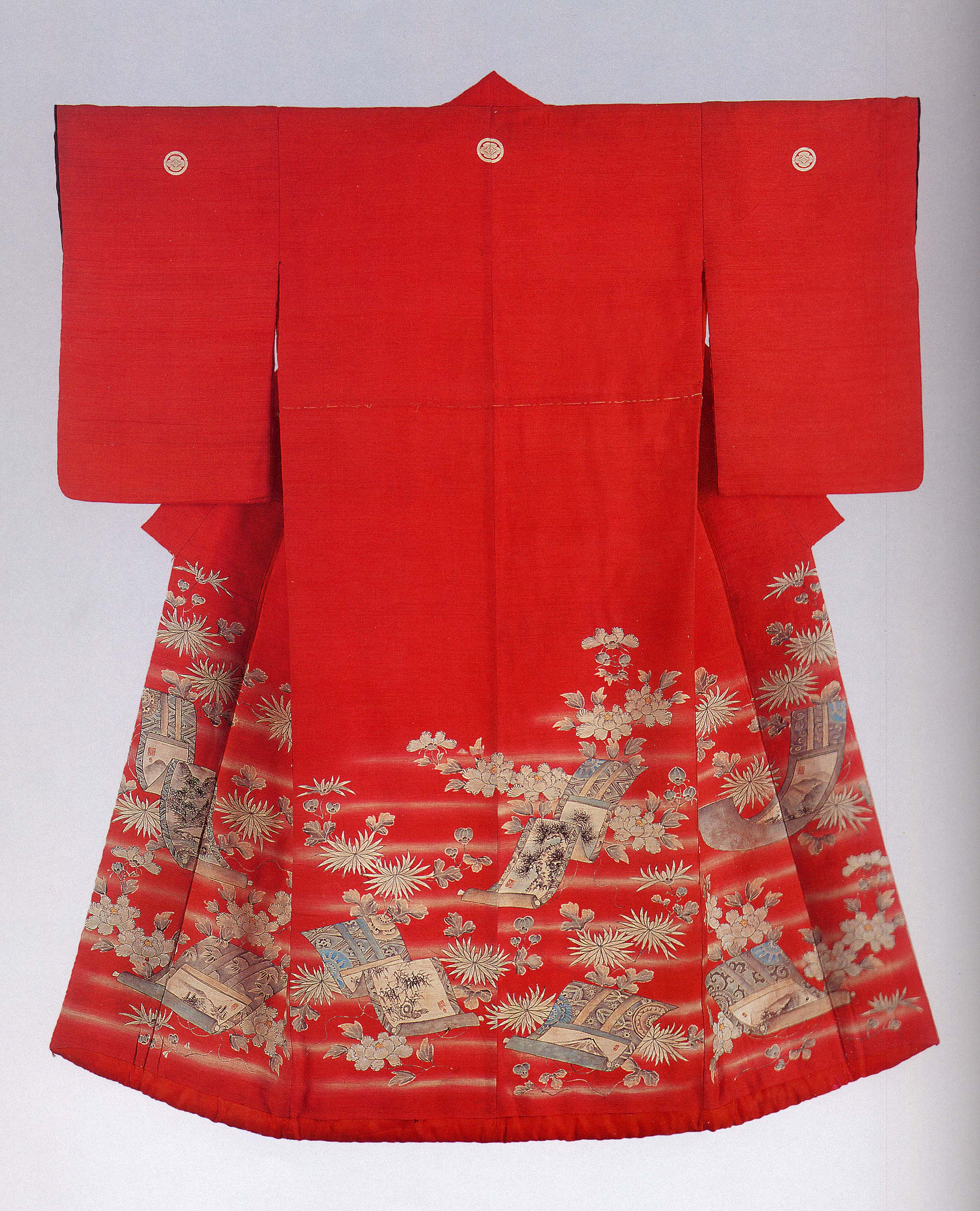
Outer kimono for a high-class young woman (uchikake) with hanging scroll motifs, 1880–1890

Throughout the Meiji period, the way in which women wore kimono changed drastically; contrastingly, the way men wore kimono changed very little, as men continued wearing Western clothing despite 1890s reforms and the resurgence of nativism.

By the mid-Meiji period, every woman of every class and age had begun tying her obi in the back; though a front-tied obi had previously signified a girl's passage to adulthood, the only women in society who now wore their obi tied at the front were prostitutes. The later Meiji period also saw a wider variety of styles of obi and obi musubi (obi knots). However, the most popular was (and still is) the taiko musubi style, a boxy, simple knot requiring a shorter obi than most styles at the time. Unlike modern-day obi, Meiji-period women's obi were both longer and wider; obi were also worn lower on the body, creating a more "voluptuous" silhouette.

While not often seen today, trailing kimono had been previously common as dress for women. Women of high status either held their kimono hem up with one hand when outside the house (a style also emulated by geisha, and seen as relatively chic), tied it up with a small, decorative obi known as a shigoki obi (a style both more decorative and more proper), or, for those lower class, simply tied it up with cord or a tie, left bloused over the hip, the method of tying itself concealed. Over time, throughout the Meiji period, all women came to tie up the excess length of women's kimono into a hip fold (the ohashori) at all times, instead of merely outside the home. Trailing kimono, though relegated to formal ceremony in the modern day, can still be seen vestigially in the over-long length of modern women's kimono.

=== Construction and styles of kimono ===
Early Meiji-period kimono were also constructed differently to modern-day kimono. The sleeves of kimono during the Meiji period were longer than today's counterparts, with a number of additional aspects not seen in the present day, such as padded hems, contrasting linings and coloured collars on everyday kimono, as well as layered, matching sets (known as o-tsui) of two or three garments. The outermost garment of these layered sets, known as the uwagi, would be accompanied by 1–3 shitagi (underlayers) with a similar design, though these layers sported decoration techniques a step down from the outer layer, such as dyework in the place of embroidery. Formal kimono always came in coordinated o-tsui sets, and even informal kimono would have been worn layered, though did not typically match in design as o-tsui sets did.

The padded linings seen on Meiji-period kimono were shown prominently at both the hem and sleeve openings; these were often in contrasting colours that referenced aristocratic 11th century colour aesthetics. Padding varied based on a person's age and the level of formality: a young girl might display as much as 2 inches (5.1 cm) of lining, whereas an older woman would conceal hers; cotton, and other less formal kimono, would be less padded than a formal silk kimono. Additionally, a woman might even try to hide her age by revealing more of her lining, but an incongruous display of padded sleeve and hem openings risked being seen as ridiculous if the difference between the wearer's age and their dress was too great.

By the mid-Meiji period, distinct styles of kimono indicating the wearer's class had been almost eradicated. Geisha started to model new kimono fashions, and "proper" wives, historically socially above geisha in class, began to feel comfortable copying these styles without cause for concern. With class distinctions and mandates of dress eradicated as part of the Meiji Restoration, a student could wear the same kimono as a high official. In the early Meiji period, these former distinctions had been largely replaced by the societal concepts of ryakugi and reisō, a system of organising types of kimono based on occasion of wear. Ryakugi was a category of everyday wear, consisting of study, durable woven silk, hemp, cotton, linen and wool kimono, often dyed and decorated in plain, muted colours and designs. In contrast, reisō was a category of formal clothing, where one's best, finest silk kimono, adorned with the correct number of crests (mon), were worn, typically layered. These were generally saved for New Year's and wedding ceremonies.

By the end of the Meiji period, a new category of kimono bridging the gap between everyday clothing and ceremonial wear had come into existence, known as hōmongi (lit. 'visiting wear'). Kimono categorised as hōmongi, which were patterned silk kimono, could be worn to any situation in which a woman needed to make a public, social appearance for which informal wear would be inappropriate. Additionally, following calls in the 1890s towards a return to nativism, some sectors of society had switched from wearing Western-style uniform back to kimono; the uniforms of grade-school girls, for instance, reverted to that of kimono once again.

=== Decoration, colours and motifs ===
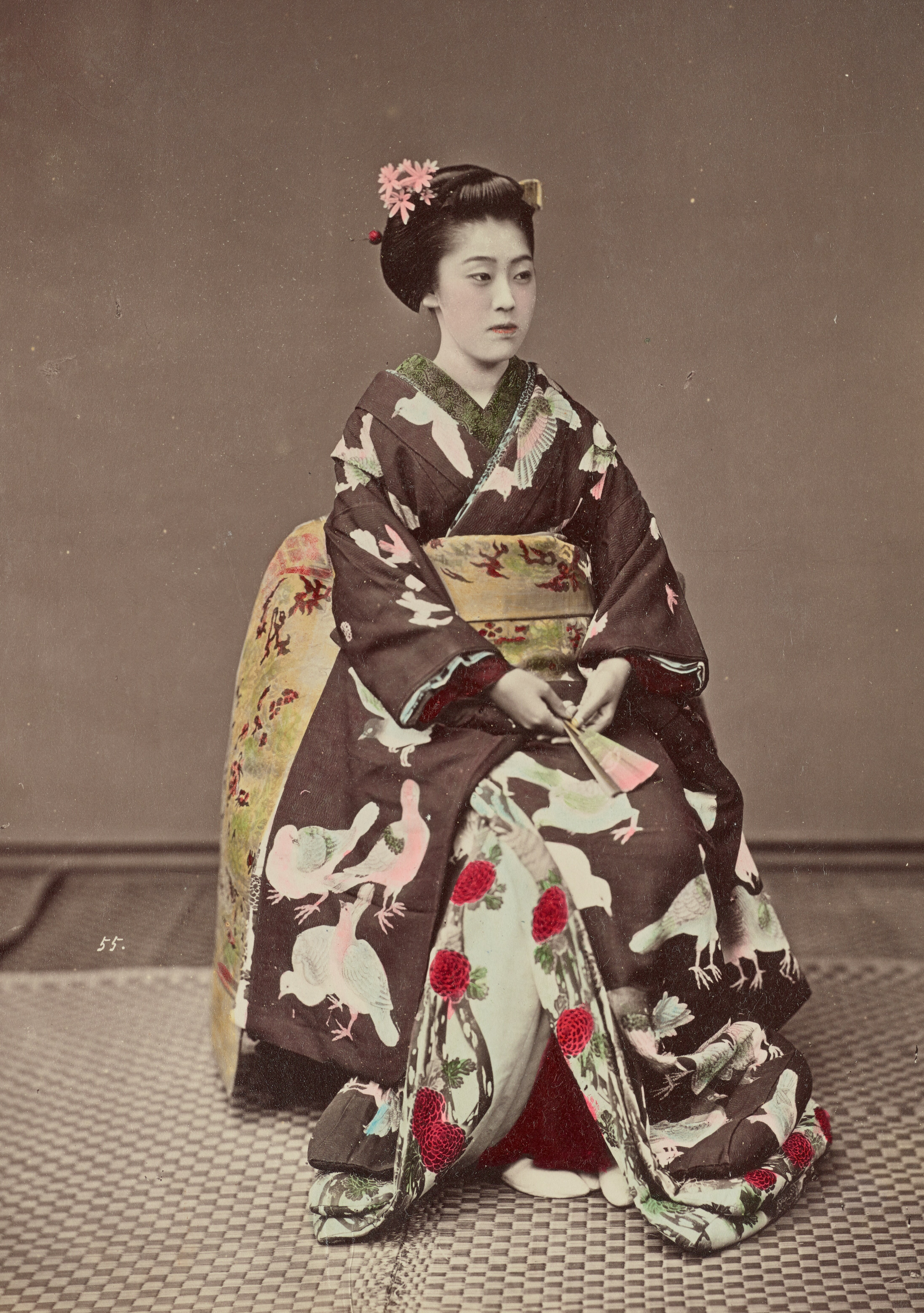
Hand-colored silver albumen photograph depicting a Meiji-period woman wearing a kimono with an underkimono patterned with chrysanthemums

During the early Meiji period, popular kimono colours changed little; the colours of choice were darker, typically blues, grays, browns, and, for women, purple. Garments were mostly monochrome, with little woven or additional decoration; extant decoration typically took the form of simple stripes, plaids, lattice designs, or ikat weaves.

Early Meiji yūzen saw two main styles of dyework: edo doki and gosho doki. Edo doki was a style of small floral and grass patterns accentuated with gold embroidery on a plain, monochrome background. Gosho doki was a contrastingly more grandiose style, featuring palace-style, florid designs, depicting birds, butterflies, paulownia trees and waterfalls; this style reflected the tastes of noblewomen in the early Meiji period, whose clothing commonly referenced old court patterns and Japanese texts such as The Tale of Genji. The han'eri – a detachable collar cover sewn to the collar of the juban – began the Meiji period as colourful, embroidered and relatively prominent when worn; by the end of the Meiji period, the han'eri was often plain-white or unobtrusive, was typically unembroidered, and was worn relatively concealed under the outer layer of kimono.

During the late 1880s, kimono fashions in terms of decoration, colour and motifs began to change for political reasons. The Meiji constitution had been in effect for 20 years, a point at which the progress of the Meiji period was re-assessed, including progress in fashion. By the 1890s, judgement throughout society was passed that the country's Westernisation had gone too far, leading to calls for a return to nativism, including within the realm of fashion. Kimono motifs such as chrysanthemums (the imperial flower) with the rising sun flag became more common, demonstrating patriotism. Even haori linings, collars, and children's kimono began sporting more patriotic motifs, such as cherry blossoms, the traditional flower of the samurai classes.

Later, in the 1890s, brighter pastel colours grew in popularity for kimono; though these colours were brighter than those of the early Meiji period, many were grey-toned shades of normal colours, typically named with the prefix nezumi, meaning "mouse grey": 'purplish-gray', 'reddish-gray' and 'orangish-gray' were all common, and popular, colours, seen as sophisticated in contrast to the heavy tones of the early Meiji period. Kimono patterns also grew bolder in the 1890s. Crepe silks with stenciled, repeating patterns became popular, known as komon; revived in popularity in the 1880s by geisha, the popularity of komon as a style of more formal social wear spread throughout society in a couple of years.

However, by the late 1890s, komon began to fade in popularity, a combination of social circumstance – as women now had more opportunity to be seen at, and attend, fashionable social gatherings – and changing styles, as the small, repeating patterns of komon were hard to discern under the gas lamp lighting of Meiji-period streets, particularly if the pattern was shown only along the hem of the wearer's outfit. In response to these changing circumstances, women began to favour bolder, brighter colours and designs, and the placement of pattern on women's kimono shifted from along the hem only to further up the body, where it would still be seen, even if the wearer was sat on a chair in a Western-style establishment. In 1901, Art Nouveau designs became popular for both obi and juban, complimenting the bold combination of stacked designs – peonies on top of stripes, snow-laden bamboo over a repeat background – now seen on kimono.

In 1904, kimono fashion changed further with the inception of the Russo-Japanese War. A dark shade of blue known as 'victory blue' became popular, and large-scale kimono designs similar to those of the 17th century, Genroku period kosode also experienced popularity. Traditional designs, such as oversized checkerboard patterns with nature motifs depicted in minute, dappled tie-dye, also experienced popularity.

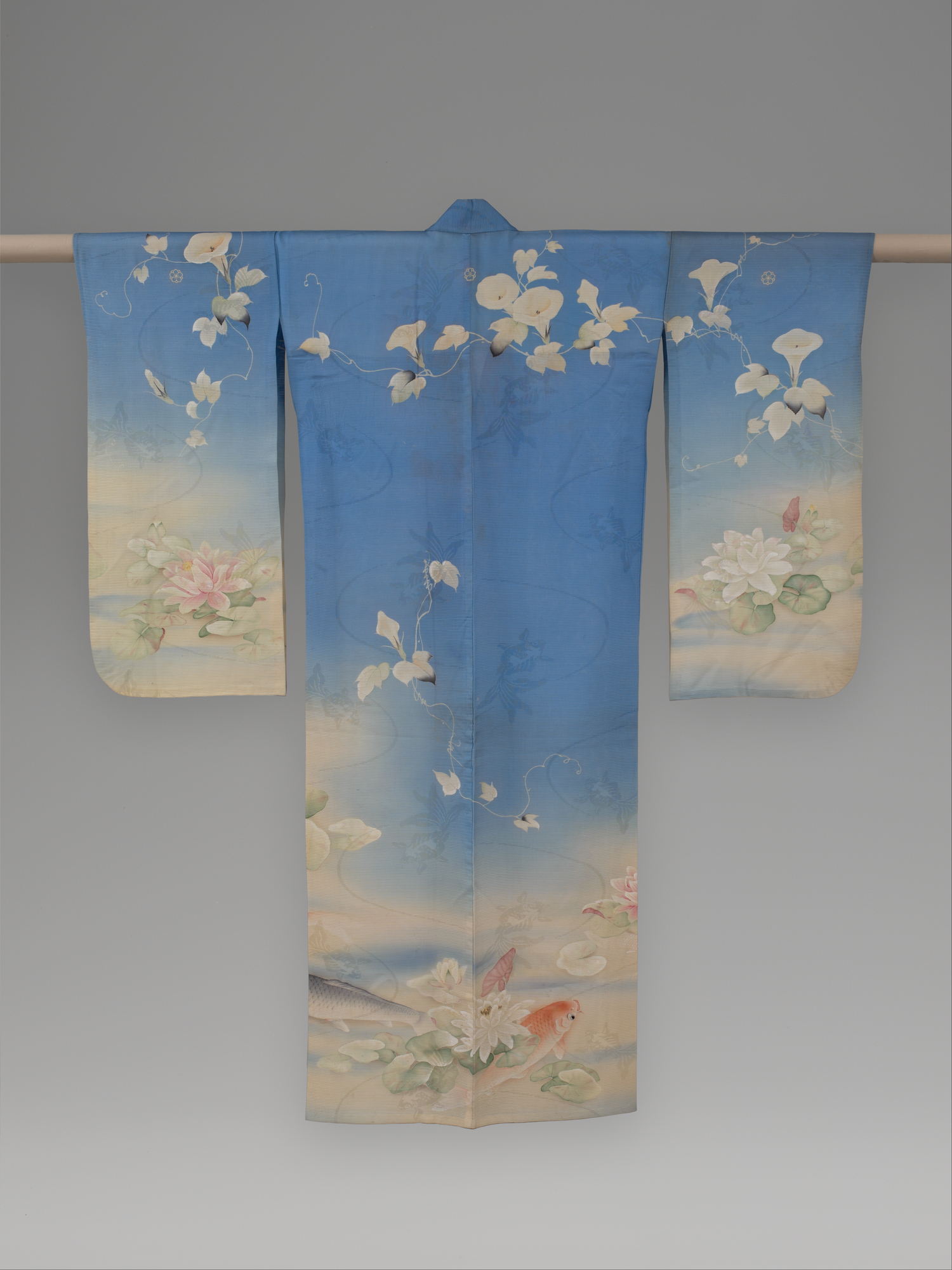
Unlined summer kimono (usumono) with carp, water lilies, and morning glories, c. 1876

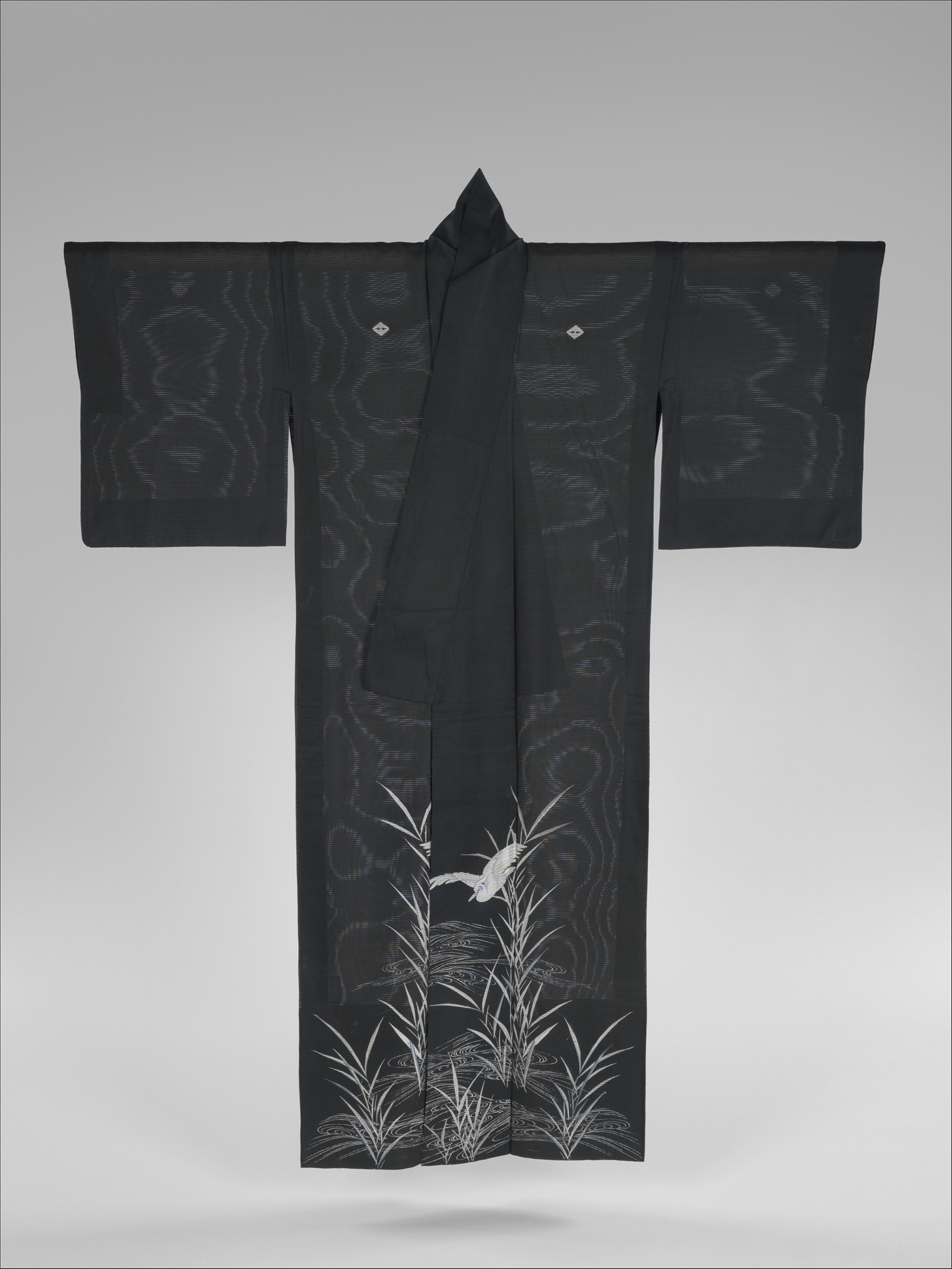
Unlined summer kimono (usumono) with heron and reeds, late 19th century

== Dress reform ==
In February 1868, the System Research Department (seido torishirabegakari) was established, and in June of that year, sent out letters to various high-ranking members of society, such as the aristocracy, daimyō and feudal retainers in Kyoto for opinions on national dress reform. The following year, the department designed a clothing reform system with the assistance of Saga Sanenaru (1820–1909), a government official in the Office of Administration. The new system involved a "headdress-clothing system" in which rank and status were portrayed through the use of colours and specific patterns; however, this did not come to pass, as the Japanese government wanted a simpler system.

Later, in June 1870, Ninagawa Noritane designed a new system of clothing reform, simpler than Saga's. Ultimately, former samurai were forced to pick between Western-style clothing or the headdress-clothing system, and ultimately chose to adopt the Western-style clothing, despite its uncomfortable aspects.

Later, on 4 August 1871, sanpatsu (loose hair), datto (no sword), ryakufuku (simplified dress), and the wearing of uniforms became voluntary. Shortly after, on 9 August, Western dress was also allowed for bureaucrats.

== Emperor and Empress ==
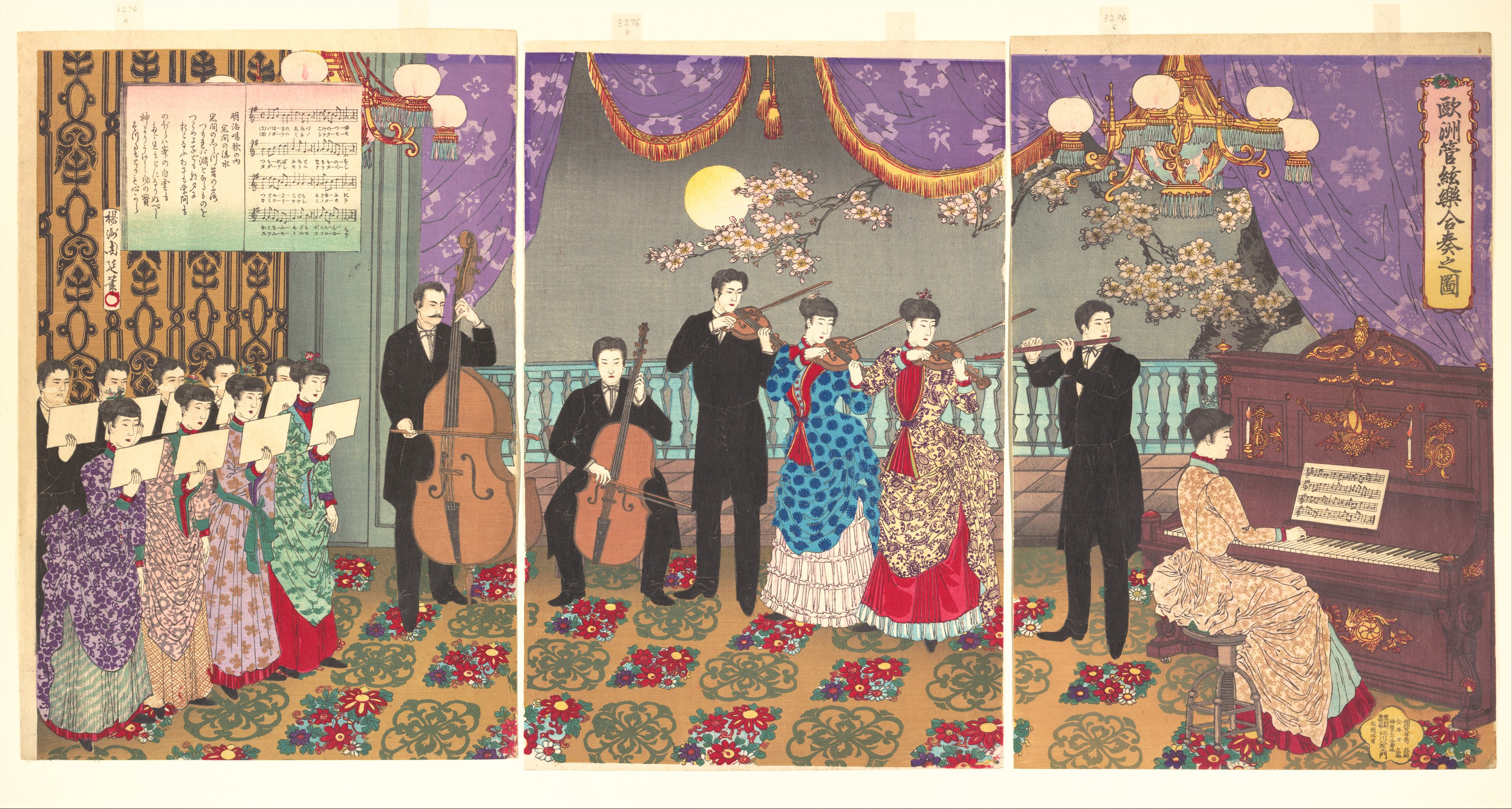
Concert of European Music (Ōshū kangengaku gassō no zu)), Yōshū (Hashimoto) Chikanobu, 1889

In 1872, the Emperor Meiji decided to cut off his topknot and move to Western-style clothing, establishing a modern era of Japan through way of example. However, despite his early adoption of Western styles, the Empress Shōken did not adopt Western clothing until much later, in 1886, creating a 14-year period wherein the Emperor appeared "modern", while the Empress still wore kimono. The Empress appeared in Western clothing for the first time in 1886; thereafter, both the Empress and her entourage wore Western clothing in public, favouring high-necked gowns in particular.

However, unlike the Emperor, most Japanese women did not follow the Empress by way of example, with mostly women within the Imperial court, such as her ladies-in-waiting, the wives of officials, and married princesses wearing Western clothing. Younger princesses were exempt, and often still wore kimono to events; in contrast, young princes of the Imperial household did wear Western-style clothing, "perhaps in anticipation of their weighty responsibilities as imperial males." The Imperial household would continue to wear Western clothing, even in the 1890s, when a wave of nativism swept the nation and wafuku became popular once again. The only time the Empress would appear in public in kimono would be when giving speeches to arriving diplomats and their wives, though did not revert to older court traditions of shaving one's eyebrows and blackening one's teeth on these occasions; the Emperor would continue to wear Western clothing on such occasions.

== Specific uniforms ==
=== Government official uniforms ===
When Western clothing was enforced as uniform for governmental officials in 1871, there was considerable difficulty faced in finding a tailor who could construct the uniform itself, as in the early Meiji period, Western-style tailors were relatively rare in Japan. Kimono needed far less shaping than Western clothing, and were sewn considerably differently. However, foreign suit-makers with Japanese apprentices in the port of Yokohama did exist. For those in military positions, in non-ceremonial conditions, such as simply going to work, only a simplified military uniform and hat was required. However, for ceremonial occasions, grand military outfits were required, complete with medals attached. For lesser officials, common work attire was a frock coat, with military uniform only required for ceremonies. Earlier in 1870, it had been decided that naval cadets would wear British-style uniforms, while army cadets would wear uniforms in the French style.

Western-style ceremonial clothing and medals were reserved for higher-ranked governmental officials. Uniforms for government officials denoted their different statuses and grades, with decorative features seen on their medals. Gold embellishments were reserved for the chokuninkan, officials appointed by the Emperor, and the soninkan, officials appointed by the Prime Minister; silver embellishments were worn by the hanninkan, junior officials. The shokuninkan specifically wore a paulownia grass pattern embroidered on their upper garment where lower ranks did not.

For those of social class but no official position – mostly noble families – there were two types of uniform. One was for those in the fourth rank or higher (on level with the chokuninkan), known as the chokunin bunkan tai-reifuku; this uniform lacked the paulownia embellishment of the chokuninkan ranks. The other uniform was worn by those in the fifth rank or below (on level with the soninkan), known as the sonin bunkan tai-reifuku, which was worn without embellishments.

On April 10, 1875, the Japanese government declared a medal system to honor merit. The Order of the Rising Sun (kyokujitsu-sho) consisted of merit levels one through eight and had rays beaming from a sun.

=== School uniforms ===
While boys uniforms were modelled on military uniforms, original girl's uniforms during the Meiji period were modelled after Japanese elements. The original girl's uniform included hakama worn over their kimono. However, these girls' uniforms disappeared towards the end of the Meiji period during its return to nativism. They did not re-emerge until the 1920s.

== Resistance to clothing reform ==
In 1875, shortly after clothing reform was decided by the Emperor Meiji, considerable protest arose against the implementation of Western clothing in various positions in Japanese society. For instance, Shimazu Hisamitsu (1817–1887), samurai and virtual ruler of the Satsuma Domain, arrived at court with 250 vassals, all sporting topknots and swords; Hisamitsu argued that traditional dress was important to separate the lowest and highest classes in Japan, but also to separate Japan from other countries, and that if the traditional clothing system was abolished, idea of social status would need to be continued in any future clothing system. The government responded in October 1875 by stating that the Emperor's new Western-style attire was adopted for "the beauty and good of European countries", and that other changes, such as to hair styles and the wearing of swords, were just natural changing customs.

There was more resistance than Hisamitsu's. In general, those who disliked the change believed the reforms emphasised class too much. Those generally opposed to the government commented that the Western-style followers of the ruling classes were too vain and cared for appearances far too much.

In 1879, Honda Kinkichiro began satirising the government through publishing cartoons; in one issue of the Marumaru Chibun, Kinkichiro portrayed the government as monkeys for their imitation of Westerners. There were many comments by critics on how these Western fashion followers dressed using ill-fitting clothing in an awkward mimicry of Westerners.

In 1889, journalist Ishikawa Yasuhiro (1872–1925) coined the term haikara (wasei eigo for English "high collar") to derogatorily reference men who cared for Western fashion. By 1902, some women were also referred to as haikara with a hairstyle called the haikara hisashigami ("high collar pompadour"). Later, schoolgirls were lumped in as well, and known as haikara jogakusei for their tied up hair with ribbons in a high-collar style. These schoolgirls also commonly wore maroon (ebichai) hakama and rode bikes to school. They popularised the padded, unisex student overcoat known as the shosei haori.

The arrival of the bankara, a masculine ideal constructed in response to the high-collar gentleman, and the soshi, a fashion reformist group, also heralded the further introduction of resistance to dress reform. Both the bankara ideal and the soshi group were extremely anti-fashion. The bankara rejected the notion of the high-collar gentleman as a masculine ideal, and expressed a "return to barbarism and celebration of male primitivism." The ideal bankara was born as the masculine response to the high-collar gentlemen – arguing against the feminised Japanese male. The term bankara translates to "savage collar" by replacing the "high" in high collar with the character for savage or barbarous. The bankara was easily identified by tucked up sleeves, exposed forearms, and a dark complexion. The bankara was popular with young students for the belief in "action over speech, romantic notions of adventure and daring, and the simplicity of rustic tastes." The soshi did not care for the materialistic culture the West had introduced, and both viewed the government's actions as shameful. The soshi commonly wore torn kimono with their sleeves tucked in, long hair, geta, and often wielded clubs. With their statement of anti-fashion, they also rejected the "superficiality and frivolity" of the Meiji state. The soshi were famous for their anti-government commentary and played songs that criticised the government. In turn, the soshi became advocates for the political freedom of people.
