= Rybachy Peninsula =

Northernmost part of continental European Russia

Coordinates: 69.7°N 32.6°E

Rybachy Peninsula is the most northeastern part of Pechengsky District

Rybachy Peninsula (Russian: полуо́стров Рыба́чий, poluostrov Rybachiy; Northern Sami: Giehkirnjárga; Norwegian: Fiskerhalvøya; Finnish: Kalastajasaarento) is the northernmost part of continental European Russia. Its name is translated as "Fisher Peninsula". It is connected with the Sredny Peninsula, "Middle Peninsula" by a thin isthmus. So the peninsula is in fact nearly completely surrounded by water. Administratively, it is included into Pechengsky District of Murmansk Oblast and is within several hours of ride from Murmansk.

Main occupations of the population are reindeer herding and (since 2003) petroleum drilling.

== History ==
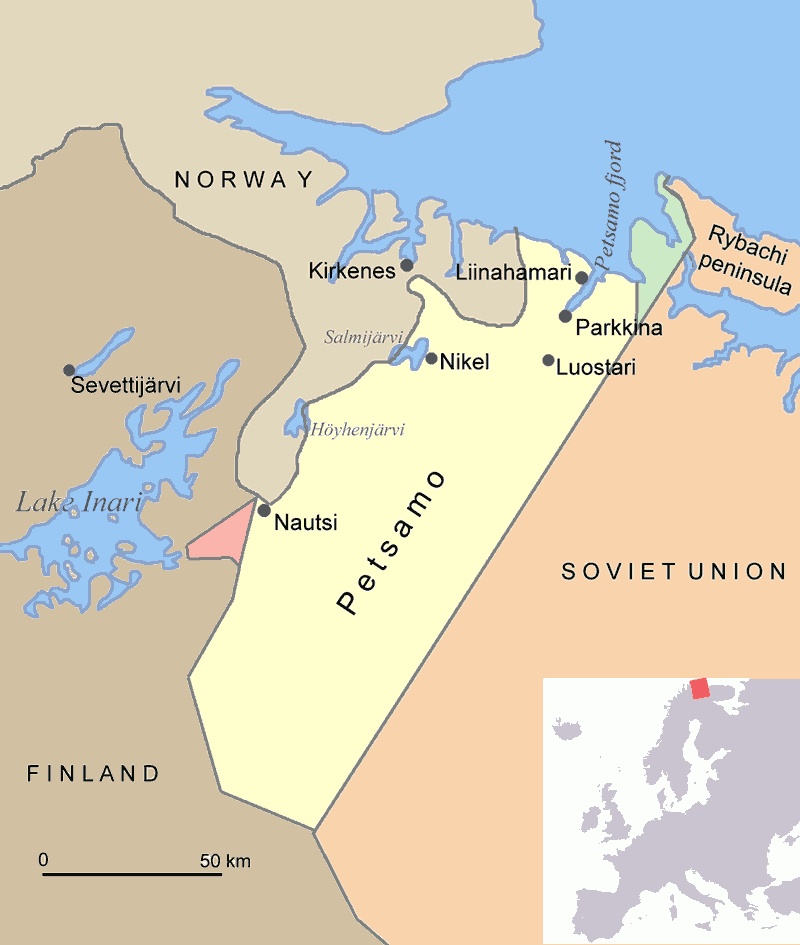
Historical map of the Petsamo region. Finnish part of the Rybachy peninsula (Kalastajasaarento) which was ceded to the Soviet Union after the Winter War.

The peninsula lies in an area where borders were marked relatively late; the Norwegian-Russian border was drawn in 1826, leaving Rybachy on the Russian side of the border. At the time, several Norwegian settlers lived on the peninsula.

After the Russian Revolution, the western parts of Sredny and Rybachy were ceded to Finland. After the Winter War of 1939–1940, Finland ceded them to the Soviet Union by the Moscow Peace Treaty. The Norwegian settlers became "trapped" in Soviet Russia after the revolution; some of their descendants were allowed Norwegian citizenship after the fall of the Iron Curtain.

During the World War II for three years it was an arena of a positional war between Germans and Soviets. The peninsula covered the access to Murmansk and Arkhangelsk, which were the main gates for the Lend-Lease. The front split the peninsula in two parts, both sides having heavily fortified positions.

Before the dissolution of the Soviet Union the territory was heavily militarized because of the immediate vicinity of Norway, a NATO member. Now the military is removed, but in 2005 the territory was still closed to foreigners.

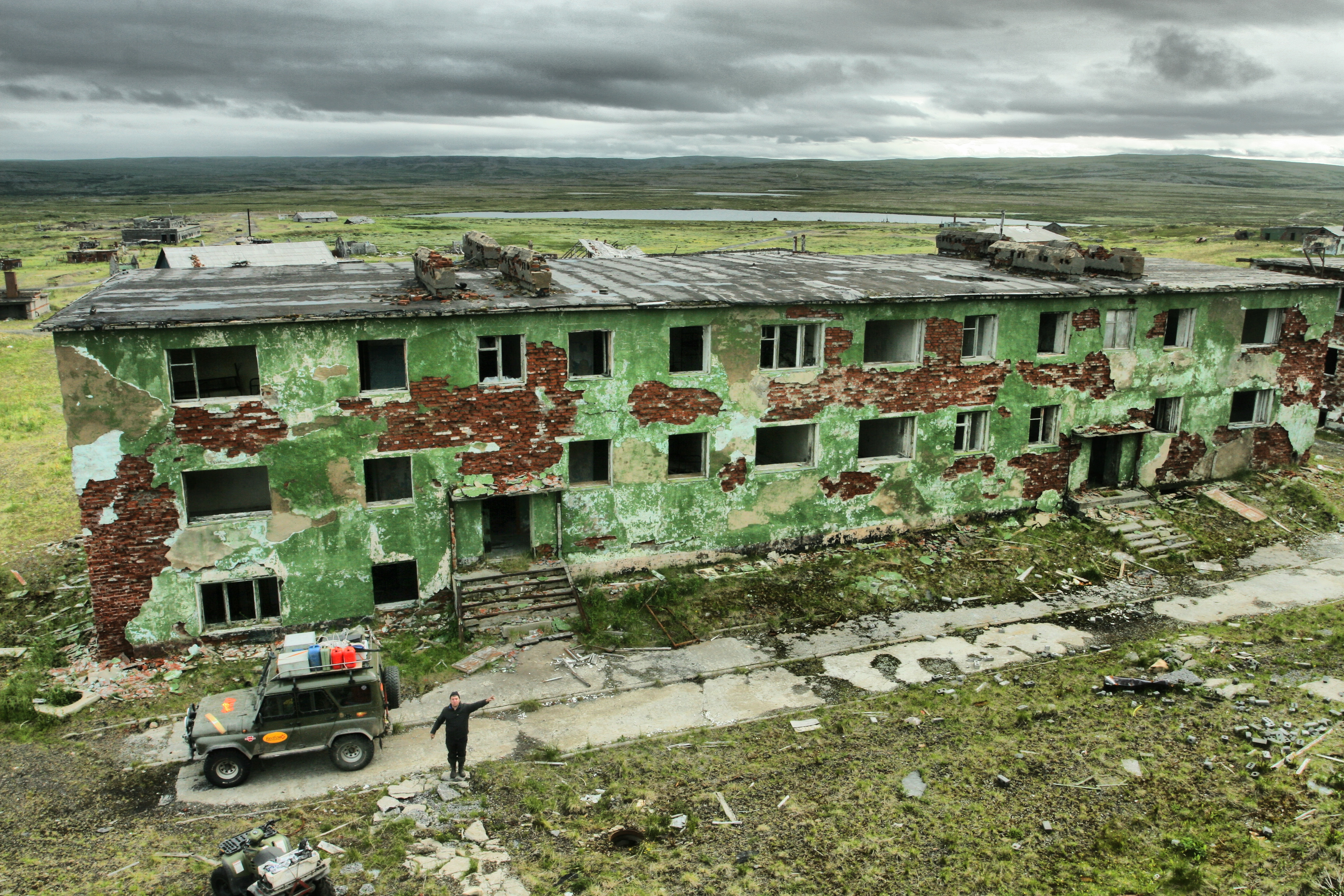
Dilapidated building in Skorbeevsky Cape (Мыс Скорбеевский), former military garrison

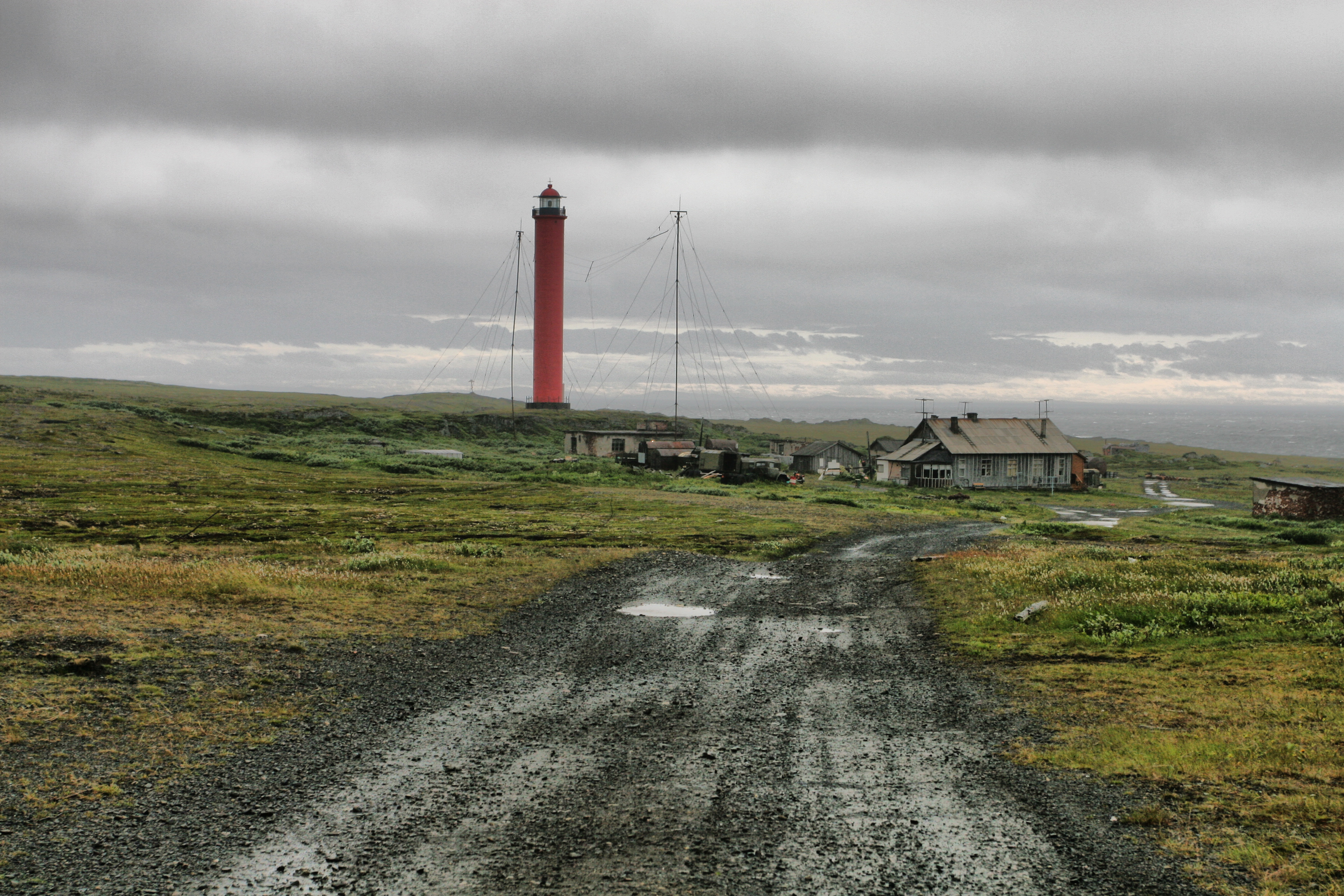
Vaida-Guba

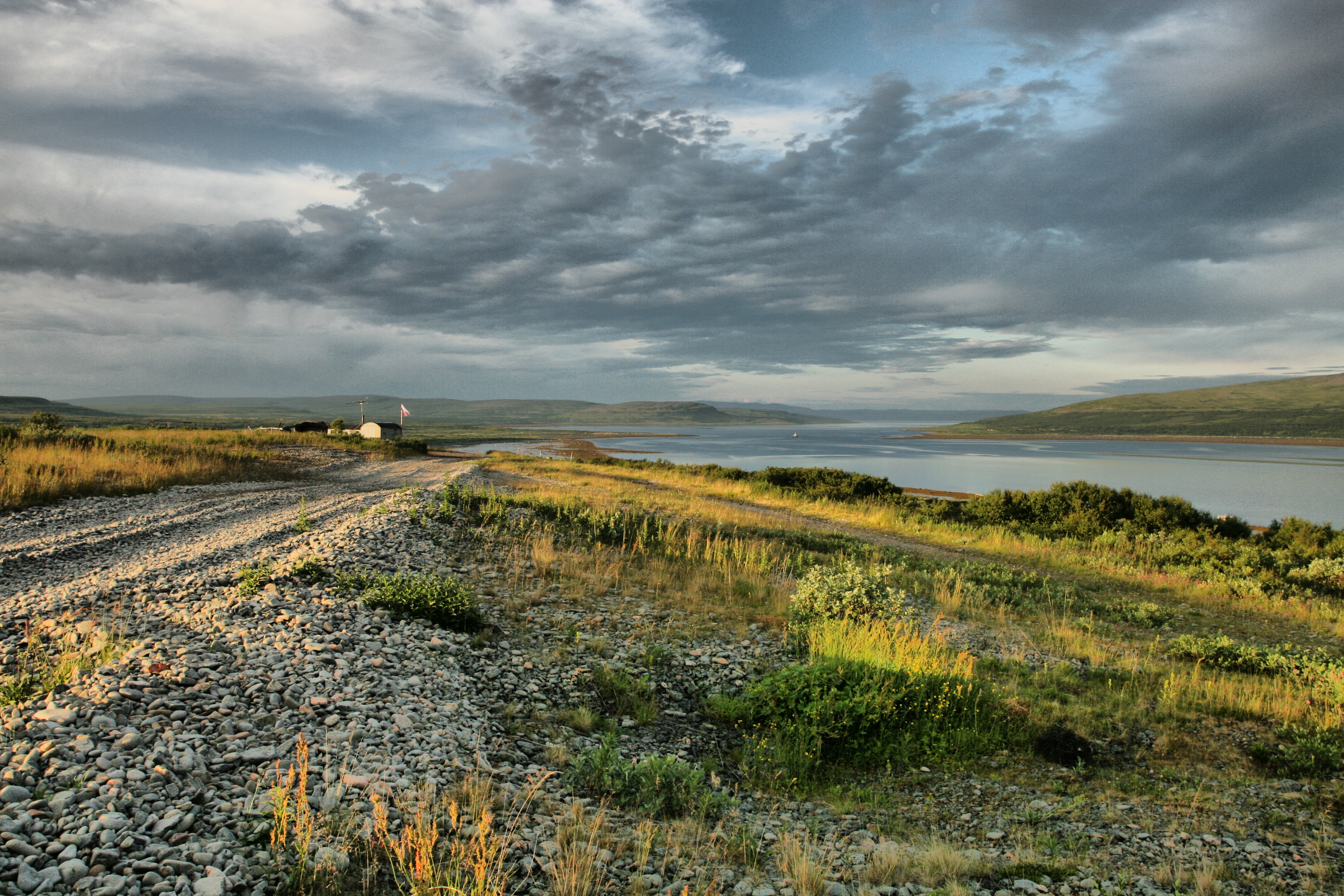
Ozyorko bay

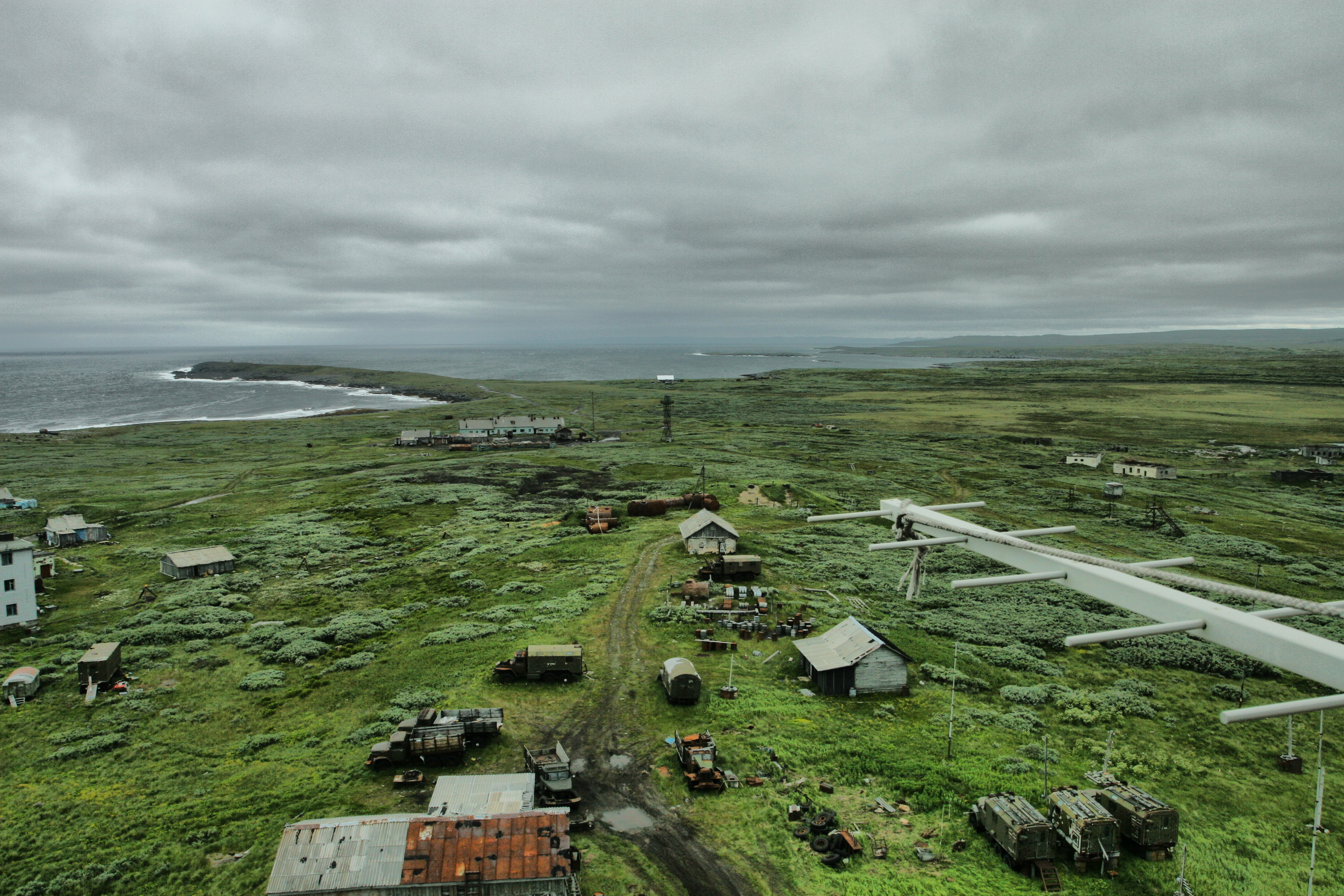
Tsypnavolok, on the east side

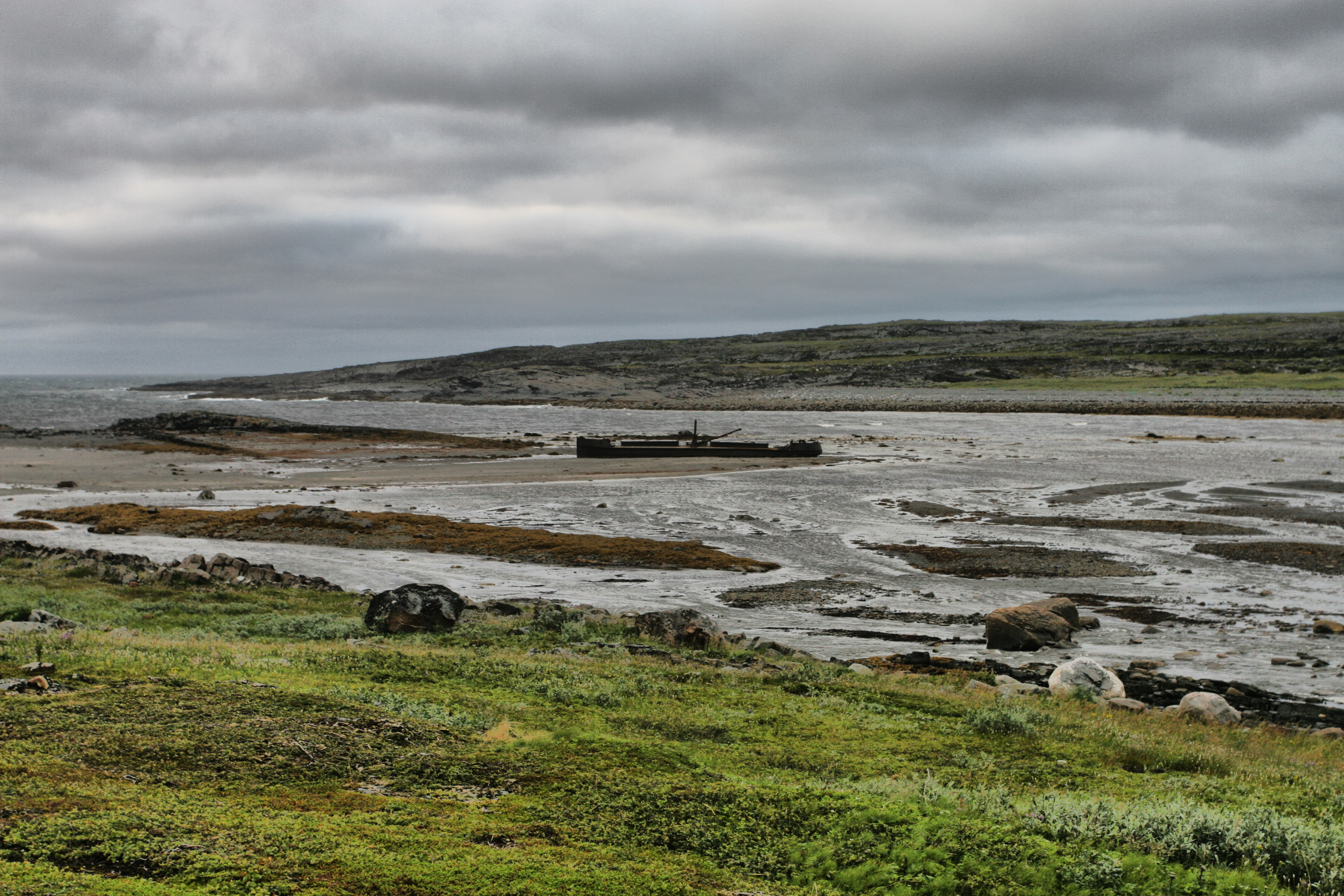
Shipwreck

== See also ==
- Zubovskaya Bay
