= Tsypnavolok =

Tsypnavolok Цыпнаволок
- Inhabited locality
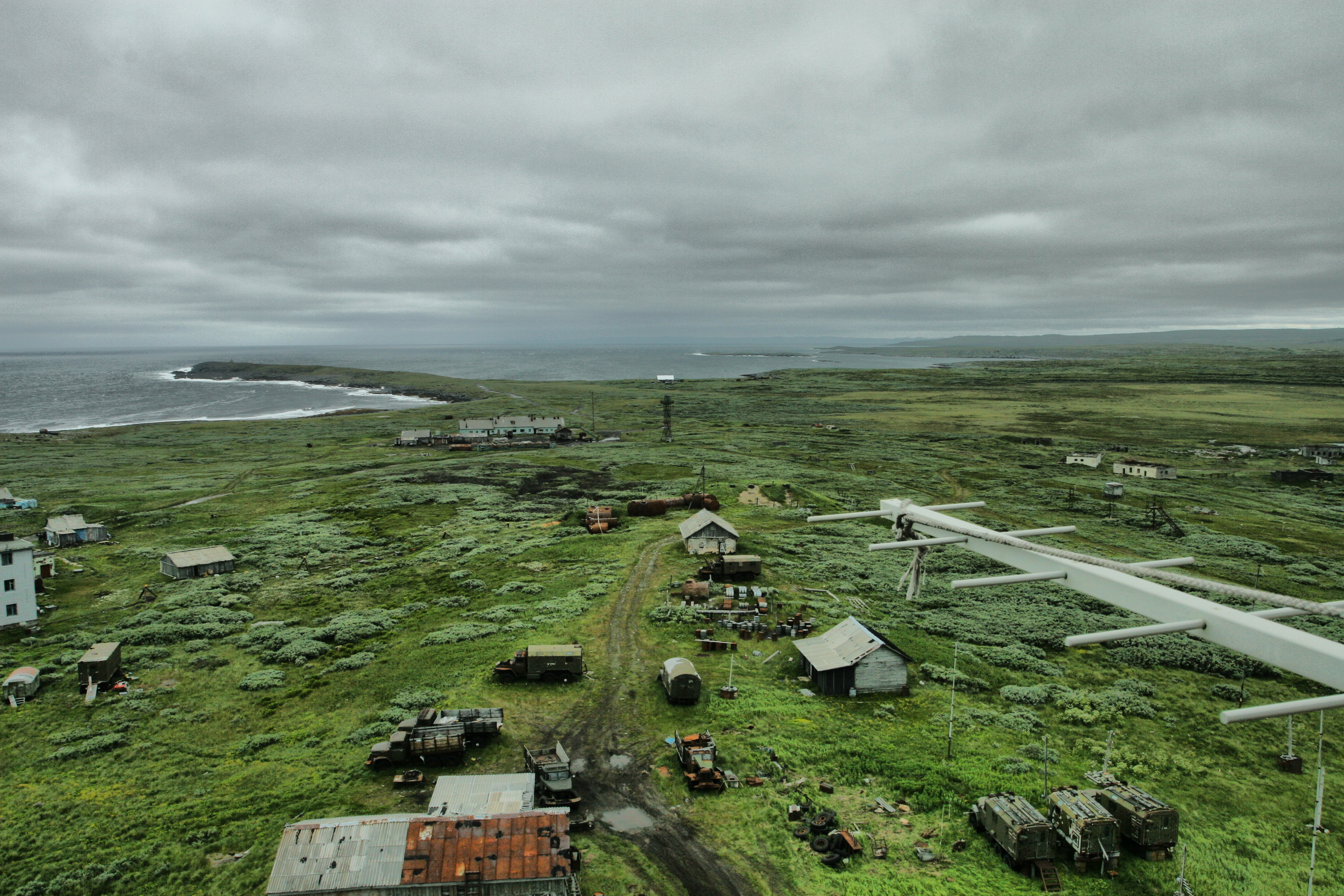
- Cape Tsypnavolok
- Interactive map of Tsypnavolok
- Location of Tsypnavolok Tsypnavolok (Murmansk Oblast)
- Coordinates: 69°43′04″N 33°05′31″E
- Country: Russia
- Federal subject: Murmansk Oblast
- Founded: 1867

Population (2010 Census)
  - Total: 35
  - Estimate (2021): 12 (−65.7%)
- Time zone: UTC+3 (MSK)
- Postal code: 184411
- Dialing code: +7 81544
- OKTMO ID: 47615162116

Tsypnavolok or Tsyp-Navolok (Russian: Цыпнаволок, Цып-Наволок) is a rural locality (an inhabited locality) in Pechengsky District of Murmansk Oblast, Russia, located on the Rybachy Peninsula by Cape Tsypnavolok, by the Barents Sea.

== History ==
During the 1860s, the Murmansk coast of the Kola Peninsula was actively being settled. In 1867, a fishing village was established near Cape Tsypnavolok by Kola Norwegians (immigrants from Norway). In 1929, 114 ethnic Norwegians were registered in the area, and therefore in 1930 an ethnic Norwegian rural council (selsoviet) was established. In 1940, the Norwegians were transferred during the ethnic cleansing campaigns near the border, and the selsoviet was abolished.

After World War II, the Norwegians were allowed to return to Murmansk Oblast, but they were to be settled in Port-Vladimir (69°24′55.1″N 33°7′6.4″E) on Shalim Island in Kolsky District. (A naval base was later established there, civilians were evacuated in 1969 (the village was legally dissolved in 2008), and the base was closed and abandoned around 1994.)

== Modern times ==
As of 2009, Tsypnavolok hosted a military unit, a weather station, and a lighthouse.

Accumulations of sulfide (chalcopyrite, galena, pyrite, sphalerite) nodules in turbidites are found in the area.

== Climate ==
Tsypnavolok has a subarctic climate (Dfc) bordering very closely on a tundra climate (Et).

Climate data for Tsypnavolok (1991–2020 normals, extremes 1973–present)
| Month | Jan | Feb | Mar | Apr | May | Jun | Jul | Aug | Sep | Oct | Nov | Dec | Year |
|---|---|---|---|---|---|---|---|---|---|---|---|---|---|
| Record high °C (°F) | 6.4 (43.5) | 6.5 (43.7) | 9.2 (48.6) | 12.2 (54.0) | 23.5 (74.3) | 28.5 (83.3) | 31.2 (88.2) | 28.2 (82.8) | 21.9 (71.4) | 14.4 (57.9) | 10.0 (50.0) | 13.9 (57.0) | 31.2 (88.2) |
| Daily mean °C (°F) | −5.4 (22.3) | −6.1 (21.0) | −3.9 (25.0) | −0.7 (30.7) | 3.3 (37.9) | 6.8 (44.2) | 10.0 (50.0) | 10.0 (50.0) | 7.4 (45.3) | 2.6 (36.7) | −1.5 (29.3) | −3.5 (25.7) | 1.6 (34.9) |
| Record low °C (°F) | −27.0 (−16.6) | −34.7 (−30.5) | −22.0 (−7.6) | −15.6 (3.9) | −7.9 (17.8) | −3.0 (26.6) | 1.0 (33.8) | 0.0 (32.0) | −4.9 (23.2) | −11.7 (10.9) | −20.7 (−5.3) | −24.0 (−11.2) | −34.7 (−30.5) |
Source: http://www.pogodaiklimat.ru/doc/normals_1991_2020_2.txt http://pogodaiklimat.ru/summary/22012.htm
