= List of rural localities in Murmansk Oblast =

Map of Russia with Murmansk Oblast highlighted

This is a list of rural localities in Murmansk Oblast, organized by the district or municipality they are within or subordinated to, respectively. Murmansk Oblast (Russian: Му́рманская о́бласть, romanized: Murmanskaya oblast, IPA: [ˈmurmənskəjə ˈobləsʲtʲ]) is a federal subject (an oblast) of Russia, located in the northwestern part of the country. Its administrative center is the city of Murmansk. As of the 2010 Census, its population was 795,409.

== Alexandrovsk ==
Rural localities in Alexandrovsk:

- Belokamenka
- Kuvshinskaya Salma
- Olenya Guba
- Retinskoye
- Sayda-Guba

== Apatity ==
Rural localities in Apatity:

- Khibiny
- Tik-Guba

== Kandalakshsky District ==
Rural localities in Kandalakshsky District:

- Alakurtti
- Beloye More
- Fedoseyevka
- Kayraly
- Knyazhaya Guba
- Kolvitsa
- Kovda, Lesozavodsky Territorial Okrug
- Kovda, Zelenoborsky
- Kovdozero
- Kuoloyarvi
- Lesozavodsky
- Luvenga
- Nivsky
- Nyamozero
- Pinozero
- Poyakonda
- Priozerny
- Prolivy
- Ruchyi
- Zarechensk
- Zhemchuzhnaya

== Kirovsk ==
Rural localities in Kirovsk:

- Koashva
- Titan

== Kolsky District ==
Rural localities in Kolsky District:

- Dalniye Zelentsy
- Golubye Ruchyi
- Kilpyavr
- Kitsa
- Loparskaya
- Magnetity
- Mezhdurechye
- Minkino
- Mishukovo
- Mokket
- Mokraya Kitsa
- Nyal
- Ostrov Bolshoy Oleny
- Peschany
- Pulozero
- Pushnoy
- Pyayve
- Shonguy
- Svetly
- Taybola
- Teriberka
- Tuloma (rural locality)
- Ura-Guba
- Vostochny Kildin
- Vykhodnoy
- Zapadny Kildin
- Zverosovkhoz

== Kovdorsky District ==
Rural localities in Kovdorsky District:

- Kuropta
- Leypi
- Rikolatva
- Slyuda
- Yona
- Yonsky

== Lovozersky District ==
Rural localities in Lovozersky District:

- Kanevka
- Krasnoshchelye
- Lovozero - administrative center
- Sosnovka

== Monchegorsk ==
Rural localities in Monchegorsk:

- 25 km Zheleznoy Dorogi Monchegorsk–Olenya
- 27 km Zheleznoy Dorogi Monchegorsk–Olenya
- Laplandsky Zapovednik

== Olenegorsk ==
Rural localities in Olenegorsk:

- Imandra
- Laplandiya
- Putevye Usadby 1331 km
- Vysoky, Murmansk Oblast
- Yagelny Bor

== Ostrovnoy ==
Rural localities in Ostrovnoy:

- Korabelnoye
- Lumbovka
- Mayak Gorodetsky
- Mys-Chyorny
- Svyatoy Nos
- Tersko-Orlovsky Mayak

== Pechengsky District ==
Rural localities in Pechengsky District:

- Borisoglebsky
- Korzunovo
- Liinakhamari
- Luostari - inhabited locality
- Luostari - railway station
- Pechenga
- Prirechny
- Putevaya Usadba 9 km zheleznoy dorogi Luostari–Nikel
- Rayakoski
- Salmiyarvi
- Sputnik
- Titovka
- Tsypnavolok
- Vayda-Guba

== Polyarnye Zori ==
Rural localities in Polyarnye Zori:

- Afrikanda
- Pirenga
- Zasheyek

== Severomorsk ==
Rural localities in Severomorsk:

- Severomorsk-3
- Shchukozero

== Tersky District ==
Rural localities in Tersky District:

- Chapoma
- Chavanga
- Indel
- Kashkarantsy
- Kuzomen
- Mayak Nikodimsky
- Olenitsa
- Pyalitsa
- Tetrino
- Varzuga
- Vostochnoye Munozero

== Vidyayevo ==
Rural localities in Vidyayevo:

- Chan-Ruchey
- Vidyayevo

== Abolished localities ==
- Chalmny-Varre
- Drozdovka
- Goryachiye Ruchyi
- Mayak Tyuvagubsky
- Nautsi
- Nivankyul
- Oktyabrsky
- Zubovka

== See also ==
- Lists of rural localities in Russia
