= Murmansk constituency =

Russian legislative constituency in Murmansk Oblast

Murmansk single-member constituency
- Constituency of the Russian State Duma

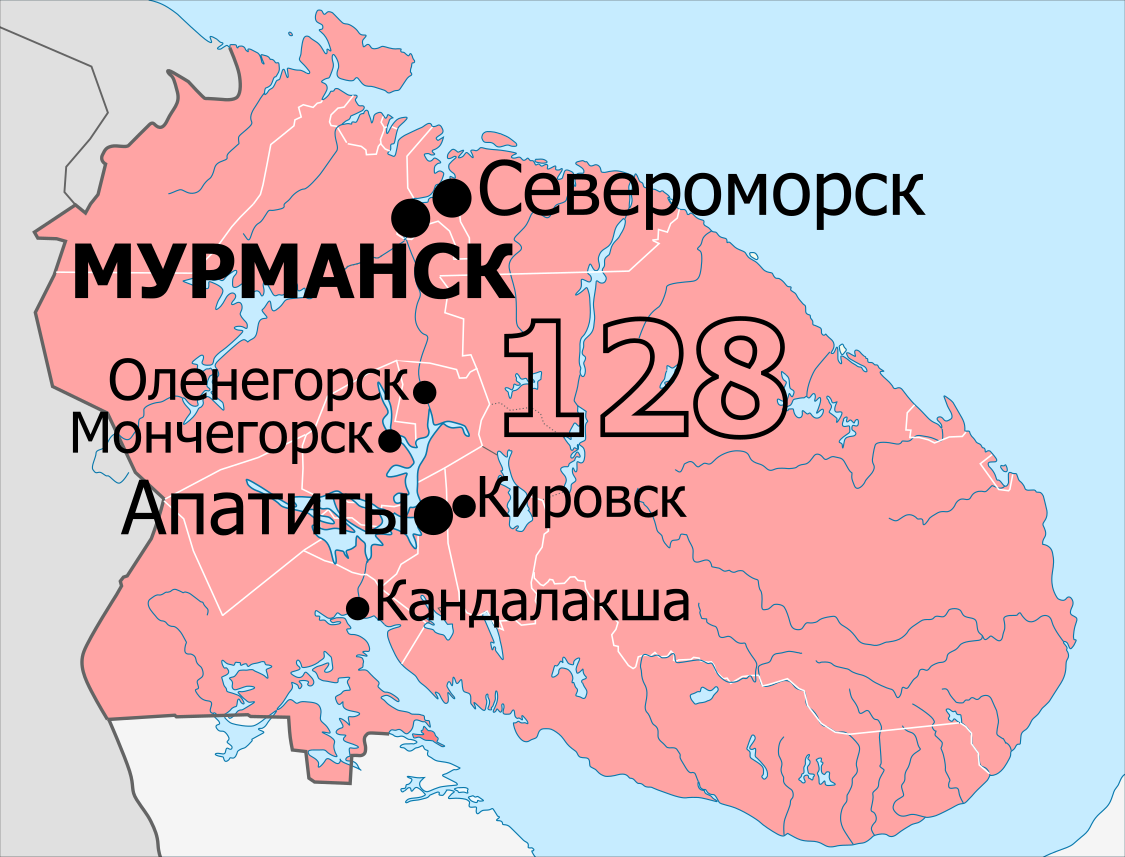
- Deputy: Tatyana Kusayko; United Russia
- Federal subject: Murmansk Oblast
- Districts: Alexandrovsk, Apatity, Kandalakshsky, Kirovsk, Kolsky, Kovdorsky, Lovozersky, Monchegorsk, Murmansk, Olenegorsk, Ostrovnoy, Pechengsky, Polyarnye Zori, Severomorsk, Tersky, Vidyayevo, Zaozyorsk
- Voters: 503,910 (2026)

The Murmansk constituency (No.130 (Note: No.116 in 1993-2007, No.128 in 2016–2026)) is a Russian legislative constituency in Murmansk Oblast. The constituency encompasses the entire territory of Magadan Oblast.

The constituency has been represented since 2021 by United Russia deputy Tatyana Kusayko, former Senator and pediatrician, who won the open seat, succeeding one-term United Russia incumbent Alexey Veller after the latter successfully sought re-election in Yeniseysk constituency.

== Boundaries ==
1993–2003: Lovozersky District, Murmansk, Ostrovnoy, Severomorsk, Tersky District
The constituency covered the cities Murmansk and Severomorsk as well as sparsely populated eastern Murmansk Oblast.

2003–2007, 2016–present: Alexandrovsk, Apatity, Kandalakshsky District, Kirovsk, Kolsky District, Kovdorsky District, Lovozersky District, Monchegorsk, Murmansk, Olenegorsk, Ostrovnoy, Pechengsky District, Polyarnye Zori, Severomorsk, Tersky District, Vidyayevo, Zaozyorsk
The constituency has been covering the entirety of the Murmansk Oblast since 2003 redistricting, absorbing Monchegorsk constituency, as the region lost a second constituency due to population loss.

== Members elected ==
| Election | Member | Party |
|---|---|---|
| 1993 | Andrey Kozyrev | Choice of Russia |
| 1995 | Andrey Kozyrev | Independent |
| 1999 | Vladimir Gusenkov (Note: died in November 2002) | Independent |
| 2003 | Igor Chernyshenko | United Russia |
| 2007 | Proportional representation - no election by constituency | |
| 2011 | Proportional representation - no election by constituency | |
| 2016 | Alexey Veller | United Russia |
| 2021 | Tatyana Kusayko | United Russia |
| 2026 | Tatyana Kusayko | United Russia |

== Election results ==
=== 1993 ===
Summary of the 12 December 1993 Russian legislative election in the Murmansk constituency
| Candidate | Party | Votes | % |
|---|---|---|---|
| Andrey Kozyrev | Choice of Russia | 76,917 | 38.51% |
| Yury Lysenko | Independent | 24,129 | 12.08% |
| Aleksey Zolotkov | Party of Russian Unity and Accord | 19,820 | 9.92% |
| Pavel Sazhinov | Independent | 10,452 | 5.23% |
| Galina Ilyina | Independent | 9,444 | 4.73% |
| Igor Lebedev | Yavlinsky–Boldyrev–Lukin | 6,019 | 3.01% |
| Aleksandr Makarevich | Civic Union | 3,560 | 1.78% |
| Valery Shaposhnikov | Dignity and Charity | 2,717 | 1.36% |
| Vasily Ipatov | Russian Democratic Reform Movement | 2,041 | 1.02% |
| Valery Mararitsa | Independent | 1,433 | 0.72% |
| against all | | 28,851 | 14.44% |
| Total | | 199,757 | 100% |

=== 1995 ===
Summary of the 17 December 1995 Russian legislative election in the Murmansk constituency
| Candidate | Party | Votes | % |
|---|---|---|---|
| Andrey Kozyrev (incumbent) | Independent | 93,029 | 40.04% |
| Lyubov Zhirinovskaya | Liberal Democratic Party | 21,574 | 9.28% |
| Igor Lebedev | Yabloko | 18,352 | 7.90% |
| Igor Chernyshenko | Congress of Russian Communities | 17,126 | 7.37% |
| Yury Tarakanov | Independent | 15,462 | 6.65% |
| Yevgeny Borodich | Independent | 9,418 | 4.05% |
| Vyacheslav Zilanov | Independent | 7,012 | 3.02% |
| Svetlana Vodolazhko | Independent | 5,066 | 2.18% |
| Olga Kiseleva | Independent | 5,019 | 2.16% |
| Aleksandr Lysakov | Pamfilova–Gurov–Lysenko | 3,987 | 1.72% |
| Valery Kuzmin | Agrarian Party | 3,254 | 1.40% |
| Vladislav Loskutov | Social Democrats | 2,931 | 1.26% |
| Oleg Chernobylsky | Independent | 2,644 | 1.14% |
| against all | | 22,769 | 9.80% |
| Total | | 232,363 | 100% |

=== 1999 ===
Summary of the 19 December 1999 Russian legislative election in the Murmansk constituency
| Candidate | Party | Votes | % |
|---|---|---|---|
| Vladimir Gusenkov | Independent | 71,206 | 32.55% |
| Vasily Kalaida | Independent | 36,439 | 16.65% |
| Irina Paykacheva | Yabloko | 29,301 | 13.39% |
| Lyubov Zhirinovskaya | Liberal Democratic Party | 25,137 | 11.49% |
| Tamara Kononenko | Spiritual Heritage | 15,769 | 7.21% |
| Yan Mezentsev | Andrey Nikolayev and Svyatoslav Fyodorov Bloc | 5,576 | 2.55% |
| against all | | 32,527 | 14.87% |
| Total | | 218,788 | 100% |

=== 2003 ===
Summary of the 7 December 2003 Russian legislative election in the Murmansk constituency
| Candidate | Party | Votes | % |
|---|---|---|---|
| Igor Chernyshenko (incumbent) (Note: redistricted from Monchegorsk constituency) | United Russia | 177,191 | 46.04% |
| Vasily Kalaida | Communist Party | 56,509 | 14.68% |
| Rimma Kuruch | Russian Pensioners' Party-Party of Social Justice | 31,366 | 8.15% |
| Igor Lebedev | Yabloko | 24,854 | 6.46% |
| Aleksandr Kudasov | Liberal Democratic Party | 23,218 | 6.03% |
| Aleksandr Voytenko | Independent | 7,401 | 1.92% |
| Vitaly Golovkov | United Russian Party Rus' | 4,483 | 1.16% |
| against all | | 55,394 | 14.39% |
| Total | | 385,308 | 100% |

=== 2016 ===
Summary of the 18 September 2016 Russian legislative election in the Murmansk constituency
| Candidate | Party | Votes | % |
|---|---|---|---|
| Alexey Veller | United Russia | 108,555 | 44.16% |
| Maksim Belov | Liberal Democratic Party | 38,052 | 15.48% |
| Gennady Stepakhno | Communist Party | 31,277 | 12.72% |
| Aleksandr Makarevich | A Just Russia | 26,415 | 10.75% |
| Igor Morar | Civic Platform | 10,804 | 4.39% |
| Oleg Drozdov | Yabloko | 7,431 | 3.02% |
| Sergey Pakhomov | Rodina | 6,781 | 2.76% |
| Andrey Kapitonov | People's Freedom Party | 4,383 | 1.78% |
| Total | | 245,832 | 100% |

=== 2021 ===
Summary of the 17-19 September 2021 Russian legislative election in the Murmansk constituency
| Candidate | Party | Votes | % |
|---|---|---|---|
| Tatyana Kusayko | United Russia | 86,223 | 34.38% |
| Aleksandr Makarevich | A Just Russia — For Truth | 46,852 | 18.68% |
| Valery Yarantsev | Communist Party | 40,828 | 16.28% |
| Stanislav Gontar | Liberal Democratic Party | 23,067 | 9.20% |
| Artyom Maryshev | New People | 21,022 | 8.38% |
| Sergey Yevsyukov | Party of Pensioners | 16,658 | 6.64% |
| Nikolay Palchenko | Party of Growth | 3,394 | 1.35% |
| Total | | 250,787 | 100% |

=== 2026 ===
Summary of the 18-20 September 2026 Russian legislative election in the Murmansk constituency
| Candidate | Party | Votes | % |
|---|---|---|---|
| Tatyana Kusayko (incumbent) | United Russia | 87,275 | 35.36% |
| Maksim Belov | New People | 35,657 | 14.45% |
| Yury Vatalin | Communist Party | 31,815 | 12.89% |
| Stanislav Gontar | Liberal Democratic Party | 24,702 | 10.01% |
| Aleksandr Makarevich | A Just Russia | 24,671 | 10.00% |
| Igor Khomechko | Yabloko | 17,339 | 7.03% |
| Andrey Ivanov | Party of Pensioners | 16,256 | 6.59% |
| Total | | 246,786 | 100% |
