= Flag of Murmansk Oblast =

Murmansk Oblast
- Proportion: 2:3
- Adopted: 1 July 2004
- Design: 2 unequal strips of blue on top and red on bottom, with an aurora in the middle of blue strip
- Designed by: P. Abarin

The flag of Murmansk Oblast in Russia consists of two horizontal bands of blue and red, the blue being four times wider than the red. Within the blue is a stylized yellow aurora, which takes up two fifths of the width of the flag. The aurora represents the fact that the Murmansk Oblast is north of the Arctic Circle. The blue represents beauty and greatness, and the red represents courage and strength. The flag is the winner of a design contest and was officially adopted on 1 July 2004.

== Other flags ==
=== Administrative divisions ===
Flag	Date	Use	Description
	2001–Present	Flag of Severomorsk	
	2005–Present	Flag of Zaozyorsk	
	1998–2005	Flag of Zaozyorsk	
	2006–Present	Flag of Vidyayevo	
	2013–Present	Flag of Apatity	
	2004–Present	Flag of Monchegorsk	
	2016–Present	Flag of Olenegorsk	
	2007–Present	Flag of Kovdorsky District	
	2013–Present	Flag of Kandalakshsky District	
	2018–Present	Flag of Pechengsky District	
	2012–Present	Flag of Tersky District	

=== Settlements ===
Flag	Date	Use	Description
	2010–Present	Flag of Alakurtti	
	2008–Present	Flag of Kandalaksha	
	2016–Present	Flag of Kola	
	2003–2016	Flag of Kola	
	?–Present	Flag of Polyarny	
	2014–Present	Flag of Teriberka	
	2015–Present	Flag of Zelenoborsky	
	2007–Present	Flag of Zapolyarny	
	2012–Present	Flag of Korzunovo	
	2016–Present	Flag of Zarechensk	
	2003–Present	Flag of Snezhnogorsk	
