= Tersky Coast =

Coastal area in Murmansk Oblast, northwestern Russia

Coordinates: 66°09′11″N 37°32′31″E

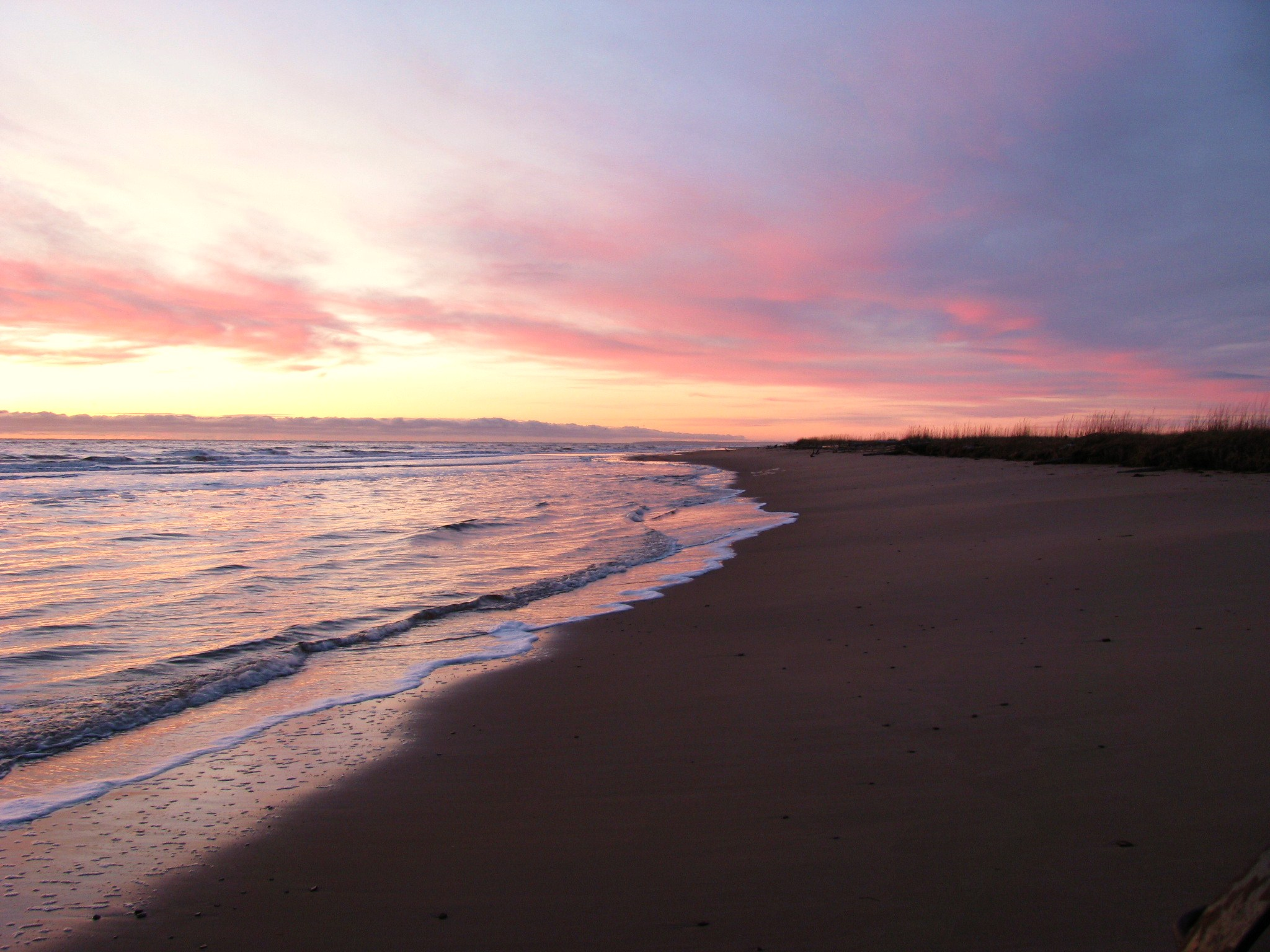
Tersky Coast

The Tersky Coast (Russian: Терский берег) is a coastal area in Murmansk Oblast in northwest Russia. It is located on the northern side of the White Sea, between mouth of Varzuga River and Cape Svyatoy Nos. The major rivers flowing to the sea at the coast are the Ponoy and the Strelna.

Administratively, the Tersky Coast is shared between Lovozersky and Tersky Districts of Murmansk Oblast.

The villages of Olenitsa, Kashkarantsy, Kuzomen, Tetrino, Chapoma, Pyalitsa, Lumbovka are all located at the Tersky Coast. The coast was populated not later than 13th century by the Pomors.

Tersky Coast is included into border security zone, intended to protect the borders of Russian Federation from unwanted activity. In order to visit the zone, a permit issued by the local FSB department is required.
