= Luostari =

Luostari (Russian: Луостари) is the name of several places in Russia:

- Luostari (inhabited locality), an inhabited locality Korzunovsky Territorial Okrug, Pechengsky District, Murmansk Oblast
- Luotsari-New (Луостари-Новое), former name of Korzunovo, Pechengsky District, Murmansk Oblast
- Luostari (railway station), an inhabited locality classified as a railway station in Korzunovsky Territorial Okrug of Pechengsky District of Murmansk Oblast
- Luostari airfield, former military airbase
