= Slyuda =

Slyuda (Russian: Слюда) is the name of several rural localities in Russia:

- Slyuda, Chelyabinsk Oblast, a village in Fershampenuazsky Selsoviet of Nagaybaksky District of Chelyabinsk Oblast
- Slyuda, Murmansk Oblast, a former inhabited locality in Yensky Territorial Okrug of Kovdorsky District of Murmansk Oblast; abolished in November 2007
- Micuda, a village in the Nagaybak district of the Chelyabinsk region.
