= Olenya Guba =

Olenya Guba may refer to:

- Olenya Guba (rural locality), a rural locality under the administrative jurisdiction of the closed administrative-territorial formation of Alexandrovsk in Murmansk Oblast, Russia
- Olenya Guba, alternative name of Olenya Bay, a naval base in Russia
