= Terky =

Terky may refer to:

- Tersky gorod, or Terky, a Russian military stronghold on the North Caucasus Line (16–18 c.)

== See also ==
- Terki (disambiguation)
- Tersky (disambiguation)
- Turki
