= Putevaya Usadba 9 km zheleznoy dorogi Luostari–Nikel =

Putevaya Usadba devyat kilometrov zheleznoy dorogi Luostari–Nikel Путевая Усадьба девять километров железной дороги Луостари–Никель
- Inhabited locality
- Interactive map of Putevaya Usadba devyat kilometrov zheleznoy dorogi Luostari–Nikel
- Location of Putevaya Usadba devyat kilometrov zheleznoy dorogi Luostari–Nikel Putevaya Usadba devyat kilometrov zheleznoy dorogi Luostari–Nikel (Murmansk Oblast)
- Coordinates: 69°23′03″N 30°58′48″E
- Country: Russia
- Federal subject: Murmansk Oblast
- Administrative district: Pechengsky District
- Territorial okrugSelsoviet: Korzunovsky Territorial Okrug

Population (2010 Census)
  - Total: 0
  - Estimate (2021): 1 )

Municipal status
  - Municipal district: Pechengsky Municipal District
  - Rural settlement: Korzunovo Rural Settlement
- Time zone: UTC+3 (MSK)
- Postal code: 184405
- Dialing code: +7 81554
- OKTMO ID: 47615406111

Putevaya Usadba devyat kilometrov zheleznoy dorogi Luostari–Nikel (Russian: Путевая Усадьба девять километров железной дороги Луостари–Никель) is an uninhabited rural locality in Pechengsky District of Murmansk Oblast, Russia, located beyond the Arctic Circle. As of the 2010 Census, its population was 0.

== Name ==
The locality's name translates to "Traveling Estate Nine Kilometers of the Luostari–Nikel Railway"

== Geography ==
The locality is located on the banks of the river Pechenga. It is located above the settlement of Semuzhnaya. Its closest large settlement is Korzunovo, which is 1 km away. Other nearby settlements are Luostari (4 km away) and Zapolyarny (7 km). Zapolyarny is the closest town.

== Transport ==
The locality is home to a stop on the Murmansk–Nikel Railway. It is just south of the Korzunovo Aerodrome. The aerodrome has since been abandoned and is proposed to be turned into a wealthy neighborhood.
