= Magnetity =

Magnetity Магнетиты
- Railway station
- Interactive map of Magnetity
- Location of Magnetity Magnetity (Murmansk Oblast)
- Coordinates: 68°41′00″N 33°07′32″E
- Country: Russia
- Federal subject: Murmansk Oblast
- Administrative district: Kolsky District
- Urban-type settlementSelsoviet: Kildinstroy

Population (2010 Census)
  - Total: 124
  - Estimate (2021): 38 (−69.4%)

Municipal status
  - Municipal district: Kolsky Municipal District
  - Urban settlement: Kildinstroy Urban Settlement
- Time zone: UTC+3 (MSK)
- Postal code: 184350
- Dialing code: +7 81553
- OKTMO ID: 47605158121

Magnetity (Russian: Магнетиты) is a rural locality (a railway station) under the administrative jurisdiction of the urban-type settlement of Kildinstroy in Kolsky District of Murmansk Oblast, Russia, located beyond the Arctic Circle. Population: 124 (2010 Census).
