= Shonguy =

Shonguy Шонгуй
- Inhabited locality
- Interactive map of Shonguy
- Location of Shonguy Shonguy (Murmansk Oblast)
- Coordinates: 68°44′56″N 33°09′22″E
- Country: Russia
- Federal subject: Murmansk Oblast
- Administrative district: Kolsky District
- Urban-type settlementSelsoviet: Kildinstroy
- Founded: 1920s

Population (2010 Census)
  - Total: 1,038
  - Estimate (2021): 750 (−27.7%)

Municipal status
  - Municipal district: Kolsky Municipal District
  - Urban settlement: Kildinstroy Urban Settlement
- Time zone: UTC+3 (MSK)
- Postal code: 184368
- Dialing code: +7 81553
- OKTMO ID: 47605158106

Shonguy (Russian: Шонгуй) is a rural locality (an inhabited locality) under the administrative jurisdiction of the urban-type settlement of Kildinstroy in Kolsky District of Murmansk Oblast, Russia, located on the Kola Peninsula beyond the Arctic Circle. Population: 1,038 (2010 Census).
