= 27 km =

27 km may refer to the following places in Russia:

- 27 km, Orenburg Oblast, a rural locality (a crossing) in Orenburg Oblast, Russia
- 27 km Zheleznoy Dorogi Monchegorsk–Olenya, a rural locality in Murmansk Oblast, Russia
