= Golubye Ruchyi =

Golubye Ruchyi Голубые Ручьи
- Inhabited locality
- Interactive map of Golubye Ruchyi
- Location of Golubye Ruchyi Golubye Ruchyi (Murmansk Oblast)
- Coordinates: 68°45′23″N 33°01′04″E
- Country: Russia
- Federal subject: Murmansk Oblast
- Administrative district: Kolsky District
- Urban-type settlementSelsoviet: Kildinstroy

Population (2010 Census)
  - Total: 447
  - Estimate (2021): 0 (−100%)

Municipal status
  - Municipal district: Kolsky Municipal District
  - Urban settlement: Kildinstroy Urban Settlement
- Time zone: UTC+3 (MSK)
- Postal code: 184367
- Dialing code: +7 81553
- OKTMO ID: 47605158111

Golubye Ruchyi (Russian: Голубы́е Ручьи́) is a rural locality (an inhabited locality) under the administrative jurisdiction of the urban-type settlement of Kildinstroy in Kolsky District of Murmansk Oblast, Russia, located on the Kola Peninsula beyond the Arctic Circle at a height of 10 meters (33 ft) above sea level. Population: 447 (2010 Census).
