= Nyal =

Nyal Нял
- Railway station
- Interactive map of Nyal
- Location of Nyal Nyal (Murmansk Oblast)
- Coordinates: 69°05′N 32°10′E
- Country: Russia
- Federal subject: Murmansk Oblast
- Administrative district: Kolsky District
- Territorial okrugSelsoviet: Tulomsky Territorial Okrug

Population (2010 Census)
  - Total: 7
  - Estimate (2021): 1 (−85.7%)

Municipal status
  - Municipal district: Kolsky Municipal District
  - Rural settlement: Tuloma Rural Settlement
- Time zone: UTC+3 (MSK)
- Postal code: 184380
- OKTMO ID: 47605406106

Nyal (Russian: Нял - from Sámi - Arctic fox) is a rural locality (a railway station) in Tuloma Rural Settlement of Kolsky District of Murmansk Oblast, Russia, located beyond the Arctic Circle at 66 km of Kola - Pechenga Railway, near Nyalyavr Lake.

It was founded in 1955 as a hub station for Nyal - Zaozyorsk Railway.

Population: 52 (65 % of russians, 2002 Census), 7 (2010 Census).

In 2015, the rural locality was resettled — the inhabitants were resettled in Pyayve. The commuter train has been cancelled.
