= Putevye Usadby 1331 km =

Putevye Usadby 1331 km Путевые Усадьбы 1331 км
- Inhabited locality (abolished)
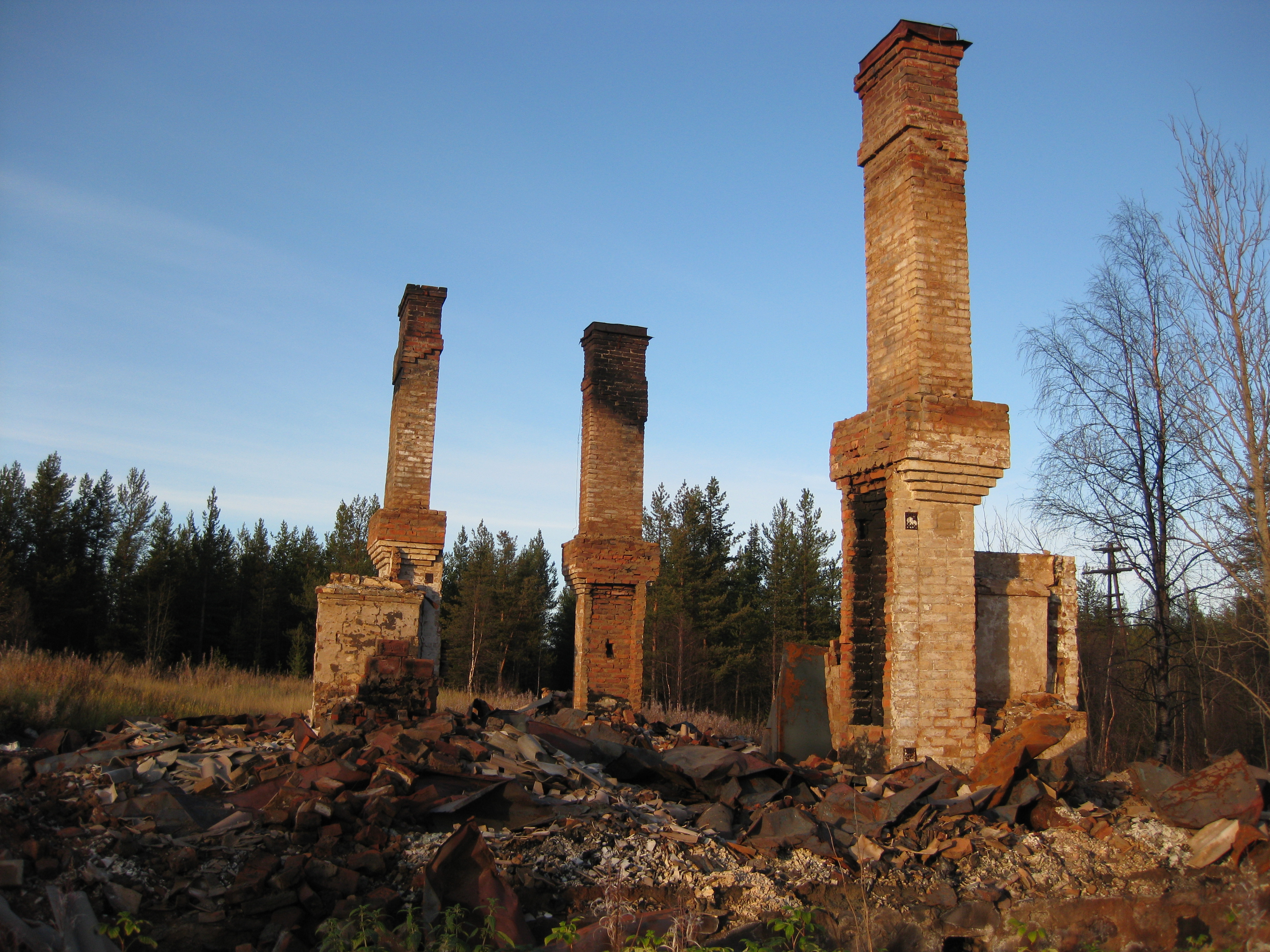
- Destroyed building
- Interactive map of Putevye Usadby 1331 km
- Location of Putevye Usadby 1331 km Putevye Usadby 1331 km (Murmansk Oblast)
- Coordinates: 68°5′49″N 33°19′50″E
- Country: Russia
- Federal subject: Murmansk Oblast
- Founded: 1930s
- Abolished: 23 November 2009

Population
  - Estimate (2005): 1 )
- Postal code: 184533
- Dialing code: +7 81552

Putevye Usadby 1331 km (Russian: Путевые Усадьбы 1331 км) was a rural inhabited locality under the administrative jurisdiction of the town of Olenegorsk, Murmansk Oblast, Russia. It was located beyond the Arctic Circle, on the Kola Peninsula.

In 2005, only one person lived in the locality. Due to depopulation, the locality was abolished on 23 November 2009, along with Goryachiye Ruchyi, Mokket, Ostrov Kharlov and Zubovka.
