= Retinskoye =

Retinskoye Ретинское
- Inhabited locality
- Interactive map of Retinskoye
- Location of Retinskoye Retinskoye (Murmansk Oblast)
- Coordinates: 69°07′N 33°23′E
- Country: Russia
- Federal subject: Murmansk Oblast
- Founded: 1933

Population (2010 Census)
  - Total: 0
  - Estimate (2010): 0 )

Administrative status
  - Subordinated to: Closed Administrative-Territorial Formation of Alexandrovsk

Municipal status
  - Urban okrug: Alexandrovsk Urban Okrug
- Time zone: UTC+3 (MSK)
- Postal code: 184650
- Dialing code: +7 81551
- OKTMO ID: 47605402108

Retinskoye (Russian: Ретинское) is a rural locality (an inhabited locality) in administrative jurisdiction of the closed administrative-territorial formation of Alexandrovsk in Murmansk Oblast, Russia, located beyond the Arctic Circle at a height of 1 meter (3 ft 3 in) above sea level. As of the 2010 Census, it had no recorded population.
