= Tersky =

Tersky (masculine), Terskaya (feminine), or Terskoye (neuter) may refer to:

- Tersky District, the name of several districts in Russia
- Tersky (rural locality) (Terskaya, Terskoye), the name of several rural localities in Russia

== See also ==
- Tersk (disambiguation)
- Terek Oblast, or Tersk Oblast (Russian: Те́рская о́бласть, romanized: Térskaya óblast), a former province (oblast) of the Caucasus Viceroyalty of the Russian Empire (1873-1917)
