= Mishukovo, Murmansk Oblast =

Mishukovo Мишуково
- Inhabited locality
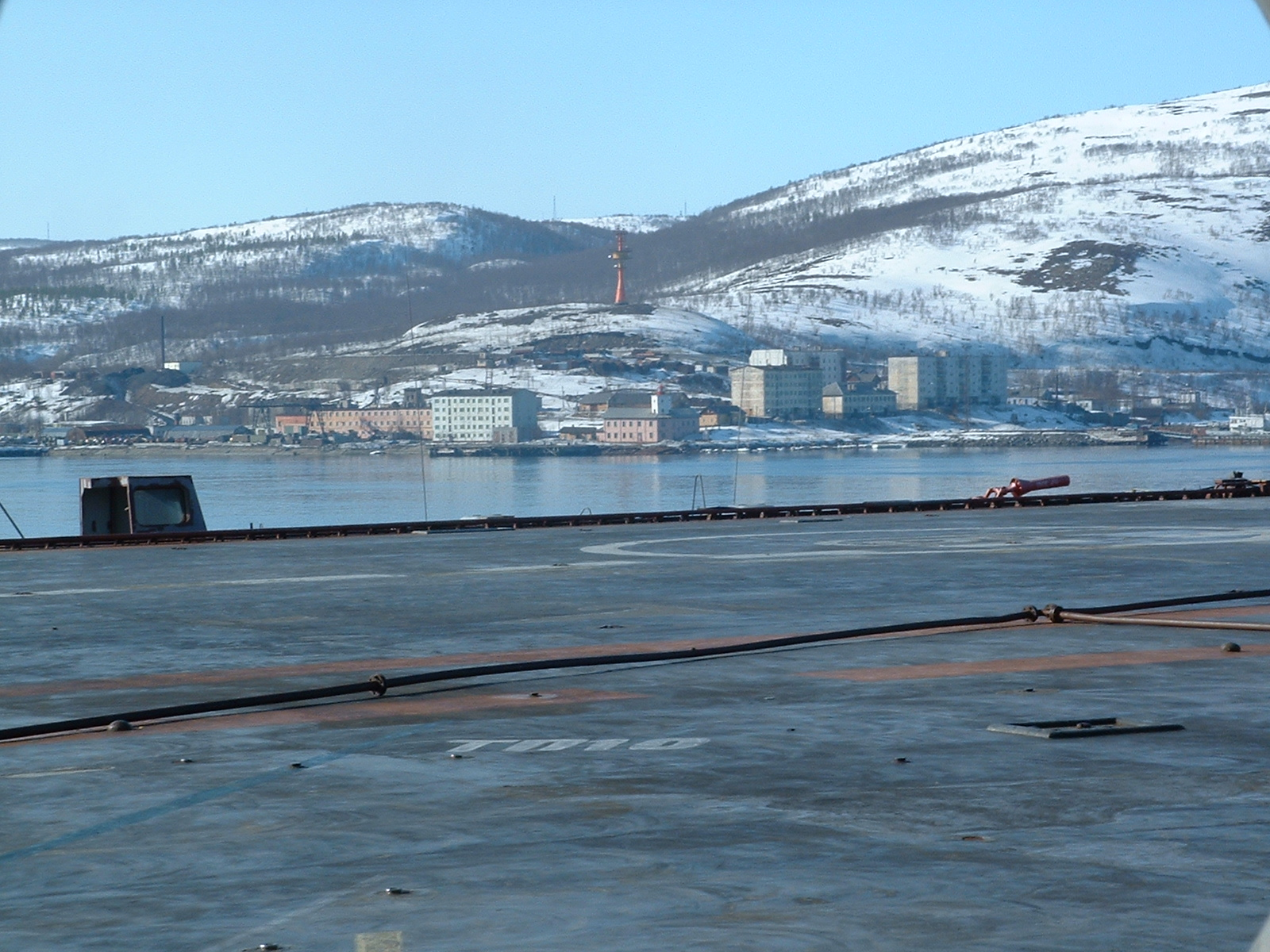
- Роста. Мишуково с палубы Кузнецова
- Interactive map of Mishukovo
- Location of Mishukovo Mishukovo (Murmansk Oblast)
- Coordinates: 69°03′N 33°03′E
- Country: Russia
- Federal subject: Murmansk Oblast
- Administrative district: Kolsky District
- Territorial okrugSelsoviet: Mezhdurechensky Territorial Okrug

Population (2010 Census)
  - Total: 211
  - Estimate (2021): 160 (−24.2%)

Municipal status
  - Municipal district: Kolsky Municipal District
  - Rural settlement: Mezhdurechye Rural Settlement
- Time zone: UTC+3 (MSK)
- Postal code: 184345
- Dialing code: +7 81553
- OKTMO ID: 47605402111

Mishukovo (Russian: Мишуково) is a rural locality (an inhabited locality) in Kolsky District of Murmansk Oblast, Russia, located beyond the Arctic Circle at a height of 1 meter (3 ft 3 in) above sea level. Population: 211 (2010 Census).
