= Mayak Tyuvagubsky =

Abolished inhabited locality in Murmansk Oblast, Russia

Mayak Tyuvagubsky Маяк Тювагубский
- Inhabited locality (abolished)
- Interactive map of Mayak Tyuvagubsky
- Location of Mayak Tyuvagubsky Mayak Tyuvagubsky (Murmansk Oblast)
- Coordinates: 69°11′36″N 33°34′42″E
- Country: Russia
- Federal subject: Murmansk Oblast
- Administrative district: Kolsky District
- Territorial okrugSelsoviet: Teribersky Territorial Okrug
- Abolished: April 26, 2013
- Elevation: 55 m (180 ft)

Population (2010 Census)
  - Total: 0
  - Estimate (2010): 0 )

Municipal status
  - Municipal district: Kolsky Municipal District
  - Urban settlement: Teriberka Rural Settlement
- Postal code: 184600
- Dialing code: +7 81553

Mayak Tyuvagubsky (Russian: Маяк Тювагубский, lit. 'Lighthouse of Tyuva Bay') was a rural locality in Teribersky Territorial Okrug of Kolsky District of Murmansk Oblast, Russia. It was located on the Kola Peninsula, beyond the Arctic Circle and 16 km from Severomorsk at a height of 55 meters (180 ft) above sea level, near Tyuva Bay.

It was founded in 1959 as a rural-type settlement near the lighthouse.

It was recorded with a population of 30 in the 2002 census, 94% of which were ethnic Russians. By the 2010 census, its population was 0. Due to the aforementioned depopulation, its government designation as a locality was abolished effective April 26, 2013.
