= Kuropta =

Kuropta Куропта
- Inhabited locality
- Interactive map of Kuropta
- Location of Kuropta Kuropta (Murmansk Oblast)
- Coordinates: 67°29′N 30°41′E
- Country: Russia
- Federal subject: Murmansk Oblast
- Administrative district: Kovdorsky District
- Territorial okrugSelsoviet: Yonsky Territorial Okrug
- Elevation: 213 m (699 ft)

Population (2010 Census)
  - Total: 90
  - Estimate (2021): 30 (−66.7%)

Municipal status
  - Urban okrug: Kovdorsky Urban Okrug
- Time zone: UTC+3 (MSK)
- Postal code: 184130
- Dialing code: +7 81535
- OKTMO ID: 47703000116

Kuropta (Russian: Куропта) is a rural locality (an inhabited locality) in Kovdorsky District of Murmansk Oblast, Russia, located beyond the Arctic Circle at a height of 213 meters (699 ft) above sea level. Population: 90 (2010 Census).
