= Taybola =

Taybola Тайбола
- Station
- Interactive map of Taybola
- Location of Taybola Taybola (Murmansk Oblast)
- Coordinates: 68°25′59″N 33°22′0″E
- Country: Russia
- Federal subject: Murmansk Oblast
- Administrative district: Kolsky District

Population (2010 Census)
  - Total: 14
  - Estimate (2021): 25 (+78.6%)
- Time zone: UTC+3 (MSK)
- Postal code: 184321
- Dialing code: +7 81553
- OKTMO ID: 47605404121

Taybola (Russian: Тайбола) is the rural locality (a Station) in Kolsky District of Murmansk Oblast, Russia. The village is located beyond the Arctic Circle, on the Kola Peninsula. Located at a height of 78 m above sea level.
