= Zapadny Kildin =

Zapadny Kildin Западный Кильдин
- Posyolok
- Interactive map of Zapadny Kildin
- Location of Zapadny Kildin Zapadny Kildin (Murmansk Oblast)
- Coordinates: 69°20′13″N 34°4′40″E
- Country: Russia
- Federal subject: Murmansk Oblast
- Administrative district: Kolsky District

Population (2010 Census)
  - Total: 6
  - Estimate (2021): 0 (−100%)
- Time zone: UTC+3 (MSK)
- Postal code: 184616
- Dialing code: +7 81553
- OKTMO ID: 47605405111

Zapadny Kildin (Russian: Западный Кильдин) is the rural locality (a Posyolok) in Kolsky District of Murmansk Oblast, Russia. The village is located north of the Arctic Circle, on the Kildin Island. It is located at a height of 1 m above sea level.
