= Svetly, Murmansk Oblast =

Arctic village in Murmansk, Russia

Svetly Светлый
- Posyolok
- Interactive map of Svetly
- Location of Svetly Svetly (Murmansk Oblast)
- Coordinates: 68°33′23″N 28°57′12″E
- Country: Russia
- Federal subject: Murmansk Oblast
- Administrative district: Kolsky District

Population (2010 Census)
  - Total: 4
  - Estimate (2025): 6 (+50%)
- Time zone: UTC+3 (MSK)
- Postal code: 184374
- Dialing code: +7 81553
- OKTMO ID: 47605154106

Svetly (Russian: Светлый) is the rural locality (a Posyolok) in Kolsky District of Murmansk Oblast, Russia. The village is located beyond the Arctic Circle.
