= Vostochnoye Munozero =

Vostochnoye Munozero Восточное Мунозеро
- Inhabited locality
- Interactive map of Vostochnoye Munozero
- Location of Vostochnoye Munozero Vostochnoye Munozero (Murmansk Oblast)
- Coordinates: 67°02′N 34°48′E
- Country: Russia
- Federal subject: Murmansk Oblast
- Administrative district: Tersky District

Population (2010 Census)
  - Total: 0
  - Estimate (2010): 0 )

Municipal status
  - Municipal district: Tersky Municipal District
  - Urban settlement: Umba Urban Settlement
- Time zone: UTC+3 (MSK)
- Postal code: 184702
- Dialing code: +7 81559
- OKTMO ID: 47620151106

Vostochnoye Munozero (Russian: Восточное Мунозеро) is a rural locality (an inhabited locality) in Tersky District of Murmansk Oblast, Russia, located beyond the Arctic Circle on the Kola Peninsula at a height of 147 meters (482 ft) above sea level. Population: 0 (2010 Census).
