= Pushnoy, Murmansk Oblast =

Pushnoy Пушной
- Inhabited locality
- Interactive map of Pushnoy
- Location of Pushnoy Pushnoy (Murmansk Oblast)
- Coordinates: 68°29′N 33°20′E
- Country: Russia
- Federal subject: Murmansk Oblast
- Administrative district: Kolsky District
- Territorial okrugSelsoviet: Pushnovsky Territorial Okrug

Population (2010 Census)
  - Total: 782
  - Estimate (2021): 731 (−6.5%)

Municipal status
  - Municipal district: Kolsky Municipal District
  - Urban settlement: Pushnoy Rural Settlement
- Time zone: UTC+3 (MSK)
- Postal code: 184321
- Dialing code: +7 81553
- OKTMO ID: 47605404101

Pushnoy (Russian: Пушно́й) is a rural locality (an inhabited locality) in Pushnovsky Territorial Okrug of Kolsky District of Murmansk Oblast, Russia, located on the Kola Peninsula beyond the Arctic Circle at a height of 131 meters (430 ft) above sea level. Population: 782 (2010 Census).
