= Nivankyul =

Abolished inhabited locality in Murmansk Oblast, Russia

Coordinates: 68°21′06″N 30°43′04″E

Nivankyul (Russian: Ниванкюль) was a rural locality (an inhabited locality) in Kolsky District of Murmansk Oblast, Russia. It was located beyond the Arctic Circle at a height of 69 meters (226 ft) above sea level. It was abolished by the Law of Murmansk Oblast #995-01-ZMO of July 2, 2008.

The name of Nivankyul is of Finnish origin (Nivankylä), derived from the words niva "small rapids" and kylä "village". The Russian name has also been spelled as Nivankyulya (Ниванкюля).

The village was established by Finnish immigrants at the mouth of the river Nota (Nuorttijoki) in 1868 or 1879. In 1926, it had a population of 47, increasing to 60 by 1938. An animal husbandry and fishing kolkhoz was established in the same year. The village was moved to the other side of the river in 1963 as its old site would be submerged by the Verkhnetulomsky Reservoir. The settlement had 11 inhabitants in 2002 and was abolished in 2008 due to its low population.
