= Rikolatva =

Rikolatva Риколатва
- Posyolok
- Interactive map of Rikolatva
- Location of Rikolatva Rikolatva (Murmansk Oblast)
- Coordinates: 67°29′39″N 31°18′38″E
- Country: Russia
- Federal subject: Murmansk Oblast
- Administrative district: Kovdor
- Founded: 1939
- Elevation: 271 m (889 ft)

Population (2010 Census)
  - Total: 193
  - Estimate (2002): 171 (−11.4%)
- Time zone: UTC+3 (MSK)
- Postal code: 184121
- Dialing code: +7 81535
- OKTMO ID: 47703000111

Rikolatva (Russian: Риколатва) is the rural locality (a Posyolok) in Kovdor municipality of Murmansk Oblast, Russia. The village is located beyond the Arctic Circle. Located at a height of 271 m above sea level.

Ricolatva may be closed because of the bankruptcy of the main industries of the village. At the moment its population is 171, although it was 420 in 2002.
