= Chan-Ruchey =

Chan-Ruchey Чан-Ручей
- Posyolok
- Interactive map of Chan-Ruchey
- Location of Chan-Ruchey Chan-Ruchey (Murmansk Oblast)
- Coordinates: 69°16′38″N 32°53′41″E
- Country: Russia
- Federal subject: Murmansk Oblast
- Administrative district: Vidyayevo
- Elevation: 48 m (157 ft)

Population (2010 Census)
  - Total: 0
  - Estimate (2023): 0 )
- Time zone: UTC+3 (MSK)
- Postal code: 184372
- Dialing code: +7 81553
- OKTMO ID: 47735000106

Chan-Ruchey (Russian: Чан-Ручей) is a rural locality (a Posyolok) in Vidyayevo municipality of Murmansk Oblast, Russia. The village is located beyond the Arctic Circle, on the Kola Peninsula. It is 48 m above sea level.

As of the 2010 census, Chan-Ruchey was uninhabited.
