= Indel (rural locality) =

Indel Индель
- Inhabited locality
- Interactive map of Indel
- Location of Indel Indel (Murmansk Oblast)
- Coordinates: 66°58′N 35°18′E
- Country: Russia
- Federal subject: Murmansk Oblast
- Administrative district: Tersky District
- Elevation: 125 m (410 ft)

Population (2010 Census)
  - Total: 0
  - Estimate (2010): 0 )

Municipal status
  - Municipal district: Tersky Municipal District
  - Urban settlement: Umba Urban Settlement
- Time zone: UTC+3 (MSK)
- Postal code: 184703
- OKTMO ID: 47620151111

Indel (Russian: Индель) was a rural locality (an inhabited locality) in Tersky District of Murmansk Oblast, Russia, located beyond the Arctic Circle on the Kola Peninsula at a height of 125 meters (410 ft) above sea level. Population: 0 (2010 Census).
