= Tersk =

Tersk may refer to:

- Tersk Stud, a horse breeding farm in Russia owned and operated by the Russian government
- Tersk horse, a breed of horse developed at Tersk

== See also ==
- Tersky (disambiguation)
