= Mayak Nikodimsky =

Mayak Nikodimsky Маяк Никодимский
- Inhabited locality
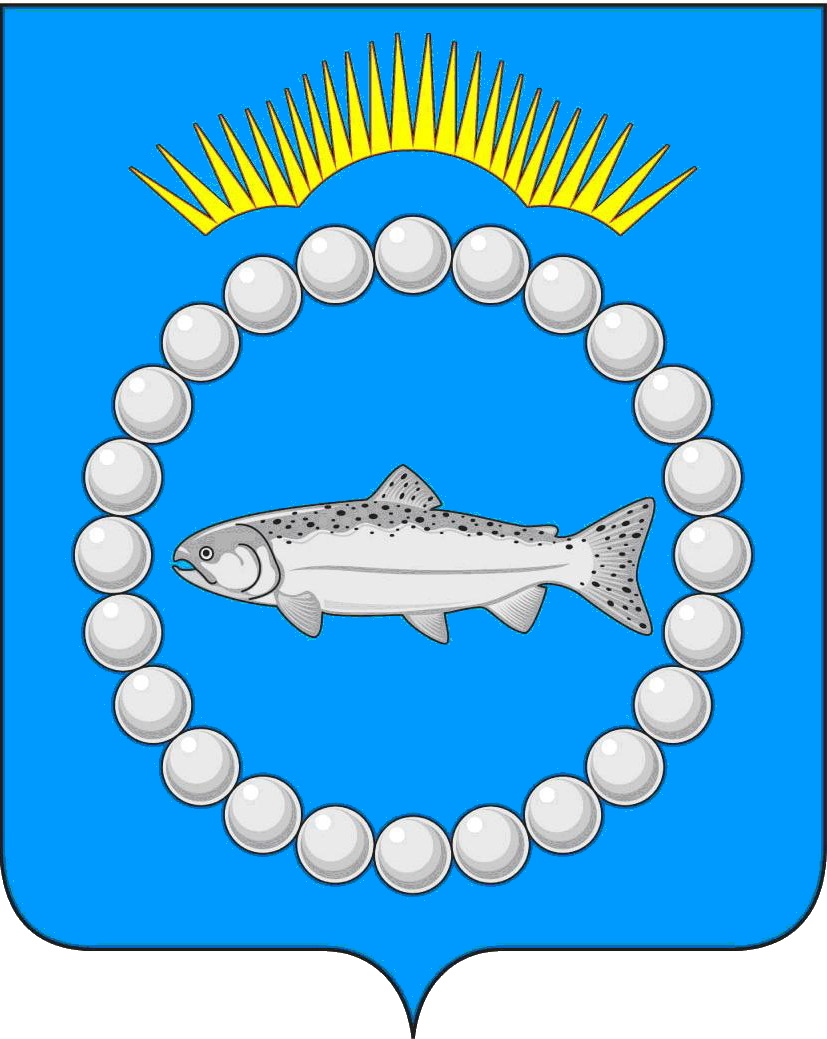
- Coat of arms
- Interactive map of Mayak Nikodimsky
- Location of Mayak Nikodimsky Mayak Nikodimsky (Murmansk Oblast)
- Coordinates: 66°06′24″N 39°06′48″E
- Country: Russia
- Federal subject: Murmansk Oblast
- Administrative district: Tersky District

Population (2010 Census)
  - Total: 3
  - Estimate (2021): 0 (−100%)

Municipal status
  - Municipal district: Tersky Municipal District
  - Rural settlement: Varzuga Rural Settlement
- Time zone: UTC+3 (MSK)
- Postal code: 184716
- Dialing code: +7 81559
- OKTMO ID: 47620401106

Mayak Nikodimsky (Russian: Маяк Никодимский) is a rural locality (an inhabited locality) in Tersky District of Murmansk Oblast, Russia, located on the Kola Peninsula at a height of 1 meter (3 ft 3 in) above sea level. According to 2010 Census, it had a population of 3.
