= Ostrov Bolshoy Oleny =

Ostrov Bolshoy Oleny Остров Большой Олений
- Inhabited locality
- Interactive map of Ostrov Bolshoy Oleny
- Location of Ostrov Bolshoy Oleny Ostrov Bolshoy Oleny (Murmansk Oblast)
- Coordinates: 69°05′N 36°22′E
- Country: Russia
- Federal subject: Murmansk Oblast
- Administrative district: Kolsky District
- Territorial okrugSelsoviet: Teribersky Territorial Okrug

Population (2010 Census)
  - Total: 6
  - Estimate (2021): 0 (−100%)

Municipal status
  - Municipal district: Kolsky Municipal District
  - Urban settlement: Teriberka Rural Settlement
- Time zone: UTC+3 (MSK)
- Postal code: 184600
- Dialing code: +7 81553
- OKTMO ID: 47605405126

Ostrov Bolshoy Oleny (Russian: О́стров Большо́й Оле́ний) is a rural locality (an inhabited locality) in Teribersky Territorial Okrug of Kolsky District of Murmansk Oblast, Russia, located on the Kola Peninsula beyond the Arctic Circle at a height of 31 meters (102 ft) above sea level. Located 150 km east of Murmansk.

Population: 6 (2010 Census).

This village is located on the Bolshoy Oleny Island, which gave its name to the village. The island is located about 150 km to the east of Murmansk. Not to be confused with another Bolshoy Oleny Island located about 35 km to the north of Murmansk; it is the location of an important Bronze Age archaeological site.
