= Dalniye Zelentsy =

Dalniye Zelentsy Дальние Зеленцы
- Inhabited locality
- Interactive map of Dalniye Zelentsy
- Location of Dalniye Zelentsy Dalniye Zelentsy (Murmansk Oblast)
- Coordinates: 69°06′56″N 36°04′10″E
- Country: Russia
- Federal subject: Murmansk Oblast
- Administrative district: Kolsky District
- Territorial okrugSelsoviet: Teribersky Territorial Okrug

Population (2010 Census)
  - Total: 52
  - Estimate (2021): 19 (−63.5%)

Municipal status
  - Municipal district: Kolsky Municipal District
  - Urban settlement: Teriberka Rural Settlement
- Time zone: UTC+3 (MSK)
- Postal code: 184630
- Dialing code: +7 81553
- OKTMO ID: 47605405106

Dalniye Zelentsy (Russian: Дальние Зеленцы) is a rural locality (an inhabited locality) in Teribersky Territorial Okrug of Kolsky District of Murmansk Oblast, Russia, located on the Kola Peninsula beyond the Arctic Circle at a height of 38 meters (125 ft) above sea level. Population: 52 (2010 Census).
