= Yonsky =

Yonsky Ёнский
- Posyolok
- Interactive map of Yonsky
- Location of Yonsky Yonsky (Murmansk Oblast)
- Coordinates: 67°34′50″N 31°9′24″E
- Country: Russia
- Federal subject: Murmansk Oblast
- Administrative district: Kovdor
- Founded: 1950
- Elevation: 142 m (466 ft)

Population (2010 Census)
  - Total: 1,534
  - Estimate (2002): 2,026 (+32.1%)
- Time zone: UTC+3 (MSK)
- Postal code: 184120
- Dialing code: +7 81535
- OKTMO ID: 47703000106

Yonsky (Russian: Ёнский) is the rural locality (a Posyolok) in Kovdor municipality of Murmansk Oblast, Russia. The village is located beyond the Arctic Circle. Located at a height of 142 m above sea level.
