= Mezhdurechye, Murmansk Oblast =

Mezhdurechye Междуречье
- Posyolok
- Interactive map of Mezhdurechye
- Location of Mezhdurechye Mezhdurechye (Murmansk Oblast)
- Coordinates: 69°2′30″N 32°54′29″E
- Country: Russia
- Federal subject: Murmansk Oblast
- Administrative district: Kolsky District

Population (2010 Census)
  - Total: 975
  - Estimate (2021): 750 (−23.1%)
- Time zone: UTC+3 (MSK)
- Postal code: 184363
- Dialing code: +7 81553
- OKTMO ID: 47605402101

Mezhdurechye (Russian: Междуре́чье) is a rural locality (a Posyolok) in Kolsky District of Murmansk Oblast, Russia. The village is located beyond the Arctic Circle, on the Kola Peninsula. It is 43 m above sea level.
