= Leypi =

Leypi Лейпи
- Inhabited locality
- Interactive map of Leypi
- Location of Leypi Leypi (Murmansk Oblast)
- Coordinates: 67°30′N 30°43′E
- Country: Russia
- Federal subject: Murmansk Oblast
- Administrative district: Kovdorsky District
- Territorial okrugSelsoviet: Yonsky Territorial Okrug
- Elevation: 210 m (690 ft)

Population (2010 Census)
  - Total: 346
  - Estimate (2021): 201 (−41.9%)

Municipal status
  - Urban okrug: Kovdorsky Urban Okrug
- Time zone: UTC+3 (MSK)
- Postal code: 184131
- Dialing code: +7 81535
- OKTMO ID: 47703000121

Leypi (Russian: Лейпи) is a rural locality (an inhabited locality) in Kovdorsky District of Murmansk Oblast, Russia, located beyond the Arctic Circle at a height of 210 meters (690 ft) above sea level. Population: 346 (2010 Census).
