= Pirenga =

Pirenga Пиренга
- Posyolok
- Interactive map of Pirenga
- Location of Pirenga Pirenga (Murmansk Oblast)
- Coordinates: 67°33′15″N 32°17′52″E
- Country: Russia
- Federal subject: Murmansk Oblast
- Administrative district: Polyarnye Zori
- Elevation: 137 m (449 ft)

Population
  - Estimate (2002): 15 )
- Postal code: 184225
- Dialing code: +7 81532

Pirenga (Russian: Пиренга) is a rural locality (a Posyolok) in Polyarnye Zori municipality of Murmansk Oblast, Russia. The village is located beyond the Arctic Circle, on the Kola Peninsula. It is 137 m above sea level.
