= Tik-Guba =

Tik-Guba Тик-Губа
- Posyolok
- Interactive map of Tik-Guba
- Location of Tik-Guba Tik-Guba (Murmansk Oblast)
- Coordinates: 67°33′11″N 33°19′59″E
- Country: Russia
- Federal subject: Murmansk Oblast
- Administrative district: Apatity
- Founded: 1924
- Elevation: 121 m (397 ft)

Population (2010 Census)
  - Total: 2
  - Estimate (2002): 12 (+500%)
- Time zone: UTC+3 (MSK)
- Postal code: 184209
- Dialing code: +7 81555
- OKTMO ID: 47705000106

Tik-Guba (Russian: Тик-Губа) is the rural locality (a Posyolok) in Apatity municipality of Murmansk Oblast, Russia. The village is located beyond the Arctic Circle, on the Kola Peninsula. Located at a height of 121 m above sea level.
