= Luostari airfield =

Airstrip in Murmansk Oblast, Russia

Luostari
- Луостари
- Luostari, Murmansk Oblast in Russia
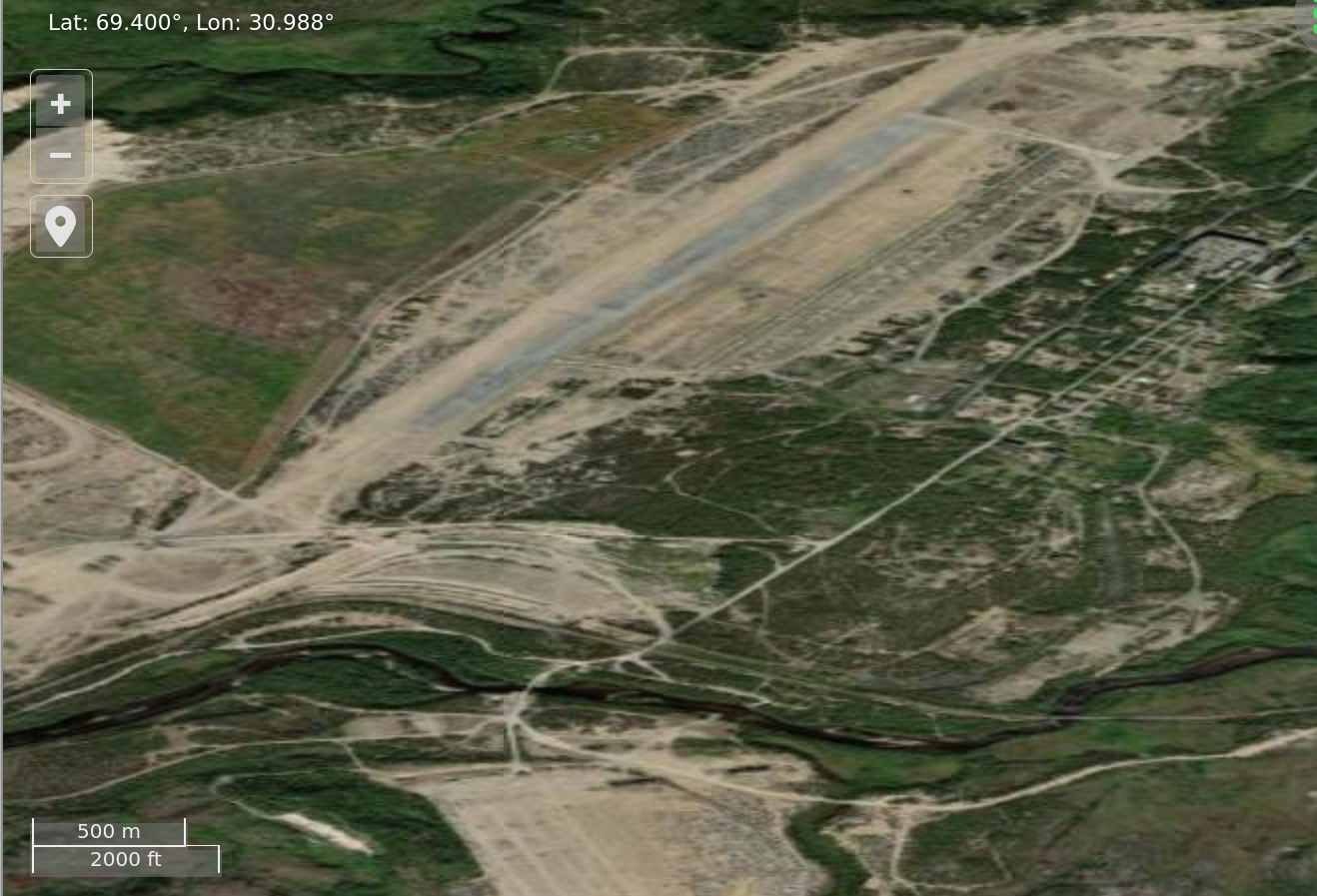
- Satellite imagery of the former Luostari airbase

Site information
- Type: Air Base
- Owner: Ministry of Defence
- Operator: Russian Ground Forces

Location
- Shown within Murmansk Oblast Luostari (Russia)
- Coordinates: 69°24′0″N 30°59′18″E

Site history
- Built: 1967
- In use: 1967 - 1994

Airfield information
- Identifiers: ICAO: XLML
- Elevation: 76 metres (249 ft) AMSL
Runways
Direction	Length and surface
02/20	1,750 metres (5,741 ft) Concrete

Luostari is a tactical airstrip and a former military air base near Korzunovo in Murmansk Oblast, northwestern Russia. The settlement was established to service the air base.

It is located just two kilometres from the former village of Ylä-Luostari, adjacent to the village developed around Petsamo (Pechenga) Monastery (the Finnish word luostari means 'monastery').

== History ==
Yuri Gagarin served here after having graduated from the 1st Chkalov Military Aviation School for Pilots in Orenburg (1957–1960). He was assigned to the 769th Fighter Aviation Regiment of the 122nd Fighter Aviation Division of the Air Forces of the Northern Fleet flying Mikoyan-Gurevich MiG-15bis aircraft.

The base was used by the 258th Independent Helicopter Squadron (258 OVE) of the 26th Army Corps of the Soviet Army flying Mil Mi-24 (ASCC: Hind), Mil Mi-35 (ASCC: Monsoon), and Mil Mi-8 (ASCC: Hip) helicopters between 1967 and 1994.

As of August 2019, it is reported as closed and planes are moved to Severomorsk-1 near Safonovo north of Murmansk.

In 2022 The Barents Observer reported that satellite images indicate that a Rezonans-NE radar station is under construction on a hill near the site.

== See also ==
- List of military airbases in Russia
