= Goryachiye Ruchyi =

Goryachiye Ruchyi Горячие Ручьи
- Inhabited locality (abolished)
- Interactive map of Goryachiye Ruchyi
- Location of Goryachiye Ruchyi Goryachiye Ruchyi (Murmansk Oblast)
- Coordinates: 69°11′N 33°29′E
- Country: Russia
- Federal subject: Murmansk Oblast
- Abolished: December 1, 2009
- Elevation: 3 m (9.8 ft)

Administrative status
  - Subordinated to: Closed Administrative-Territorial Formation of Alexandrovsk

Municipal status
  - Urban okrug: Alexandrovsk Urban Okrug
- Postal code: 184650

Goryachiye Ruchyi (Russian: Горя́чие Ручьи́) was a rural locality (an inhabited locality) in the administrative jurisdiction of the Closed Administrative-Territorial Formation of Alexandrovsk in Murmansk Oblast, Russia, located beyond the Arctic Circle at a height of 3 meters (9.8 ft) above sea level. Due to depopulation, it was abolished effective December 1, 2009.
