= Pyalitsa =

Pyalitsa Пялица
- Selo
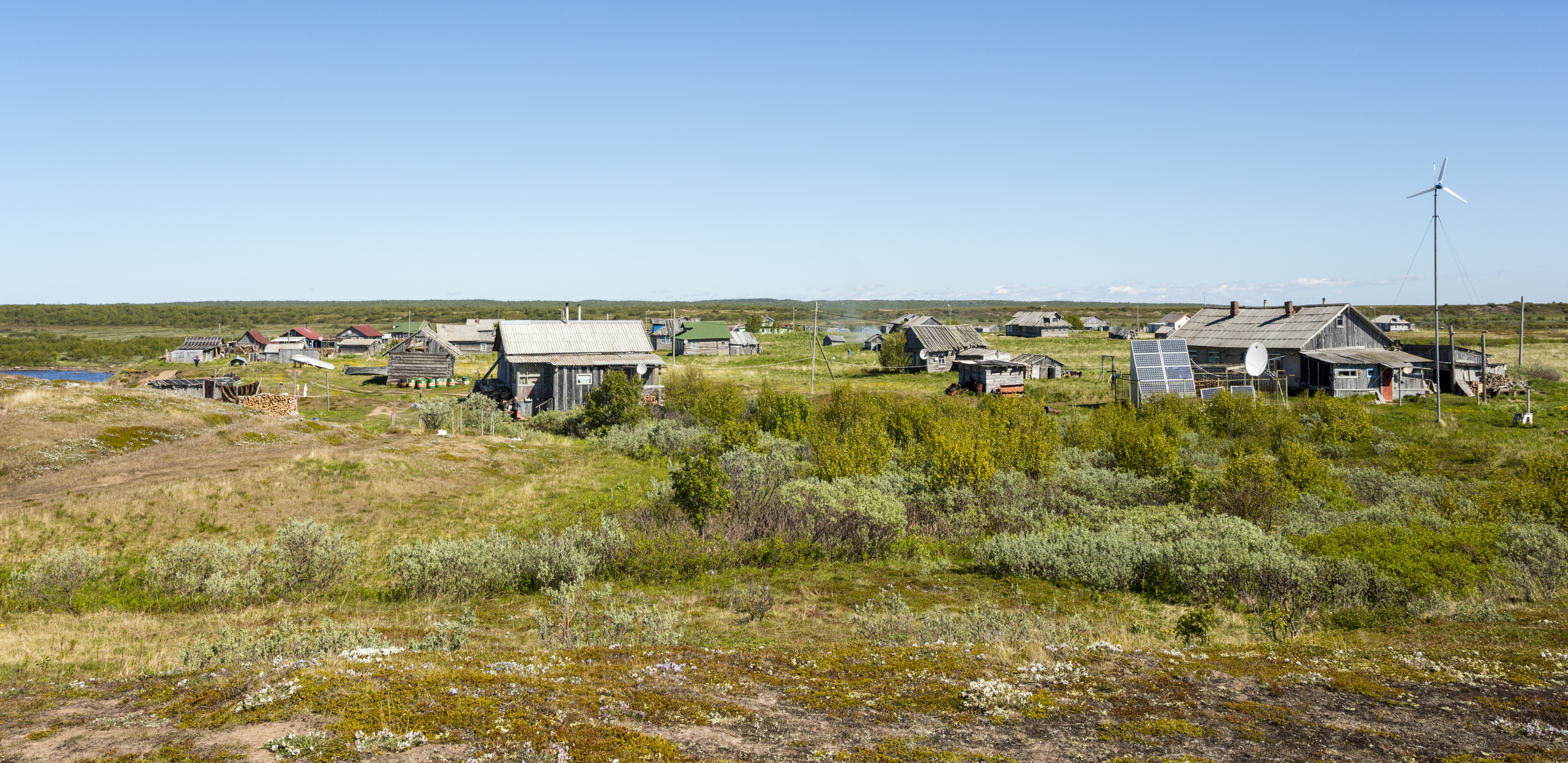
- View of Pyalitsa
- Interactive map of Pyalitsa
- Location of Pyalitsa Pyalitsa (Murmansk Oblast)
- Coordinates: 66°11′28″N 39°31′32″E
- Country: Russia
- Federal subject: Murmansk Oblast
- Administrative district: Tersky District
- Founded: 16th century

Population (2010 Census)
  - Total: 14
  - Estimate (2021): 11 (−21.4%)

Municipal status
  - Municipal district: Tersky Municipal District
  - Rural settlement: Varzuga Rural Settlement
- Time zone: UTC+3 (MSK)
- Postal code: 184716
- Dialing code: +7 81559
- OKTMO ID: 47620401131

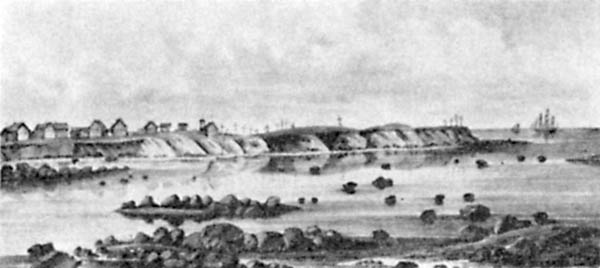
View of Pyalitsa. Reder, 1837

Pyalitsa (Russian: Пялица) is a rural locality (a selo) in Tersky District of Murmansk Oblast, Russia, located on the Kola Peninsula at a height of 1 meter (3 ft 3 in) above sea level. Population: 14 (2010 Census).
