= Slyuda, Murmansk Oblast =

Rural locality in Kovdorsky District, Murmansk Oblast, Russia

Coordinates: 67°25′59″N 30°28′36″E

Slyuda (Russian: Слюда) was a rural locality (classified as an inhabited locality) in Kovdorsky District of Murmansk Oblast, Russia, located beyond the Arctic Circle at a height of 301 meters (988 ft) above sea level. It was abolished effective November 1, 2007.
