= Pyayve =

Pyayve Пяйве
- Station
- Interactive map of Pyayve
- Location of Pyayve Pyayve (Murmansk Oblast)
- Coordinates: 68°57′56″N 32°27′47″E
- Country: Russia
- Federal subject: Murmansk Oblast
- Administrative district: Kolsky District

Population (2010 Census)
  - Total: 54
  - Estimate (2021): 21 (−61.1%)
- Time zone: UTC+3 (MSK)
- Postal code: 184380
- Dialing code: +7 81553
- OKTMO ID: 47605406111

Pyayve (Russian: Пяйве) is a rural locality (a Station) in Kolsky District of Murmansk Oblast, Russia. The village is located beyond the Arctic Circle, on the Kola Peninsula.
