= Titan, Russia =

Titan Титан
- Posyolok
- Interactive map of Titan
- Location of Titan Titan (Murmansk Oblast)
- Coordinates: 67°33′42″N 33°37′54″E
- Country: Russia
- Federal subject: Murmansk Oblast
- Administrative district: Kirovsk
- Elevation: 268 m (879 ft)

Population (2010 Census)
  - Total: 1,442
  - Estimate (2007): 1,586 (+10%)
- Time zone: UTC+3 (MSK)
- Postal code: 184245
- Dialing code: +7 81531
- OKTMO ID: 47712000111

Titan (Russian: Титан) is the rural locality (a Posyolok) in Kirovsk municipality of Murmansk Oblast, Russia. The village is located beyond the Arctic Circle, on the Kola Peninsula. Located at a height of 268 m above sea level.
