= Priozerny, Murmansk Oblast =

Priozerny Приозерный
- Inhabited locality
- Interactive map of Priozerny
- Location of Priozerny Priozerny (Murmansk Oblast)
- Coordinates: 66°58′N 30°29′E
- Country: Russia
- Federal subject: Murmansk Oblast
- Administrative district: Kandalakshsky District
- Territorial OkrugSelsoviet: Alakurttinsky Territorial Okrug

Population (2010 Census)
  - Total: 0
  - Estimate (2021): 0 )

Municipal status
  - Municipal district: Kandalakshsky Municipal District
  - Rural settlement: Alakurtti Rural Settlement
- Time zone: UTC+3 (MSK)
- Postal code: 184020
- OKTMO ID: 47608403116

Priozerny (Russian: Приозе́рный) is a rural locality (an inhabited locality) in Kandalakshsky District of Murmansk Oblast, Russia, located beyond the Arctic Circle at a height of 56 meters (184 ft) above sea level. Population: 0 (2010 Census).
