= Olenya Guba (rural locality) =

Olenya Guba Оленья Губа
- Inhabited locality
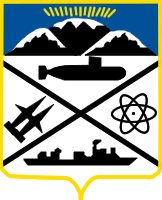
- Coat of arms
- Interactive map of Olenya Guba
- Location of Olenya Guba Olenya Guba (Murmansk Oblast)
- Coordinates: 69°13′N 33°19′E
- Country: Russia
- Federal subject: Murmansk Oblast

Population (2010 Census)
  - Total: 1,661
  - Estimate (2021): 927 (−44.2%)

Administrative status
  - Subordinated to: closed administrative-territorial formation of Alexandrovsk

Municipal status
  - Urban okrug: Alexandrovsk Urban Okrug
- Time zone: UTC+3 (MSK)
- Postal code: 184676
- OKTMO ID: 47737000111

Olenya Guba (Russian: Оле́нья Губа́) is a rural locality (an inhabited locality) in administrative jurisdiction of the closed administrative-territorial formation of Alexandrovsk in Murmansk Oblast, Russia. As of the 2010 Census, its population was 1,661.
