= Olenitsa =

Olenitsa Оленица
- Selo
- Interactive map of Olenitsa
- Location of Olenitsa Olenitsa (Murmansk Oblast)
- Coordinates: 66°28′5″N 35°20′8″E
- Country: Russia
- Federal subject: Murmansk Oblast
- Administrative district: Tersky District
- Founded: 16th century
- Elevation: 6 m (20 ft)

Population (2010 Census)
  - Total: 27
  - Estimate (2002): 50 (+85.2%)
- Time zone: UTC+3 (MSK)
- Postal code: 184710
- Dialing code: +7 81559
- OKTMO ID: 47620151116

Olenitsa (Russian: Оленица) is the rural locality (a Selo) in Tersky District of Murmansk Oblast, Russia. The village is located on the Kola Peninsula at a height of 6 m above sea level.
