= Kovdozero, Murmansk Oblast =

Kovdozero Ковдозеро
- Selo
- Interactive map of Kovdozero
- Location of Kovdozero Kovdozero (Murmansk Oblast)
- Coordinates: 66.7613°N 31.5606°E
- Country: Russia
- Federal subject: Murmansk Oblast
- Administrative district: Kandalakshsky District

Population (2010 Census)
  - Total: 121
  - Estimate (2021): 47 (−61.2%)
- Time zone: UTC+3 (MSK)
- Postal code: 184012
- Dialing code: +7 81533
- OKTMO ID: 47608407106

Kovdozero (Russian: Ковдозеро; until 1957 Konets-Kovdozero, Russian: Конец‑Ковдозеро) (Note: Karelian: Koutajärvenpiä, Järvenpiä or Kanani; Finnish: Koutajärvenpää or Kananen) is a rural locality (a Selo) in Kandalakshsky District of Murmansk Oblast, Russia. The village is located beyond the Arctic Circle, 35 meters (115 ft) above sea level. As of the 2010 census, Kovdozero had a population of 121.

== Geography ==
Kovdozero is located on the western shore of lake Kovdozero (the Knyazhegubsky Reservoir).

Municipally, Kovdozero belongs to the rural settlement of Zarechensk within the Kandalakshsky District and is located 10 kilometers (6.2 mi) north of the municipal center. The distance to the district center Kandalaksha is 102 kilometers (63 mi).

== History ==
Kovdozero has existed at least since the 19th century, at that time being a Karelian village. In 1926, the village had a population of 164, of whom 117 were Karelians, 25 were Finns and 22 were Russians.

The Kandalakshsky District, established in 1927, was initially part of the Karelian ASSR until being transferred to the Murmansk Oblast at its establishment on 28 May 1938. Konets-Kovdozero was the center of a selsoviet until being merged into the Knyazhaya Guba selsoviet on 8 December 1941, as the former's population had been evacuated due to the ongoing World War II. The Konets-Kovdozero selsoviet was restored with the reestablishment of the Kandalakshsky District on 13 March 1951.

After the Knyazhaya Guba hydroelectric station was finished in the 1950s, the area covered by the lake Kovdozero expanded to 60 square kilometers (23 sq mi) and the old village of Konets-Kovdozero was submerged. On 26 April 1956, the oblast's regional executive committee rearranged the borders of some selsoviets in the district, with Konets-Kovdozero becoming the center of the Knyazhaya Guba selsoviet and the settlement of Severny becoming that of the Konets-Kovdozero selsoviet. This decision was overturned on 10 January 1957. At the same time, the village was renamed to Kovdozero.

== Economy and services ==
As of 2009, services in Kovdozero included a post office, a library, a village hall, and a daycare center operating in a former school building. There are multiple seasonal homes (dachas) owned by people from Monchegorsk in the village.
