= Chapoma =

Chapoma Чапома
- Selo
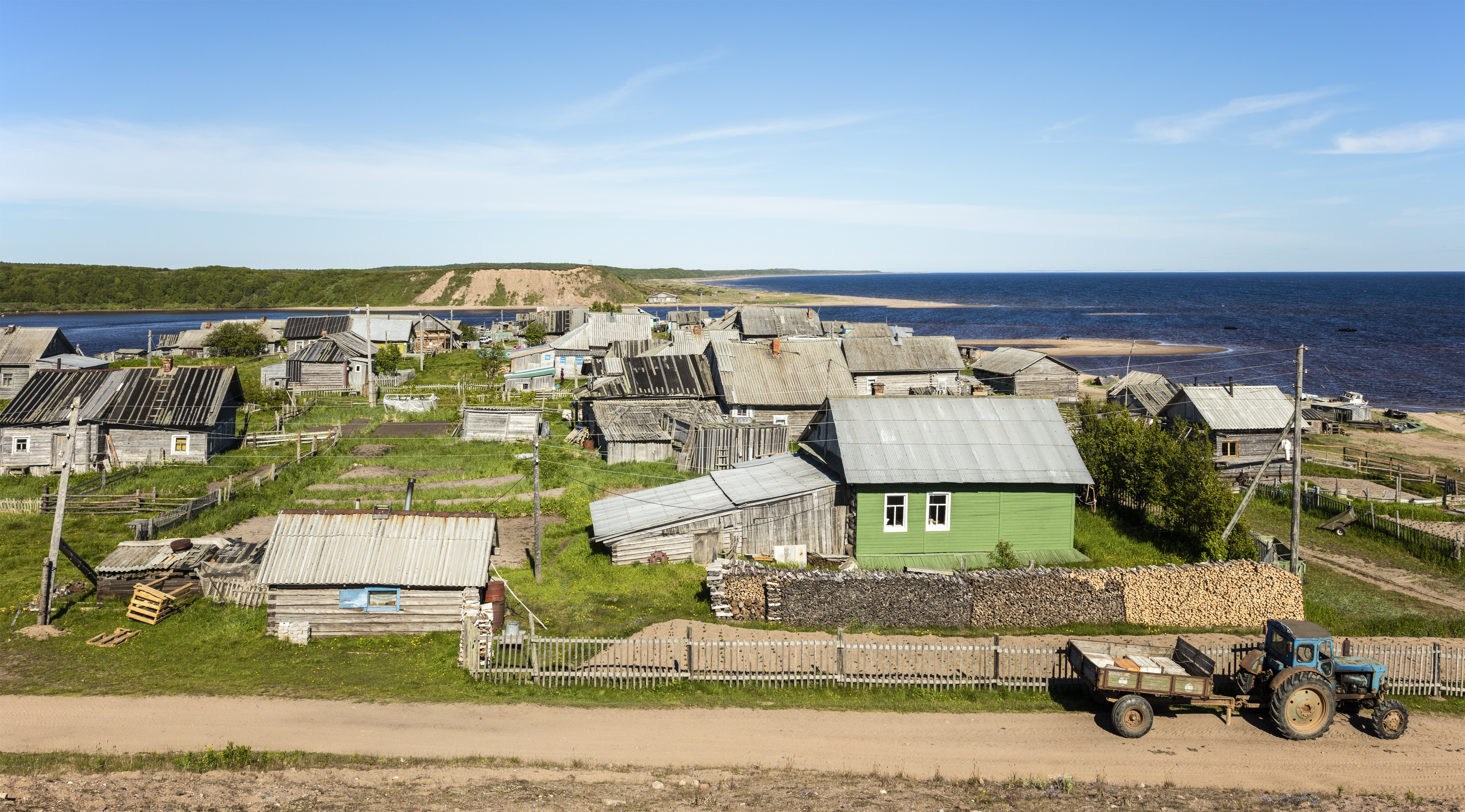
- Chapoma from the west
- Interactive map of Chapoma
- Location of Chapoma Chapoma (Murmansk Oblast)
- Coordinates: 66°6′12″N 38°51′51″E
- Country: Russia
- Federal subject: Murmansk Oblast
- Administrative district: Tersky District

Population (2010 Census)
  - Total: 81
  - Estimate (2021): 67 (−17.3%)
- Time zone: UTC+3 (MSK)
- Postal code: 184716
- Dialing code: +7 81559
- OKTMO ID: 47620401136

Chapoma (Russian: Чапома) is a rural locality (a Selo) in Tersky District of Murmansk Oblast, Russia. The village is located on the Kola Peninsula. It is 1 m above sea level.
