= Zarechensk =

Zarechensk Зареченск
- Inhabited locality
- Interactive map of Zarechensk
- Location of Zarechensk Zarechensk (Murmansk Oblast)
- Coordinates: 66°41′N 31°26′E
- Country: Russia
- Federal subject: Murmansk Oblast
- Administrative district: Kandalakshsky District
- Territorial okrugSelsoviet: Zarechensky Territorial Okrug

Population (2010 Census)
  - Total: 621
  - Estimate (2021): 363 (−41.5%)

Municipal status
  - Municipal district: Kandalakshsky Municipal District
  - Urban settlement: Zarechensk Rural Settlement
  - Capital of: Zarechensk Rural Settlement
- Time zone: UTC+3 (MSK)
- Postal code: 184004
- Dialing code: +7 81533
- OKTMO ID: 47608407101

Zarechensk (Russian: Заре́ченск) is a rural locality (an inhabited locality) in Kandalakshsky District of Murmansk Oblast, Russia, located beyond the Arctic Circle at a height of 124 meters (407 ft) above sea level. As of the 2010 census, it had a population of 621.

Zarechensk is located on the eastern shore of the river Iova (an upper section of the Kovda), 120 kilometers (75 mi) away from the district center Kandalaksha. The settlement was founded in 1956 around the Iova hydroelectric station and was initially named Posyolok Iovskoy GES after it. On 6 September 1957, it was renamed to Zarechensk and granted the status of a work settlement.

Zarechensk is the municipal center of the Zarechensk Rural Settlement, which also includes the village of Kovdozero and the railway station settlement of Nyamozero. Abolished settlements within the municipality include Kichany, Mosha, Notozersky, Severny and Tolvand, some of which still have seasonal inhabitants.

As of 2009, the only industrial enterprise in Zarechensk was the Iova hydroelectric station, owned by TGC-1. Forestry was also a significant industry until the 1980s.
