= Kashkarantsy =

Kashkarantsy Кашкаранцы
- Selo
- Interactive map of Kashkarantsy
- Location of Kashkarantsy Kashkarantsy (Murmansk Oblast)
- Coordinates: 66°20′21″N 36°3′39″E
- Country: Russia
- Federal subject: Murmansk Oblast
- Administrative district: Tersky District
- Elevation: 7 m (23 ft)

Population (2010 Census)
  - Total: 79
  - Estimate (2021): 28 (−64.6%)
- Time zone: UTC+3 (MSK)
- Postal code: 184711
- Dialing code: +7 81559
- OKTMO ID: 47620401116

Kashkarantsy (Russian: Кашкаранцы) is a rural locality (a Selo) in Tersky District of Murmansk Oblast, Russia. The village is located on the Kola Peninsula. It is 7 m above sea level.
