= Mokket =

Mokket Моккет
- Station
- Interactive map of Mokket
- Location of Mokket Mokket (Murmansk Oblast)
- Coordinates: 69°12′0″N 31°40′0″E
- Country: Russia
- Federal subject: Murmansk Oblast
- Administrative district: Kolsky District
- Postal code: 184380
- Dialing code: +7 81553

Mokket (Russian: Моккет) is a rural locality (a Station) in Kolsky District of Murmansk Oblast, Russia. The village is located beyond the Arctic Circle at a height of 175 m above sea level.

It was founded at 1957. Train station at 96 km of Kola - Pechenga Railway.

Population: 4 (50 % of russians, 2002 Census).

Due to depopulation, it was abolished effective October 26, 2007.

== Sources ==
- Моккет // Кольская энциклопедия. В 5 т. Т. 3. Л — О / Гл. ред. В. П. Петров. — Мурманск : РУСМА (ИП Глухов А. Б.), 2013. — С. 232.
- Моккет // Географический словарь Мурманской области / авт.-сост. В. Г. Мужиков. — Мурманск : Мурман. обл. ин-т развития регион. образования, повышения квалификации пед. кадров, 1996. — С. 92. — ISBN 5-86975-023-7.
- МОККЕТ // «Кольский Север». Энциклопедический лексикон / Гл. ред. А. С. Лоханов. — Мурманск : Доброхот, 2013.
- Моккет // Кольская энциклопедия. 2005-2026.
