= Terki =

Terki may refer to:

- Terki (fortress), in 16-17th centuries a Russian fortress on the Terek river
- Terki (Iran), an uncommon romanization of Tereki in Iran
