= Tersky (rural locality) =

Tersky (Russian: Терский; masculine), Terskaya (Терская; feminine), or Terskoye (Терское; neuter) is the name of several rural localities in Russia:

- Tersky, Budyonnovsky District, Stavropol Krai, a settlement in Tersky Selsoviet of Budyonnovsky District of Stavropol Krai
- Tersky, Georgiyevsky District, Stavropol Krai, a settlement in Alexandriysky Selsoviet of Georgiyevsky District of Stavropol Krai
- Terskoye, Krasnoyarsk Krai, a village in Tersky Selsoviet of Kansky District of Krasnoyarsk Krai
- Terskoye, Tambov Oblast, a selo in Tersky Selsoviet of Michurinsky District of Tambov Oblast
- Terskaya, a stanitsa in Terskoye Rural Settlement of Mozdoksky District of the Republic of North Ossetia–Alania
