= 27 km Zheleznoy Dorogi Monchegorsk–Olenya =

27 km Zheleznoy Dorogi Monchegorsk–Olenya 27 км Железной Дороги Мончегорск–Оленья
- Inhabited locality
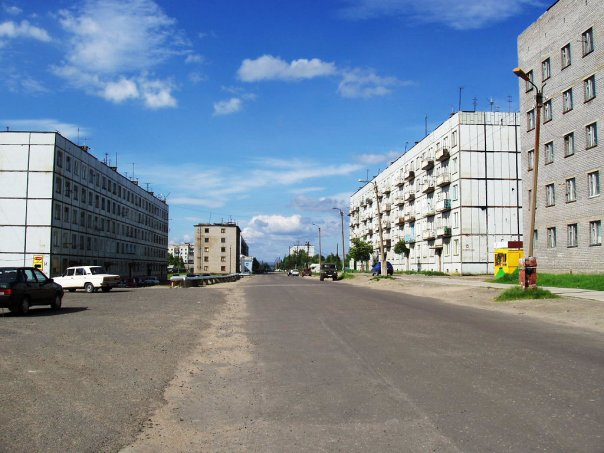
- Oktyabrskaya Street
- Interactive map of 27 km Zheleznoy Dorogi Monchegorsk–Olenya
- Location of 27 km Zheleznoy Dorogi Monchegorsk–Olenya 27 km Zheleznoy Dorogi Monchegorsk–Olenya (Murmansk Oblast)
- Coordinates: 67°58′19″N 32°57′22″E
- Country: Russia
- Federal subject: Murmansk Oblast
- Elevation: 128 m (420 ft)

Population (2010 Census)
  - Total: 2,359
  - Estimate (2021): 2,036 (−13.7%)

Administrative status
  - Subordinated to: Monchegorsk Town with Jurisdictional Territory

Municipal status
  - Urban okrug: Monchegorsk Urban Okrug
- Time zone: UTC+3 (MSK)
- Postal code: 184512
- Dialing code: +7 81536
- OKTMO ID: 47715000116

27 km Zheleznoy Dorogi Monchegorsk–Olenya (Russian: 27 км Железной Дороги Мончегорск–Оленья) is a rural locality (an inhabited locality) in jurisdiction of Monchegorsk Town with Jurisdictional Territory in Murmansk Oblast, Russia, located beyond the Arctic Circle on the Kola Peninsula at a height of 128 meters (420 ft) above sea level. Population: 2,359 (2010 Census).
