= Nyamozero =

Nyamozero Нямозеро
- Station
- Interactive map of Nyamozero
- Location of Nyamozero Nyamozero (Murmansk Oblast)
- Coordinates: 66°58′0″N 31°28′0″E
- Country: Russia
- Federal subject: Murmansk Oblast
- Administrative district: Kandalakshskiy District

Population (2010 Census)
  - Total: 8
  - Estimate (2021): 3 (−62.5%)
- Time zone: UTC+3 (MSK)
- Postal code: 184004
- Dialing code: +7 81533
- OKTMO ID: 47608407111

Nyamozero (Russian: Нямозеро) is a rural locality (a Station) in Kandalakshskiy District of Murmansk Oblast, Russia. The village is located beyond the Arctic Circle. It is 174 m above sea level.
