= Kovdor =

Town in Murmansk Oblast, Russia

Kovdor Ковдор
- Town
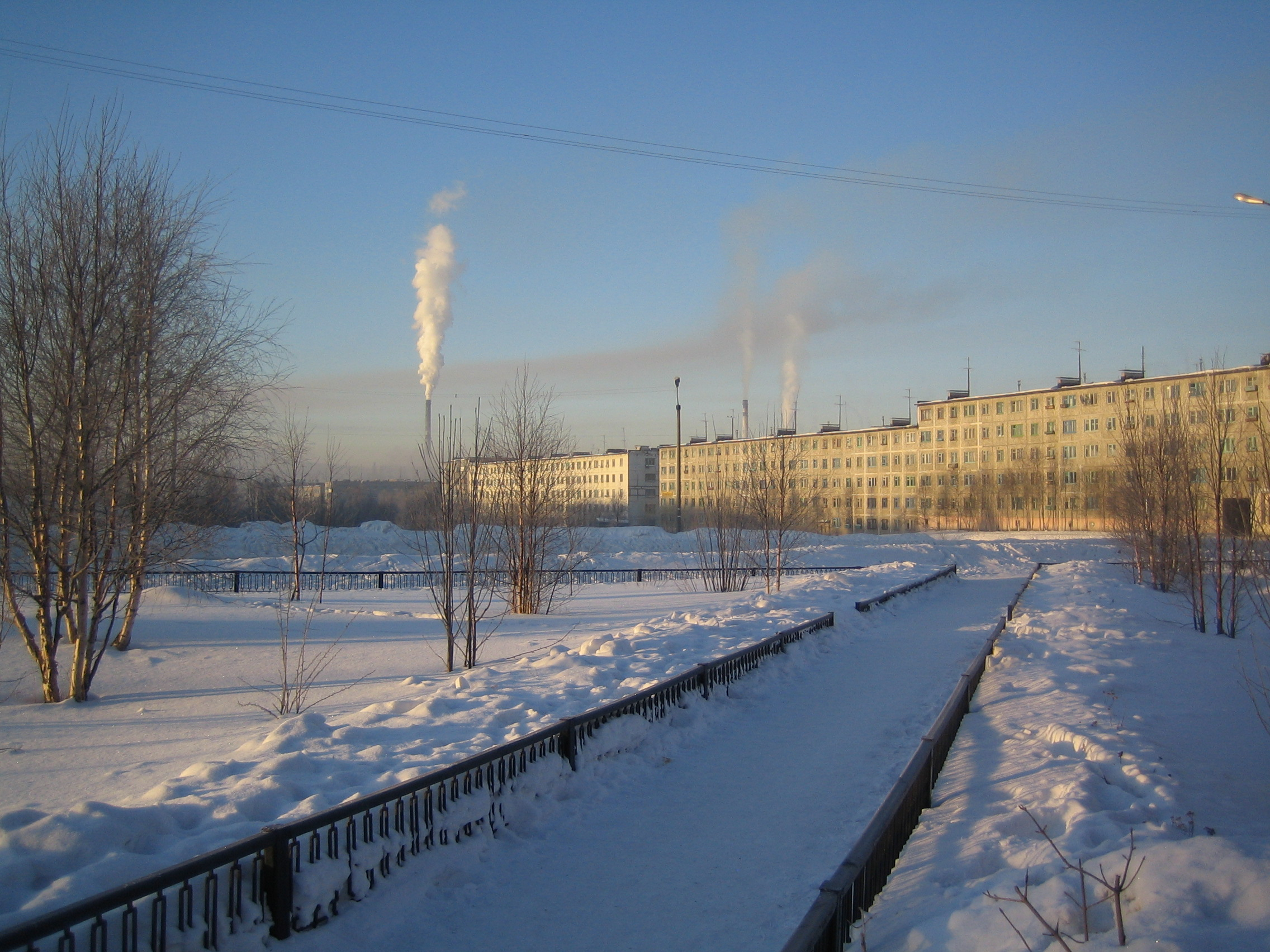
- View of Kоvdor

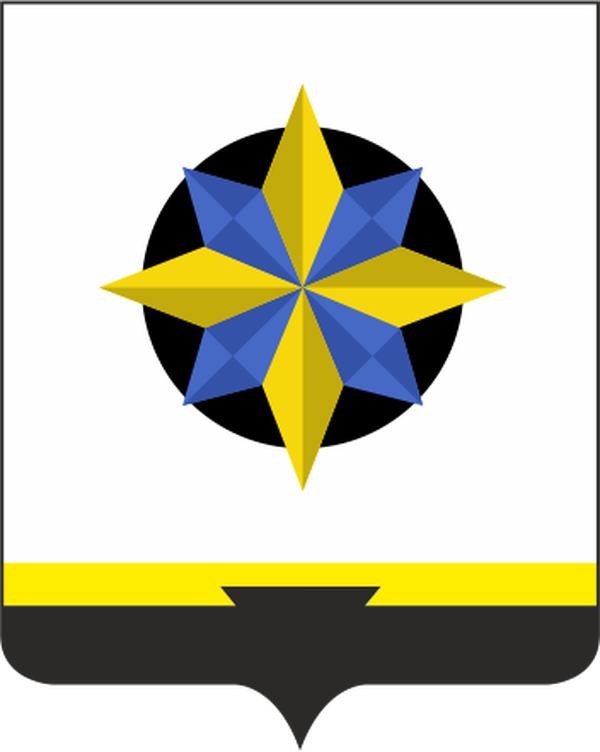
- Flag Coat of arms
- Interactive map of Kovdor
- Location of Kovdor Kovdor (Murmansk Oblast)
- Coordinates: 67°33′34″N 30°28′00″E
- Country: Russia
- Federal subject: Murmansk Oblast
- Administrative district: Kovdorsky District
- Founded: 1953
- Town status since: September 20, 1965
- Elevation: 209 m (686 ft)

Population (2010 Census)
  - Total: 18,820
  - Estimate (2023): 15,423 (−18%)

Administrative status
  - Capital of: Kovdorsky District

Municipal status
  - Urban okrug: Kovdorsky Urban Okrug
- Time zone: UTC+3 (MSK)
- Postal code: 184000
- Dialing code: +7 81535
- OKTMO ID: 47703000001
- Website: kovadm.ru

Kovdor (Russian: Ковдор, Finnish: Koutero) is a town and the administrative center of Kovdorsky District of Murmansk Oblast, Russia, mostly known for its mining industry. Population: 18,820 (2010 census); 20,867 (2002 census); 30,478 (1989 Soviet census).

== History ==
By 1965, Kovdor was a work settlement in the district of Kirovsk. By the September 20, 1965 Presidium of the Supreme Soviet of the Russian SFSR Decree, it was granted the status of a town under district jurisdiction and subordinated to Kirovsk Town Soviet. However, by the June 28, 1967 Presidium of the Supreme Soviet of the RSFSR Decree, Kovdor was subordinated to Apatity—a town under oblast jurisdiction which was granted this status a year before.

== Economy ==
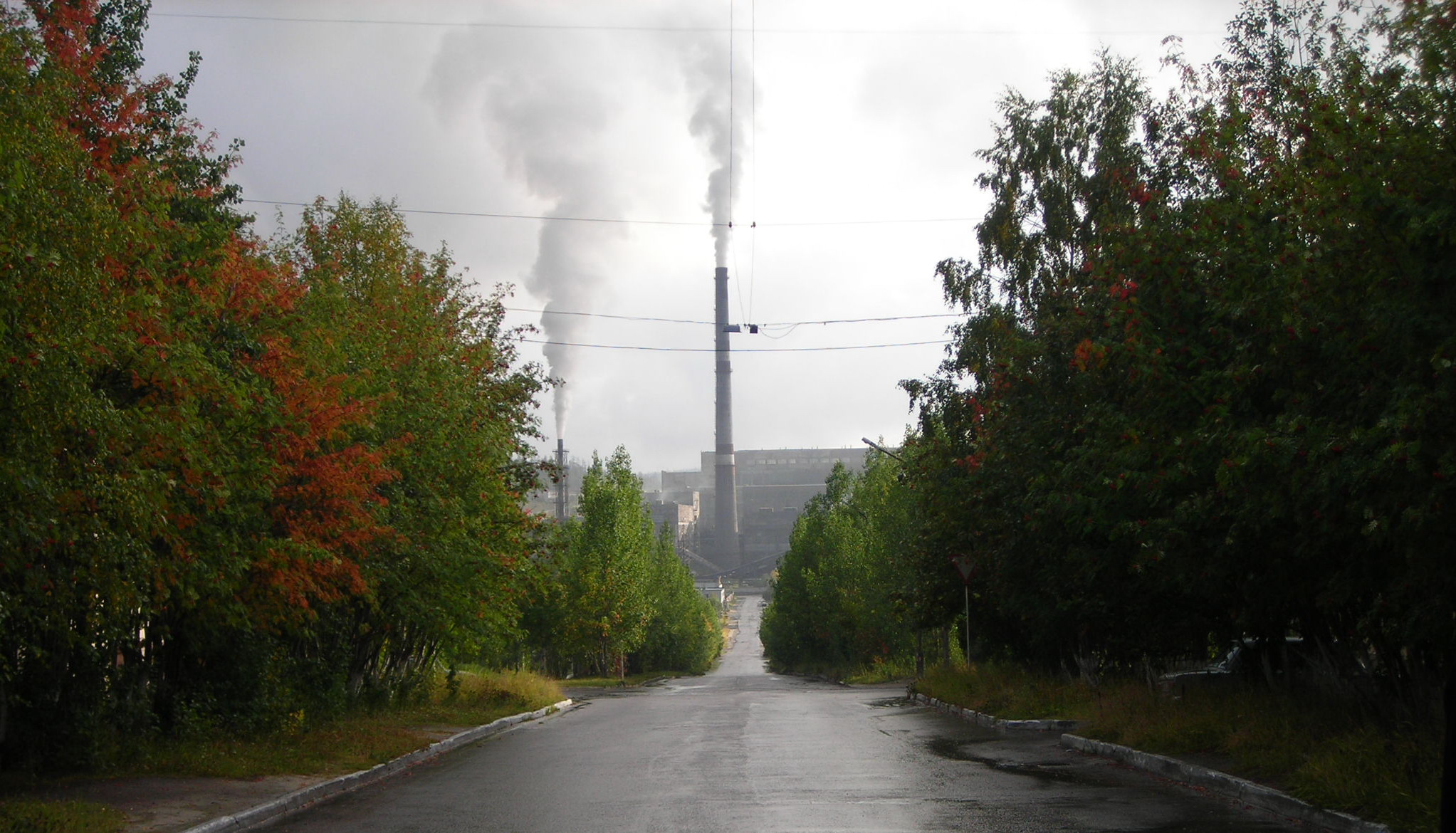
Lenina Street. A view to the chimney of Kovdorsky GOK

Kovdor is located in the center of a large mineral resources field. The town's industry is mostly tied to mining. A carbonatite mine is located near the town. Public limited company "Kovdor's Mining Plant" (Kovdorsky gorno-obogatitelny kombinat, or Kovdorsky GOK) is the largest company in the town and in Kovdorsky District. Kovdorsky GOK is a part of Russia's largest mineral fertilizer producer EuroChem.

The area around Kovdor is rich in mica, iron ore, and vermiculite. The town is named after Kovdoro lake.

== International relations ==
=== Twin towns and sister cities ===
Kovdor is twinned with:

- Haparanda, Sweden
- Salla, Finland
