= Luostari (railway station) =

Luostari Луостари
- Inhabited locality
- Interactive map of Luostari
- Location of Luostari Luostari (Murmansk Oblast)
- Coordinates: 69°24′01″N 31°06′35″E
- Country: Russia
- Federal subject: Murmansk Oblast
- Administrative district: Pechengsky District
- Territorial okrugSelsoviet: Korzunovsky Territorial Okrug
- Founded: 1953
- Elevation: 62 m (203 ft)

Population (2010 Census)
  - Total: 10
  - Estimate (2021): 8 (−20%)

Municipal status
  - Municipal district: Pechengsky Municipal District
  - Rural settlement: Korzunovo Rural Settlement
- Time zone: UTC+3 (MSK)
- Postal code: 184413
- Dialing code: +7 81554
- OKTMO ID: 47615406116

Luostari (Russian: Луостари) is a rural locality (classified as a railway station) in Pechengsky District of Murmansk Oblast, Russia, located beyond the Arctic Circle at a height of 62 meters (203 ft) above sea level. Population: 10 (2010 Census).
