= Kildinstroy =

Kildinstroy Кильдинстрой
- Urban-type settlement
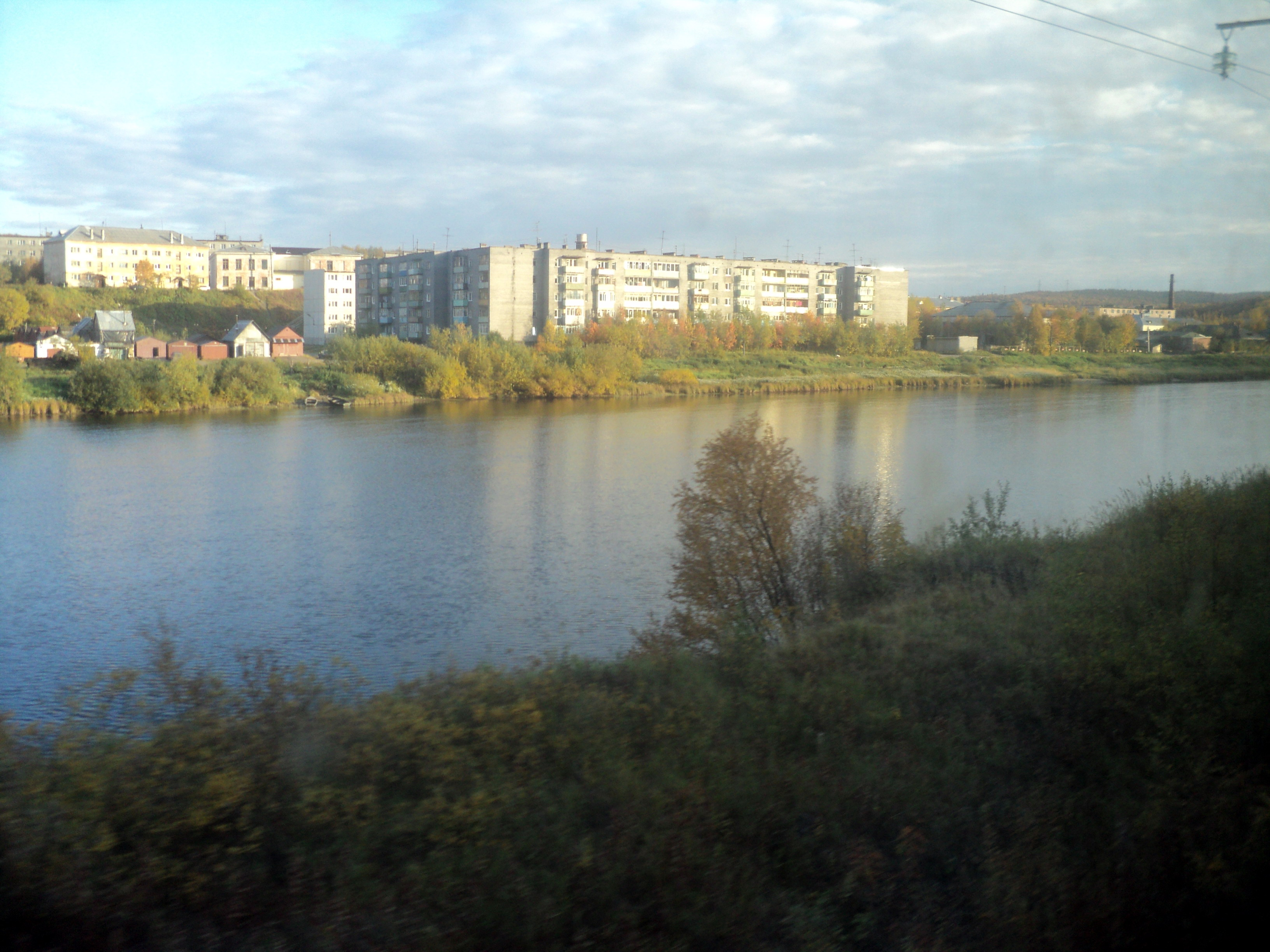
- Kola in Kildinstroy
- Interactive map of Kildinstroy
- Location of Kildinstroy Kildinstroy (Murmansk Oblast)
- Coordinates: 68°47′N 33°06′E
- Country: Russia
- Federal subject: Murmansk Oblast
- Administrative district: Kolsky District
- Founded: 1936
- Elevation: 27 m (89 ft)

Population (2010 Census)
  - Total: 2,063
  - Estimate (2025): 2,136 (+3.5%)

Municipal status
  - Municipal district: Kolsky Municipal District
  - Urban settlement: Kildinstroy Urban Settlement
- Time zone: UTC+3 (MSK)
- Postal code: 184367
- Dialing code: +7 81553
- OKTMO ID: 47605158051

Kildinstroy (Russian: Кильдинстрой) is an urban locality (an urban-type settlement) in Kolsky District of Murmansk Oblast, Russia, located on the Kola Peninsula on the lower Kola River, 9 kilometers (5.6 mi) south of Murmansk. Population: 2,063 (2010 census); 2,861 (2002 Census); 3,731 (1989 Census).

It was founded around 1935. By the All-Russian Central Executive Committee (VTsIK) Resolution of October 1937, it was granted the work settlement status.
