= Luostari (inhabited locality) =

Luostari Луостари Luostari (Finnish)
- Inhabited locality
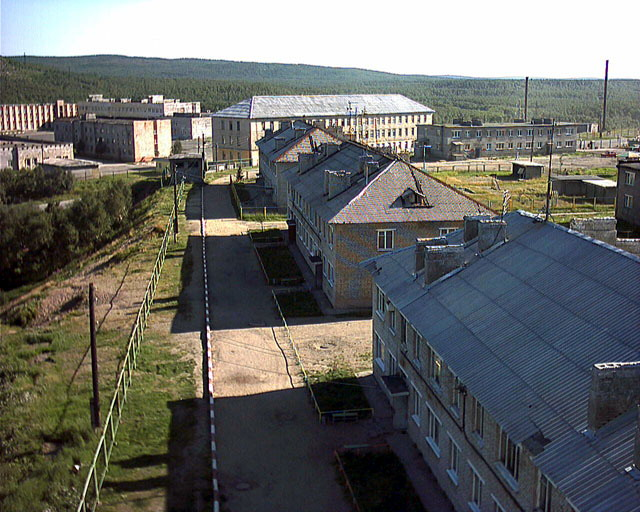
- View of Luostari
- Interactive map of Luostari
- Location of Luostari Luostari (Murmansk Oblast)
- Coordinates: 69°25′15″N 31°02′48″E
- Country: Russia
- Federal subject: Murmansk Oblast
- Administrative district: Pechengsky District
- Territorial okrugSelsoviet: Korzunovsky Territorial Okrug
- Elevation: 62 m (203 ft)

Population (2010 Census)
  - Total: 2,260
  - Estimate (2021): 1,687 (−25.4%)

Municipal status
  - Municipal district: Pechengsky Municipal District
  - Rural settlement: Korzunovo Rural Settlement
- Time zone: UTC+3 (MSK)
- Postal code: 184413
- Dialing code: +7 81544
- OKTMO ID: 47615406106

Luostari (Russian: Луостари, Finnish: Ylä-Luostari between 1920 and 1944) is a rural locality (an inhabited locality) in Pechengsky District of Murmansk Oblast, Russia, located near the Norway–Russia border. Population: 2,260 (2010 Census).

== History ==
According to the Tartu Peace Treaty in 1920, Soviet Russia recognized Petsamo (now Pechenga) and Luostari as part of Finland. The locality was known as Ylä-Luostari ('Upper Monastery') to differ it from Ala-Luostari ("Lower Monastery", by the Pechenga Bay, nowadays part of Pechenga) and it had 47 residents. There was also a youth hostel called Lohilinna, which was owned by Suomen Matkailijayhdistys (Finnish Tourist Association) since 1935. Lohilinna was destroyed during the Winter War. During Interim Peace Finnish National Air Carrier Aero operated the route Helsinki-Petsamo through the airfield of Ylä-Luostari, which had been completed just before Winter War in November 1939. In 1942, during the Continuation War (1941–1944), Finland gave the airfield for the use of German Luftwaffe. According the Moscow Armistice, Finland lost Petsamo in 1944. Soviets renamed the Finnish airfield to Luostari air base.
