= Tersky District =

Location of the Kabardino-Balkarian Republic in Russia

Location of Murmansk Oblast in Russia

Tersky District is the name of several administrative and municipal districts in Russia:

- Tersky District, Kabardino-Balkarian Republic, an administrative and municipal district of the Kabardino-Balkarian Republic
- Tersky District, Murmansk Oblast, an administrative and municipal district of Murmansk Oblast

== See also ==
- Tersky (disambiguation)
