= Vidyayevo =

Vidyayevo Видяево
- Inhabited locality
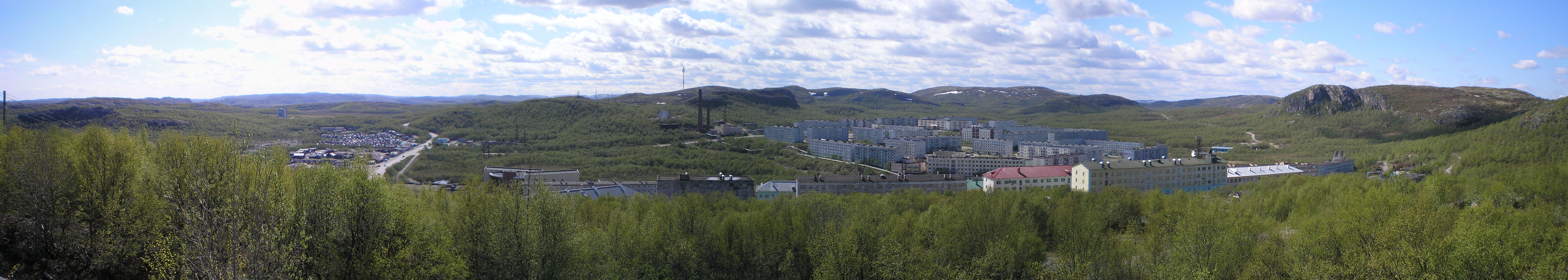
- Panorama of Vidyayevo

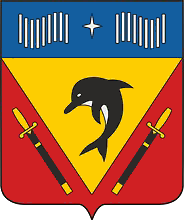
- Flag Coat of arms
- Interactive map of Vidyayevo
- Location of Vidyayevo Vidyayevo (Murmansk Oblast)
- Coordinates: 69°19′N 32°48′E
- Country: Russia
- Federal subject: Murmansk Oblast
- Founded: 1958

Government
  - Mayor: S. Dubovoy
- Elevation: 5 m (16 ft)

Population (2010 Census)
  - Total: 5,771
  - Estimate (2025): 4,186 (−27.5%)

Administrative status
  - Subordinated to: closed administrative-territorial formation of Vidyayevo
  - Capital of: closed administrative-territorial formation of Vidyayevo

Municipal status
  - Urban okrug: Vidyayevo Urban Okrug
  - Capital of: Vidyayevo Urban Okrug
- Time zone: UTC+3 (MSK)
- Postal code: 184372
- Dialing code: +7 81553
- OKTMO ID: 47735000101
- Website: www.zatovid.ru

Map of the Northern Fleet bases

Vidyayevo (Russian: Видя́ево) is a closed rural inhabited locality in Murmansk Oblast, Russia. Despite having a rural status, it is municipally incorporated as Vidyayevo Urban Okrug, as such status is the only one allowed by the federal law for closed inhabited localities. Population: 5,771 (2010 census); 6,307 (2002 Census).

It is mostly known for the naval bases located in the Ara and Ura Bays. The locality itself is situated on the eastern side of the Ura Bay. One of the principal bases of the Northern Fleet of the Russian Navy is located here.

== History ==
It was founded in 1958 as Uritsa (Урица), after the river flowing from Pityevoye Lake into the bay and providing drinking water for the settlement. Most likely, the name Uritsa is a Russian diminutive of Ura, which is a native Saami (Lappi) name for the bay and for a larger river Ura also feeding into the Ura Bay several kilometers away from Vidyayevo. Uritsa was renamed Vidyayevo in 1964 in honor of the World War II submarine commander Fyodor Vidyayev who perished in the Barents Sea in course of the military mission of the submarine ShcH-422 under his command.

=== Naval base ===
In the early 1960s, the area started serving as a base for diesel-powered submarines, and in 1979 nuclear-powered ones as well. In the 1980s, the base at Ara Bay was a relatively large one, serving submarines of all three generations. Remaining submarines in service in Ara Bay today are of the Akula (Shchuka-B), Sierra, and Oscar-II (Antey) class.

Vidyayevo (particularly the Ara Bay) was the home base of the now lost K-141 Kursk (which was an Oscar-II class). Naval radioactive waste storage facilities are located at the Ara Bay as well.

The base at Ura Bay is used for diesel submarines and a few smaller surface vessels. The settlement consists mostly of five-story apartment buildings built on granite rock foundations or on poles driven into permafrost.

== Administrative and municipal status ==
Within the framework of administrative divisions, it is, together with another rural locality, incorporated as the closed administrative-territorial formation of Vidyayevo—an administrative unit with the status equal to that of the districts. As a municipal division, the closed administrative-territorial formation of Vidyayevo is incorporated as Vidyayevo Urban Okrug.
