= Korzunovo =

Korzunovo Корзуново
- Inhabited locality
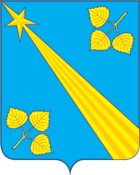
- Coat of arms
- Interactive map of Korzunovo
- Location of Korzunovo Korzunovo (Murmansk Oblast)
- Coordinates: 69°23′59″N 31°00′34″E
- Country: Russia
- Federal subject: Murmansk Oblast
- Administrative district: Pechengsky District
- Territorial okrugSelsoviet: Korzunovsky Territorial Okrug
- Founded: 1947
- Elevation: 63 m (207 ft)

Population (2010 Census)
  - Total: 275
  - Estimate (2021): 243 (−11.6%)

Municipal status
  - Municipal district: Pechengsky Municipal District
  - Rural settlement: Korzunovo Rural Settlement
- Time zone: UTC+3 (MSK)
- Postal code: 184405
- Dialing code: +7 81554
- OKTMO ID: 47615406101

Korzunovo (Russian: Корзуново) is a rural locality (an inhabited locality) in Pechengsky District of Murmansk Oblast, Russia, located beyond the Arctic Circle at a height of 63 meters (207 ft) above sea level. Population: 275 (2010 Census).
