= Alexandrovsk, Murmansk Oblast =

Closed city in Murmansk Oblast, Russia

Coordinates: 69.2500°N 33.3167°E

Location of Alexandrovsk in Murmansk Oblast

Alexandrovsk (Russian: Алекса́ндровск) is a closed administrative-territorial formation in Murmansk Oblast, Russia. Its administrative center is the town of Polyarny. Population: 42,789 (2010 census).

== History ==
It was formed on May 28, 2008, when Russian President Dmitry Medvedev signed a presidential decree merging the closed-administrative formations of Polyarny, Skalisty, and Snezhnogorsk into one in order to improve efficiency.

== Administrative and municipal status ==
Within the framework of administrative divisions, its status is equal to that of the districts. As a municipal division, it is incorporated as Alexandrovsk Urban Okrug.

Apart from the three towns, the formation includes five rural localities.
