= Kovdorsky District =

Kovdorsky District Ковдорский район (Russian)
- District
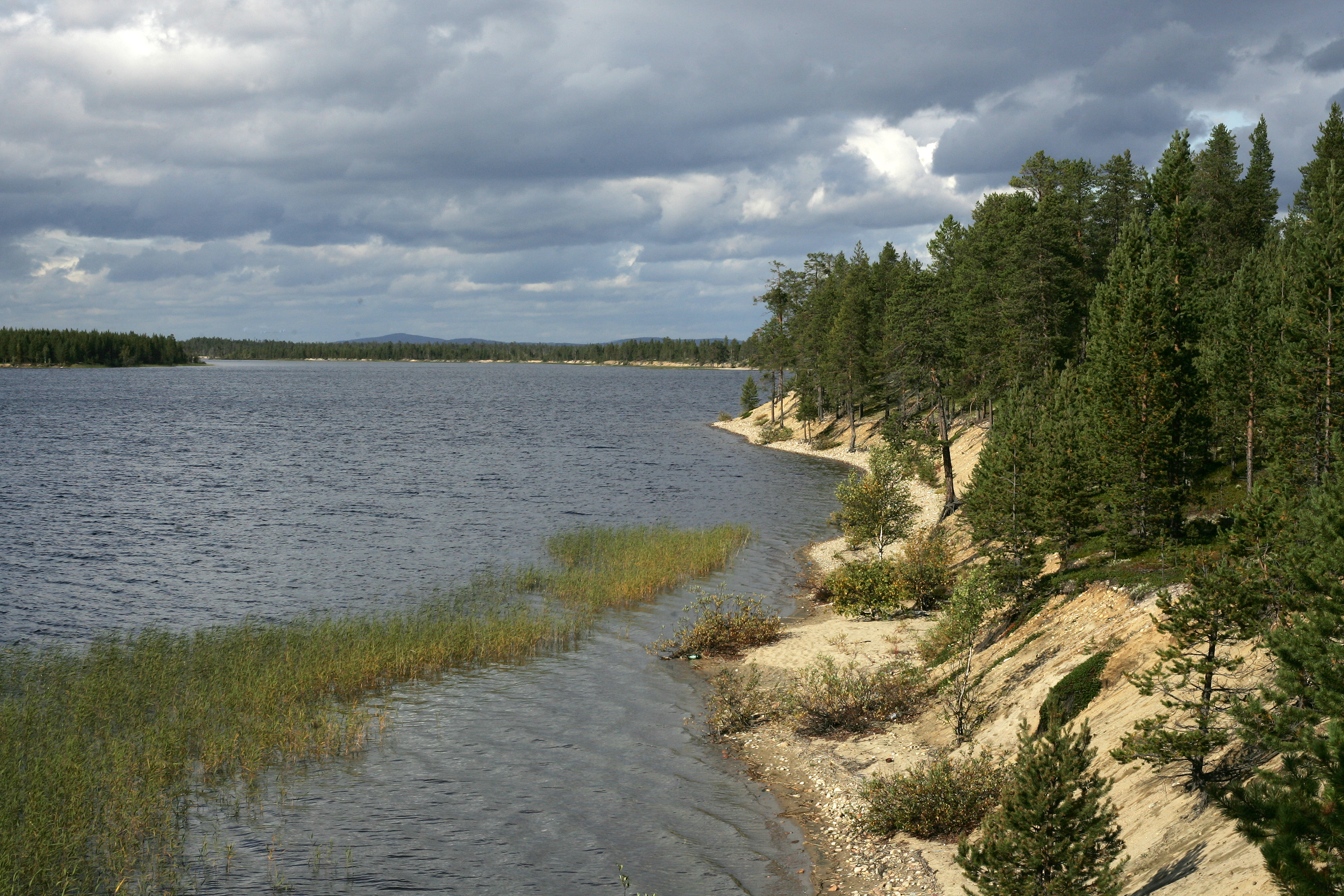
- Pirengensky Reserve, Kovdorsky District

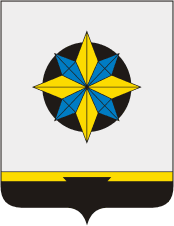
- Flag Coat of arms
- Location of Kovdorsky District in Murmansk Oblast
- Coordinates: 67°34′N 30°28′E
- Country: Russia
- Federal subject: Murmansk Oblast
- Established: November 29, 1979
- Administrative center: Kovdor

Government
  - Type: Local government
  - Body: Council of Deputies
  - Head: Nikolay Karelsky

Area
  - Total: 4,066 km^{2} (1,570 sq mi)

Population (2010 Census)
  - Total: 21,297
  - Density: 5.238/km^{2} (13.57/sq mi)
  - Urban: 88.4%
  - Rural: 11.6%

Administrative structure
  - Administrative divisions: 1 Towns, 1 Territorial okrugs
  - Inhabited localities: 1 cities/towns, 5 rural localities

Municipal structure
  - Municipally incorporated as: Kovdorsky Urban Okrug
- Time zone: UTC+3 (MSK)
- OKTMO ID: 47703000
- Website: http://kovadm.ru

Kovdorsky District (Russian: Ковдо́рский райо́н) is an administrative district (raion), one of the six in Murmansk Oblast, Russia. It is located to the west of the Kola Peninsula. The area of the district is 4,066 square kilometers (1,570 sq mi). Its administrative center is the town of Kovdor. Population: 21,297 (2010 census); 24,404 (2002 census); 36,786 (1989 Soviet census). The population of Kovdor accounts for 88.4% of the district's total population.

== History ==
The district was formed by the November 29, 1979 Decree by the Presidium of the Supreme Soviet of the Russian SFSR from parts of the territory subordinated to the town of Apatity.

== Municipal status ==
As a municipal division, the territory of the district is incorporated as Kovdorsky Urban Okrug (Ковдо́рский городско́й о́круг).

== Economy ==
The majority industries in the area are metallurgy and building materials. Mining is also a very important industry, and it was one of the earliest industries in the region. Minerals mined in the district include mica, iron, and vermiculite. Commercial production of mica in the district began in 1934.

== Demographics ==
As of 2010, the district's population is 21,297. The population is declining due to emigration and natural decrease.

== Politics ==
The local representative body is the Council of Deputies of Kovdorsky District. It has eighteen members elected for a term of five years. The Head of the District is the highest executive post and is elected by popular vote for a five-year term.

== Notable residents ==
- Anna Cholovyaga (born 1992), footballer
