= Tersky District, Murmansk Oblast =

Tersky District Терский район (Russian)
- District
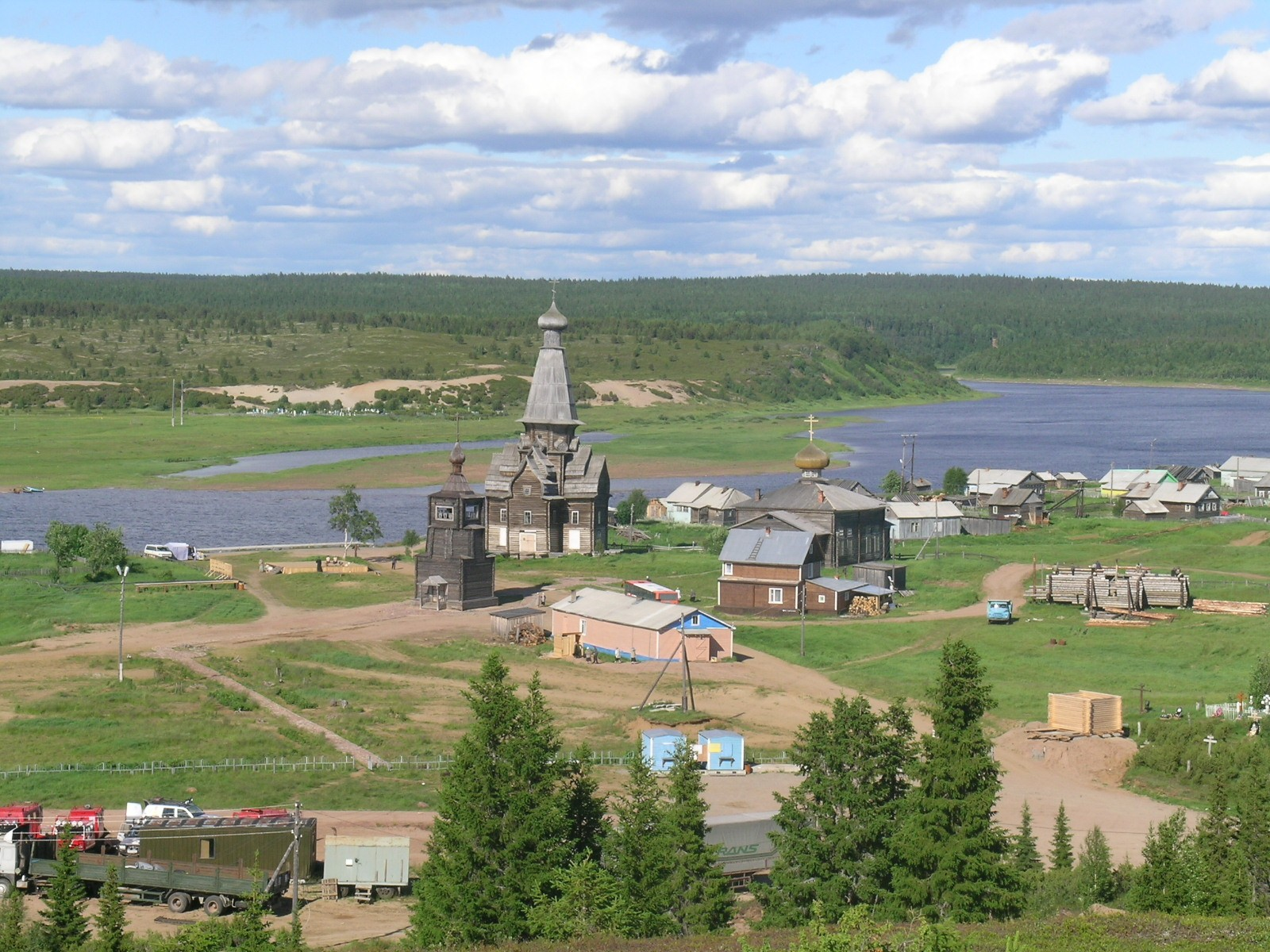
- Village (selo) Varzuga, Tersky District

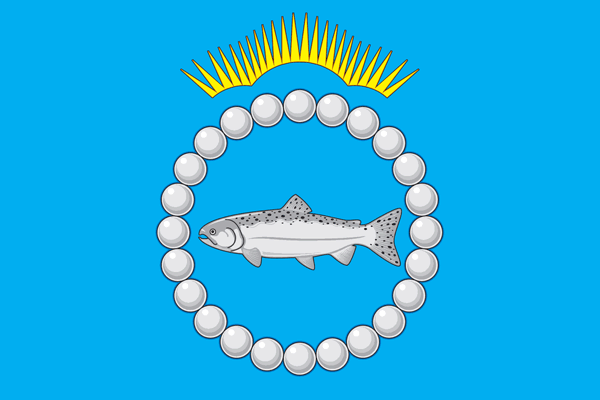
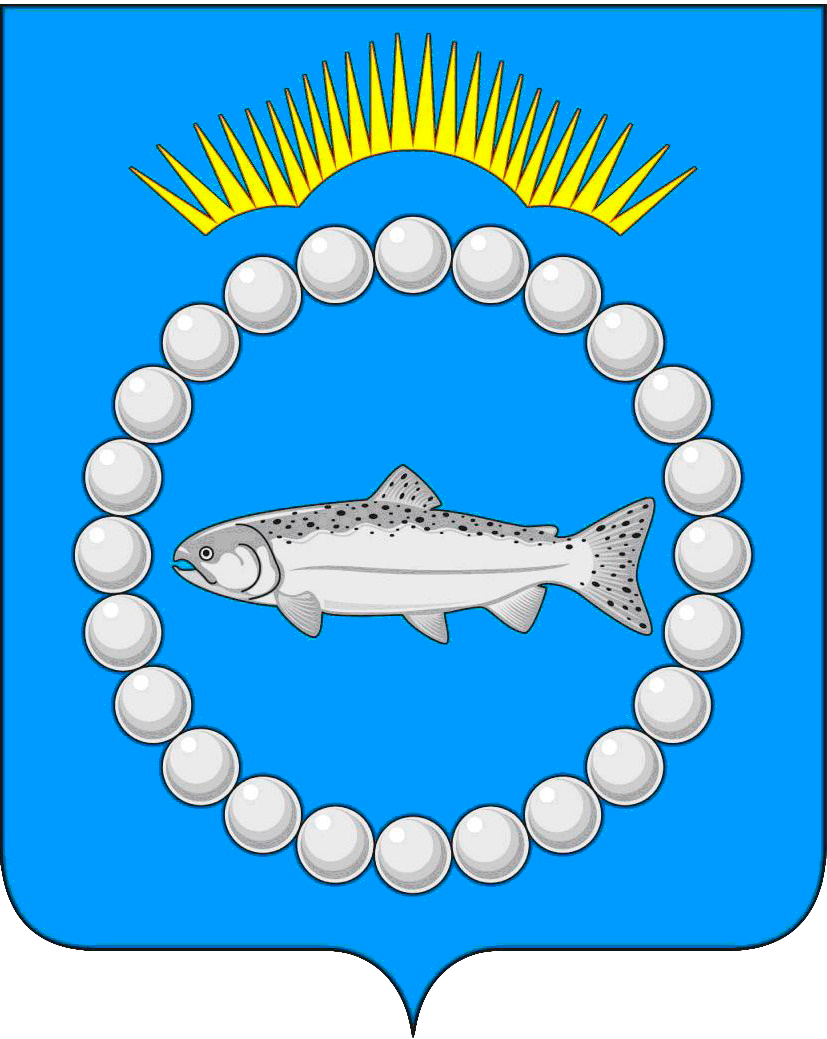
- Flag Coat of arms
- Tersky District in Murmansk Oblast
- Coordinates: 66°41′N 34°20′E
- Country: Russia
- Federal subject: Murmansk Oblast
- Established: August 1, 1927
- Administrative center: Umba

Government
  - Type: Local government
  - Body: Council of Deputies
  - Head: Leonid Shevelyov

Area
  - Total: 19,300 km^{2} (7,500 sq mi)

Population (2010 Census)
  - Total: 6,288
  - Density: 0.326/km^{2} (0.844/sq mi)
  - Urban: 88.0%
  - Rural: 12.0%

Administrative structure
  - Inhabited localities: 1 urban-type settlements, 11 rural localities

Municipal structure
  - Municipally incorporated as: Tersky Municipal District
  - Municipal divisions: 1 urban settlements, 1 rural settlements
- Time zone: UTC+3 (MSK)
- OKTMO ID: 47620000
- Website: http://www.terskyrayon.ru/

Tersky District (Russian: Те́рский райо́н) is an administrative district (raion), one of the six in Murmansk Oblast, Russia. Municipally, it is incorporated as Tersky Municipal District. It is located in the south of the Kola Peninsula and borders the White Sea in the south. The area of the district is 19,300 square kilometers (7,500 sq mi). Its administrative center is the urban locality (an urban-type settlement) of Umba. District's population: 6,288 (2010 census); 7,434 (2002 census); 9,752 (1989 Soviet census). The population of Umba accounts for 88.0% of the district's total population.

== Geography ==
Most of the district's territory is at a low elevation, but there are some hills in the west. It has many lakes, such as Lakes Kanozero, Segozero, and Vyalozero, and many rivers, including the Vyala, the Serga, and the Umba.

== History ==
The district was established on August 1, 1927, when the All-Russian Central Executive Committee (VTsIK) issued two Resolutions: "On the Establishment of Leningrad Oblast" and "On the Borders and Composition of the Okrugs of Leningrad Oblast". According to these resolutions, Murmansk Governorate was transformed into Murmansk Okrug, which was divided into six districts (Tersky being one of them) and included in Leningrad Oblast. The administrative center of the district was established in the selo of Kuzomen; however, it was transferred to Umba on August 15, 1931.

In 1934, the Murmansk Okrug Executive Committee developed a redistricting proposal, which was approved by the Resolution of the 4th Plenary Session of the Murmansk Okrug Committee of the VKP(b) on December 28-29, 1934 and by the Resolution of the Presidium of the Murmansk Okrug Executive Committee on February 2, 1935. On February 15, 1935, the VTsIK approved the redistricting of the okrug into seven districts, but did not specify what territories the new districts were to include. On February 26, 1935, the Presidium of the Leningrad Oblast Executive Committee worked out the details of the new district scheme and issued a resolution, which, among other things, moved the administrative center of Tersky District to the work settlement of Lesnoy.

On December 26, 1962, when the Presidium of the Supreme Soviet of the RSFSR decreed to re-organize the Soviets of People's Deputies and the executive committees of the krais, oblasts, and districts into the industrial and agricultural soviets, Murmansk Oblast was not affected and kept one unified Oblast Soviet and the executive committee. Nevertheless, on February 1, 1963, the Decree by the Presidium of the Supreme Soviet of the RSFSR established the new structure of the districts of Murmansk Oblast, which classified Tersky District as rural. However, this classification only lasted for less than two years. The November 21, 1964 Decree by the Presidium of the Supreme Soviet of the RSFSR restored the unified Soviets of People's Deputies and the executive committees of the krais and oblasts where the division into the urban and rural districts was introduced in 1962, and the districts of Murmansk Oblast were re-categorized as regular districts again by the January 12, 1965 Presidium of the Supreme Soviet of the RSFSR Decree.

== Economy ==
There is almost no heavy industry in the district. Fishing is the main economic activity. There are large reserves of pegmatite. The timber industry makes up over half of the industrial production of the district. Unemployment is the biggest problem in the district, with the unemployment rate being 19.3%.

== Politics ==
The local representative body is the Council of Deputies of Tersky District. It has fifteen deputies elected for a four-year term. The Chair of the Council of Deputies is Sergey Volkov. The Head of the District Administration is Leonid Shevelyov, who was appointed by the Council of Deputies.

== Notable residents ==
- Alexander Krutov (born 1947), nationalist politician and journalist
- Agrafena Kryukova (1855–1921), storyteller born in Chavanga, a Pomor village on the Tersky Coast
