= Kolsky District =

Kolsky District Кольский район (Russian)
- District
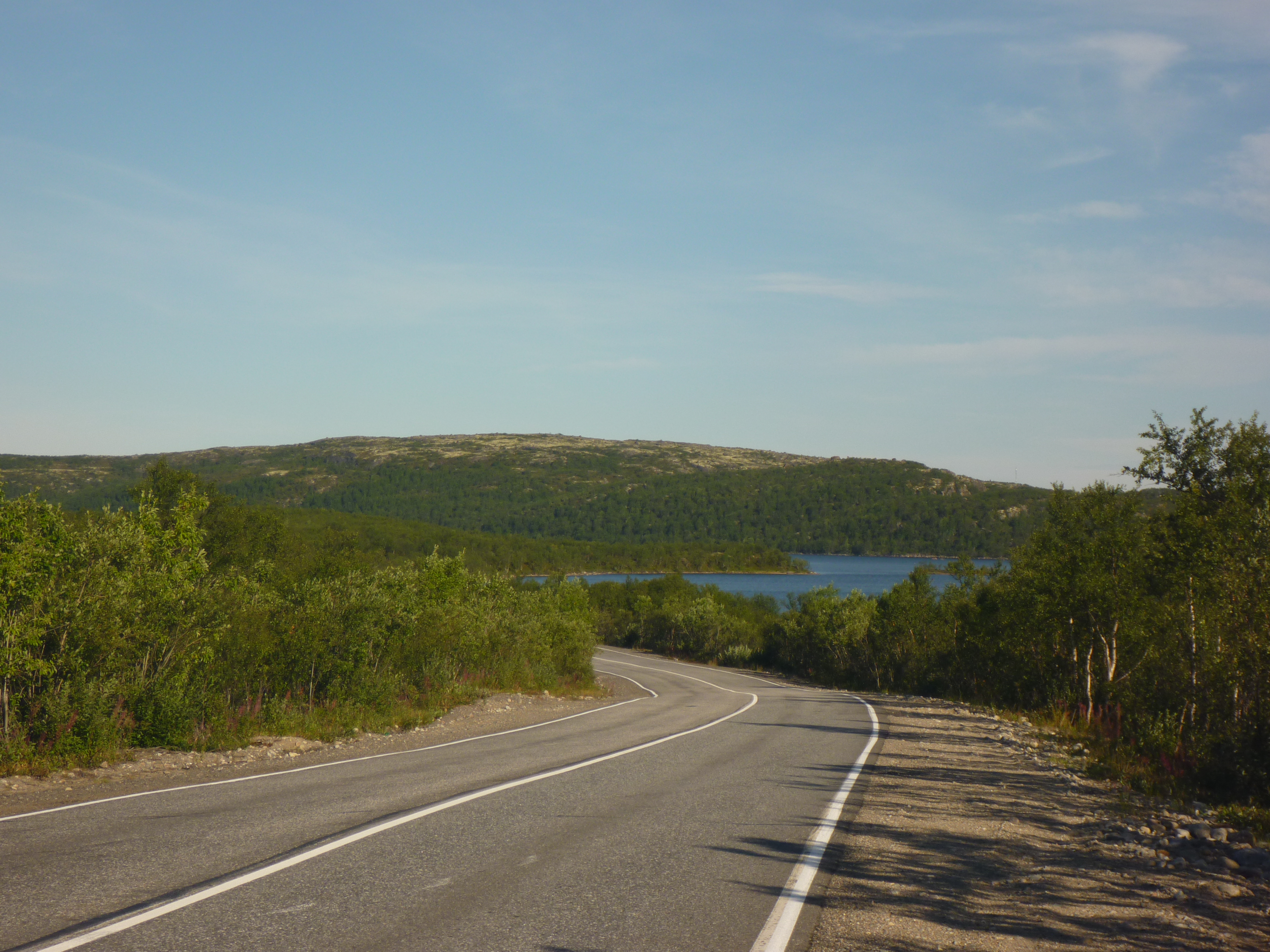
- Landscape in Kolsky District

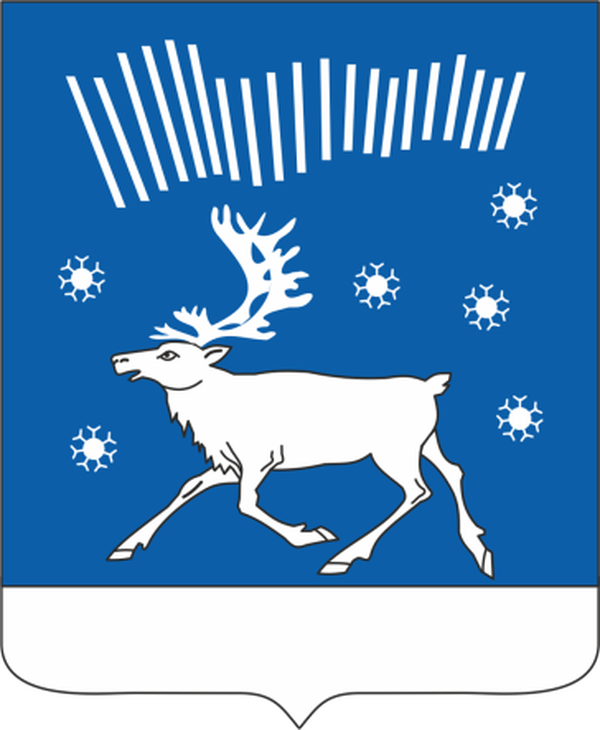
- Coat of arms
- Location of Kolsky District in Murmansk Oblast
- Coordinates: 68°53′N 33°03′E
- Country: Russia
- Federal subject: Murmansk Oblast
- Established: August 1, 1927
- Administrative center: Kola

Government
  - Type: Local government
  - Body: Council of Deputies
  - Head: Mikhail Chekrygin

Area
  - Total: 27,600 km^{2} (10,700 sq mi)

Population (2010 Census)
  - Total: 44,670
  - Density: 1.62/km^{2} (4.19/sq mi)
  - Urban: 76.4%
  - Rural: 23.6%

Administrative structure
  - Administrative divisions: 1 Towns, 5 Urban-type settlements, 5 Territorial okrugs
  - Inhabited localities: 1 cities/towns, 5 urban-type settlements, 26 rural localities

Municipal structure
  - Municipally incorporated as: Kolsky Municipal District
  - Municipal divisions: 6 urban settlements, 5 rural settlements
- Time zone: UTC+3 (MSK)
- OKTMO ID: 47605000
- Holiday: August 1
- Website: http://kola.murmansk.ru

Kolsky District (Russian: Ко́льский райо́н) is an administrative district (raion), one of the six in Murmansk Oblast, Russia. As a municipal division, it is incorporated as Kolsky Municipal District. It is located in the northwest of the oblast, partially lies on the Kola Peninsula, and borders with the Barents Sea in the north and Finland in the west. The area of the district is 27,600 square kilometers (10,700 sq mi). Its administrative center is the town of Kola. Population: 44,670 (2010 census); 51,125 (2002 census); 73,555 (1989 Soviet census). The population of Kola accounts for 23.4% of the district's total population.

== Geography ==
Kolsky District is bordered on the west by Pechengsky District, on the southwest by Finland, and on the north by the Barents Sea. The terrain is mostly flat forest (taiga) and rocky tundra. The district mostly covers the Tuloma River and the Kola River, which flow north into Kola Bay and the Barents Sea. The Tuloma River flows out of Lake Notozero, which in turn is fed from the southwest by the Nota River and the Lutto (river).

== History ==
It was established as Kolsko-Loparsky District (Ко́льско-Лопа́рский райо́н) on August 1, 1927, when the All-Russian Central Executive Committee (VTsIK) issued two Resolutions: "On the Establishment of Leningrad Oblast" and "On the Borders and Composition of the Okrugs of Leningrad Oblast". According to these resolutions, Murmansk Governorate was transformed into Murmansk Okrug, which was divided into six districts (Kolsko-Loparsky being one of them) and included into Leningrad Oblast. The administrative center of the district was in the selo of Kola. Upon establishment, the territory of the former Kolsko-Loparskaya Volost and of Minkinsky Selsoviet of the former Alexandrovskaya Volost were included into the district.

In 1934, the Murmansk Okrug Executive Committee developed a redistricting proposal, which was approved by the Resolution of the 4th Plenary Session of the Murmansk Okrug Committee of the VKP(b) on December 28-29, 1934 and by the Resolution of the Presidium of the Murmansk Okrug Executive Committee on February 2, 1935. According to this proposal, Kolsko-Loparsky District was to be abolished, with Kirovsky and Kolsky Districts to be established in its place. On February 15, 1935, the VTsIK approved the redistricting of the okrug into seven districts, but did not specify what territories the new districts were to include. On February 26, 1935, the Presidium of the Leningrad Oblast Executive Committee worked out the details of the new district scheme and issued a resolution which established Kirovsky District on part of the territory of Kolsko-Loparsky District, including the town of Kirovsk with the work settlement of Kukisvumchorr in its jurisdiction, Yena-Babinsky Selsoviet, and the southern part of Ekostrovsky Selsoviet with the station of Khibiny. Minkinsky Selsoviet of Kolsko-Loparsky District was transferred to Polyarny District, and Kildinsky Selsoviet—to Lovozersky District. Kolsky, Notozersky, Peyvo-Yarvinsky, and Pulozersky Selsoviets, as well as the northern part of Ekostrovsky Selsoviet remained in Kolsko-Loparsky District, which was renamed Kolsky. The administrative center of Kolsky District was slated to be moved to the station of Laplandiya, but temporarily remained in Kola. On June 1, 1936, the renaming of the district was approved by the Resolution of the VTsIK.

The provisions of the February 26, 1935 Resolution, however, were not fully implemented. The station of Laplandiya ultimately never became the administrative center of the district, because Kola was not included into Murmansk as originally intended.

On April 21, 1935, the territory of Ekostrovsky Selsoviet which remained in Kolsky District was re-organized as Imandrovsky Selsoviet by the Resolution of the Presidium of Murmansk Okrug Executive Committee. By the Act of the conciliatory committee on October 20, 1935, the selsoviet was transferred to Kirovsky District—a decision approved by the Presidium of Murmansk Okrug Executive Committee on December 4, 1935 and by the Presidium of Leningrad Oblast Executive Committee on April 5, 1936.

On November 25, 1935, the Presidium of the VTsIK granted work settlement status to the inhabited locality of Moncha-Guba, and renamed it Monchegorsk. At the same time, it was transferred from Kolsky to Kirovsky District.

The work settlement of Nagornovsky and its settlement soviet were transferred from Kolsky District to the administrative jurisdiction of Murmansk City Soviet by the Decree of the Presidium of the Supreme Soviet of the Russian SFSR of August 5, 1953.

When Polyarny District was abolished on July 9, 1960, a part of its territory was transferred to Kolsky District.

On December 26, 1962, when the Presidium of the Supreme Soviet of the RSFSR decreed to re-organize the Soviets of People's Deputies and the executive committees of the krais, oblasts, and districts into the industrial and agricultural soviets, Murmansk Oblast was not affected and kept one unified Oblast Soviet and the executive committee. Nevertheless, on February 1, 1963, the Decree by the Presidium of the Supreme Soviet of the RSFSR established the new structure of the districts of Murmansk Oblast, which classified Kolsky District as rural. However, this classification only lasted for less than two years. The November 21, 1964 Decree by the Presidium of the Supreme Soviet of the RSFSR restored the unified Soviets of People's Deputies and the executive committees of the krais and oblasts where the division into the urban and rural districts was introduced in 1962, and the districts of Murmansk Oblast were re-categorized as regular districts again by the January 12, 1965 Presidium of the Supreme Soviet of the RSFSR Decree.

By the August 2, 1965 Presidium of the Supreme Soviet of the RSFSR Decree, the work settlement of Kola was granted a status of town under district jurisdiction.

== Economy ==
Kolsky District has many natural resources, including forests, ore deposits and water life. Atlantic salmon is fished in the rivers of the district. Ore deposits include copper, nickel, and titanium. The area also produces construction materials.

== Politics ==
The local representative body is the Council of Deputies of Kolsky District. It has twenty members elected for a term of five years. The Head of the District is the highest executive post and is elected by the Council of Deputies.
