= Administrative divisions of Murmansk Oblast =

Murmansk Oblast, Russia
- Administrative center: Murmansk

As of 2015:
- Districts: 6
- Cities/towns: 16
- Urban-type settlements: 11
- Rural localities: 112
- Uninhabited rural localities: 14

Murmansk Oblast is a federal subject of Russia, which is located in the northwestern part of the country, occupying mostly the Kola Peninsula. The oblast itself was established on May 28, 1938, but some kind of administrative organization of the territory existed here since at least the 13th century. As of the 2002 Census, Russians account for the majority of the oblast's population (85.3%, or 760,862 people), with the indigenous Sami constituting only a 0.20% minority (1,769 people).

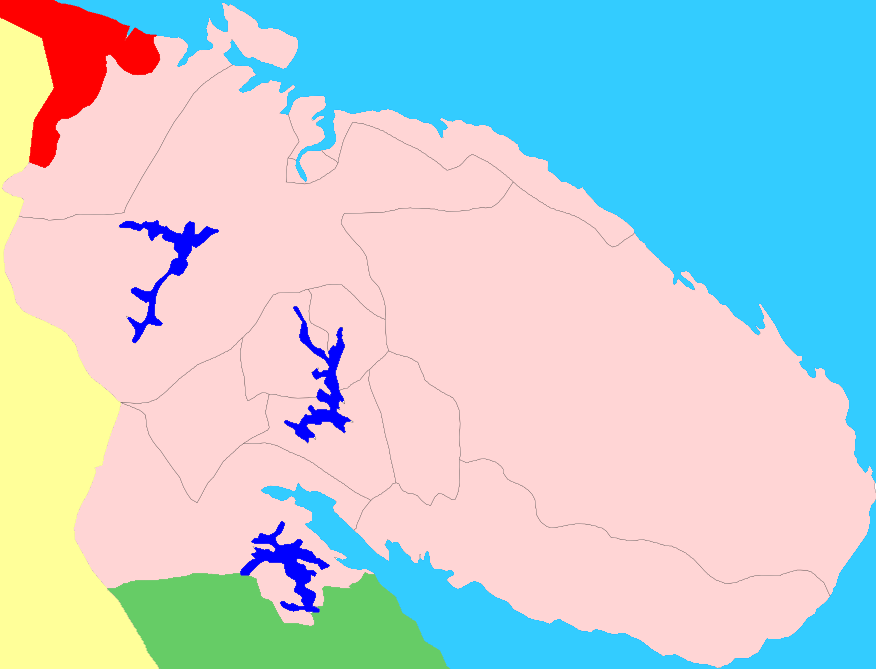
Map of the Murmansk Oblast

Since establishing and maintaining the structure of the administrative divisions of the federal subjects is not explicitly specified in the Constitution of Russia as the responsibility of the federal government, this task falls within the scope of the responsibilities of Murmansk Oblast itself. Changes of the administrative-territorial structure of Murmansk Oblast are authorized by the Murmansk Oblast Duma.

The oblast's administrative divisions remained largely unchanged from the structure used during the Soviet era, with the notable exception of selsoviets—a low-level administrative unit type abolished after the new law on the administrative-territorial divisions had been adopted in January 1998.

== Administrative and municipal divisions ==
Map

| Division | | Structure | | OKATO | OKTMO | Urban-type settlement/ district-level town* |
| Division | | Administrative | Municipal | OKATO | OKTMO | Urban-type settlement/ district-level town* |
|---|---|---|---|---|---|---|
| Alexandrovsk (Александровск) | | city (ZATO) | urban okrug | 47 525; 47 527; 47 529 | 47 737 | Polyarny (Полярный) town*; Snezhnogorsk (Снежногорск) town*; Gadzhiyevo (Гаджиево) town* |
| Ostrovnoy (Островной) | | city (ZATO) | urban okrug | 47 531 | 47 731 | |
| Severomorsk (Североморск) | | city (ZATO) | urban okrug | 47 530 | 47 730 | Safonovo (Сафоново) |
| Zaozyorsk (Заозёрск) | | city (ZATO) | urban okrug | 47 533 | 47 733 | |
| Vidyayevo (Видяево) | | urban-type settlement (ZATO) | urban okrug | 47 000 | 47 735 | |
| Murmansk (Мурманск) | | city | urban okrug | 47 401 | 47 701 | |
| ↳ | Leninsky (Ленинский) | (under Murmansk) | — | 47 401 | — | |
| ↳ | Oktyabrsky | (under Murmansk) | — | 47 401 | — | |
| ↳ | Pervomaysky (Первомайский) | (under Murmansk) | — | 47 401 | — | |
| Apatity (Апатиты) | | city | urban okrug | 47 405 | 47 705 | |
| Kirovsk (Кировск) | | city | urban okrug | 47 412 | 47 712 | |
| Monchegorsk (Мончегорск) | | city | urban okrug | 47 415 | 47 715 | |
| Olenegorsk (Оленегорск) | | city | urban okrug | 47 417 | 47 717 | |
| Polyarnye Zori (Полярные Зори) | | city | urban okrug | 47 419 | 47 719 | |
| Kovdorsky (Ковдорский) | | district | | 47 203 | 47 703 | Kovdor (Ковдор) town* |
| Kolsky (Кольский) | | district | | 47 205 | 47 605 | Kola (Кола) town*; Kildinstroy (Кильдинстрой); Molochny (Молочный); Murmashi (Мурмаши); Tumanny (Туманный); Verkhnetulomsky (Верхнетуломский) |
| Kandalakshsky (Кандалакшский) | | district | | 47 408 | 47 608 | Kandalaksha (Кандалакша) town*; Zelenoborsky (Зеленоборский) |
| Lovozersky (Ловозерский) | | district | | 47 210 | 47 610 | Revda (Ревда) |
| Pechengsky (Печенгский) | | district | | 47 215 | 47 615 | Zapolyarny (Заполярный) town*; Nikel (Никель); Pechenga (Печенга) |
| Tersky (Терский) | | district | | 47 220 | 47 620 | Umba (Умба) |

== Historical background ==
The territory on which modern Murmansk Oblast is located has been settled by humans since the 3rd millennium BCE, and by the end of the 1st millennium CE, it was settled only by the Sami people. In the 12th century, Russian Pomors from the shores of Onega Bay and in the lower reaches of the Northern Dvina River started regular hunting and fishing visits to the area and started barter trade with the Sami. They also called the White Sea coast of the peninsula Tersky Coast, or Terskaya Land. Pomors were soon followed by the tribute collectors from the Novgorod Republic, and the Kola Peninsula gradually became a part of the Novgorodian lands. A 1265 treaty of Yaroslav Yaroslavich with Novgorod mentions Tre Volost, which continued to be mentioned in other documents until as late as 1471. Another known administrative divisions in this area was Kolo Volost, which bordered Tre approximately along the line between Kildin Island and Turiy Headland of the Turiy Peninsula. Kolo Volost laid to the west of that line, while Tre was situated to the east of it.

In the 15th century, Novgorodians started to establish permanent settlements on the Kola Peninsula. Administratively, this territory was divided into Varzuzhskaya and Umbskaya Volosts, which were governed by a posadnik from the area of the Northern Dvina. The Novgorod Republic lost control of both of these volosts to the Grand Duchy of Moscow after the Battle of Shelon in 1471, and the republic itself ceased to exist in 1478 when Ivan III took the city of Novgorod. All Novgorod territories, including those on the Kola Peninsula, became a part of the Grand Duchy of Moscow.

In the second half of the 16th century, King Frederick II of Denmark–Norway demanded the Tsardom of Russia to cede the peninsula. Russia declined, and in order to organize adequate defenses established the position of a voyevoda, who sat in Kola, which became an administrative center of the region. Newly established Kolsky Uyezd covered most of the territory of the modern oblast, and continued to exist well into the 19th century.

In 1854, after having been reduced nearly to ashes as a result of a bombardment by a British ship, the town of Kola went into decline. As a result, on December 13 [O.S. December 2], 1858, Tsar Alexander II approved a State Council opinion "On Changing the Governance in the Town of Kola and in Kolsky Uyezd" that Kolsky Uyezd be abolished and its territory merged into Kemsky Uyezd. However, on February 19 [O.S. February 8], 1883 when Tsar Alexander III approved a new opinion of the State Council, the uyezd was restored, although the territory of the restored uyezd was smaller than its pre-1858 territory.

In 1896, Alexandrovsk was founded and grew in size so quickly that it was granted town status in 1899; Kolsky Uyezd was renamed Alexandrovsky on that occasion. In 1916, Romanov-na-Murmane (modern Murmansk) was founded and quickly grew to become the largest city on the peninsula.

When the White movement controlled the northwest of Russia in 1918–1920, Alexandrovsky Uyezd was included into Northern Oblast. On February 2, 1920, Murmansk Governorate was established by the Resolution of the Provisional Government of Northern Oblast; it included the territory of Alexandrovsky Uyezd. The uyezd, however, was restored in its 1917 borders after Murmansk Governorate was abolished effective February 21, 1920 when the Soviet power was restored on the Kola Peninsula.

In June 1921, Alexandrovsky Uyezd was transformed into Murmansk Governorate by the Soviet government. On August 1, 1927, the All-Russian Central Executive Committee (VTsIK) issued two Resolutions: "On the Establishment of Leningrad Oblast" and "On the Borders and Composition of the Okrugs of Leningrad Oblast", according to which Murmansk Governorate was transformed into Murmansk Okrug (which was divided into six districts) and included into Leningrad Oblast. This arrangement existed until May 28, 1938, when the okrug was separated from Leningrad Oblast, merged with Kandalakshsky District of the Karelian ASSR, and transformed into Murmansk Oblast.

Administrative divisions of Murmansk Oblast upon its establishment in May 1938
- Cities and towns: 1. Murmansk (administrative center)
- Districts: 1. Kandalakshsky; 2. Kirovsky; 3. Kolsky; 4. Lovozersky; 5. Polyarny; 6. Saamsky; 7. Teribersky; 8. Tersky

By the Decree of the Presidium of the Supreme Soviet of the Russian SFSR of September 11, 1938, the administrative center of Polyarny District was moved from Murmansk to Ura-Guba and in December 1938, new Monchegorsky District was formed. In September 1939, the rural locality of Polyarnoye was transformed into a town under oblast jurisdiction and renamed Polyarny and the town Kandalaksha was separated from Kandalakshsky District and elevated to the same status in February 1940.

After the Winter War of 1939–1940, the western parts of the Rybachy and Sredny Peninsulas were ceded by Finland to the Soviet Union by the Moscow Peace Treaty. By the July 13, 1940 Decision of the Murmansk Oblast Executive Committee, these territories were appended to Polyarny District of Murmansk Oblast.

On July 21, 1945, the Presidium of the Supreme Soviet of the Soviet Union decreed to establish Pechengsky District with the administrative center in Nikel on the territory of Petsamo ceded by Finland to the Soviet Union as part of the Moscow Armistice signed on September 19, 1944 and to include this district as a part of Murmansk Oblast. In 1947, Finland additionally sold the remaining 169 square kilometers (65 sq mi) Jäniskoski area with its hydroelectric plant, in exchange for Soviet confiscated German investments in Finland. Since then, with the exception of a minor transfer in 1987, the external borders of the oblast remained unchanged.

In August 1948, Kandalakshsky District was abolished and its territory administratively subordinated to the town of Kandalaksha. In December 1949, when by the Decree of the Presidium of the Supreme Soviet of the Soviet Union Monchegorsk was elevated in status to that of a town under oblast jurisdiction, with the former Monchegorsky District's territory passing into its subordination.

The Decree of the Presidium of the Supreme Soviet of the Soviet Union of March 13, 1951 reinstated Kandalakshsky District in its old borders, and Kandalaksha again became its administrative center.

On April 18, 1951, Vayenga was elevated in status to that of a town under oblast jurisdiction and renamed Severomorsk. On April 26, 1951, by the Decision of Murmansk Oblast Executive Committee, several inhabited localities of Polyarny District were passed into its jurisdiction.

Kirovsk was elevated in status to that of a town under oblast jurisdiction on May 6, 1954 by the Decree of the Presidium of the Supreme Soviet of the Soviet Union; at the same time Kirovsky District was abolished, and its territory was subordinated to Kirovsk. Polyarny, on the other hand, was demoted to a town under district jurisdiction and subordinated to Polyarny District by the June 14, 1956 Decree of the Presidium of the Supreme Soviet of the RSFSR.

Administrative divisions of Murmansk Oblast in 1958
- Cities and towns: 1. Murmansk (okrug administrative center); 2. Kandalaksha; 3. Kirovsk; 4. Monchegorsk; 5. Severomorsk
- Districts: 1. Kandalakshsky; 2. Kolsky; 3. Lovozersky; 4. Pechengsky District; 5. Polyarny; 6. Saamsky; 7. Teribersky; 8. Tersky

By the Decree of the Presidium of the Supreme Soviet of the Russian SFSR of March 19, 1959, the Councils of Deputies of Kandalaksha and of Kandalakshsky District were merged into one Kandalaksha Town Council of Deputies. While the district was nominally retained as a separate administrative division, all its subdivisions were administratively subordinated to the town's Council of Deputies.

The Decree of the Presidium of the Supreme Soviet of the RSFSR of July 9, 1960 abolished Polyarny District, the territory of which was divided between Kolsky, Pechengsky, and Teribersky Districts, with the town of Polyarny being administratively subordinated to the town of Severomorsk. At the same time, the territory of Teribersky District was also merged with the territory of Severomorsk, to which the district's subdivisions were subordinated. Teribersky District was nominally retained as an administrative division and renamed Severomorsky.

Saamsky District was abolished by the Decision of the Murmansk Oblast Executive Committee of January 26, 1963. The district's selsoviets were transferred to Lovozersky District, while Gremikha, the administrative center of the former district, was subordinated to Severomorsk.

On December 26, 1962, when the Presidium of the Supreme Soviet of the RSFSR decreed to re-organize the Soviets of People's Deputies and the executive committees of the krais, oblasts, and districts into the industrial and agricultural soviets, Murmansk Oblast was not affected and kept one unified Oblast Soviet and the executive committee. Nevertheless, on February 1, 1963, the Decree by the Presidium of the Supreme Soviet of the RSFSR established the new structure of the districts of Murmansk Oblast, which no longer included Kandalakshsky and Severomorsky Districts and classified the remaining districts as rural. Subordination of Olenegorsk to Monchegorsk and of Polyarny to Severomorsk remained unchanged.

Administrative divisions of Murmansk Oblast in February 1963
- Cities and towns: 1. Murmansk (oblast administrative center); 2. Kandalaksha; 3. Kirovsk; 4. Monchegorsk; 5. Severomorsk
- Districts: 1. Kolsky; 2. Lovozersky; 3. Pechengsky; 4. Tersky

The classification of the districts as rural only lasted for less than two years. The November 21, 1964 Decree by the Presidium of the Supreme Soviet of the RSFSR restored the unified Soviets of People's Deputies and the executive committees of the krais and oblasts where the division into the urban and rural districts was introduced in 1962, and the districts of Murmansk Oblast were re-categorized as regular districts again by the January 12, 1965 Presidium of the Supreme Soviet of the RSFSR Decree.

On January 6, 1966, the Murmansk Oblast Executive Committee petitioned to transform the work settlement of Molodyozhny in jurisdiction of Kirovsk into a town under oblast jurisdiction called Khibinogorsk and on subordinating a part of the territory under Kirovsk's jurisdiction to it. The petition was reviewed by the Presidium of the Supreme Soviet of the RSFSR, which, however, decreed on July 7, 1966 to merge the work settlements of Molodyozhny and Apatity into a town under oblast jurisdiction, which would retain the name Apatity. Consequently, the Murmansk Oblast Executive Committee subordinated a part of the territory in Kirovsk's jurisdiction to the new town by the decision of October 13, 1966.

On November 29, 1979, the Presidium of the Supreme Soviet of the RSFSR decreed to establish Kovdorsky District on the parts of the territories previously in jurisdiction of Apatity.

Olenegorsk was elevated in status to that of a town under oblast jurisdiction by the August 10, Presidium of the Supreme Soviet of the RSFSR Decree, and several inhabited localities previously subordinated to Monchegorsk were transferred to Olenegorsk by the August 26, 1981 Decision of the Murmansk Oblast Executive Committee. Next was the town of Polyarny, which was granted the same status by the June 17, 1983 Decree, and to which several inhabited localities previously subordinated to Severomorsk were transferred by the August 10, 1983 Decision of the Murmansk Oblast Executive Committee.

On November 17, 1987, the Presidium of the Supreme Soviet of the RSFSR decreed to transfer the settlement of the railway station of Poyakonda from Tedinsky Selsoviet of Loukhsky District of the Karelian ASSR to Murmansk Oblast. By the Decision of the Murmansk Oblast Executive Committee of January 20, 1988, the settlement was merged with the inhabited locality of Poyakonda on the territory in jurisdiction of the town of Kandalaksha. The transfer marked the only time the external borders of the oblast changed between 1947 and present.

By the Presidium of the Supreme Soviet of the Russian SFSR Decree of April 22, 1991, the work settlement of Polyarnye Zori in jurisdiction of the town of Apatity was elevated in status to that of a town under oblast jurisdiction. A part of the territory in jurisdiction of Apatity was also transferred to Polyarnye Zori by the Decision of the Presidium of the Murmansk Oblast Soviet of People's Deputies of May 16, 1991.

Administrative divisions of Murmansk Oblast in October 1993
- Cities and towns: 1. Murmansk (oblast administrative center); 2. Apatity; 3. Kandalaksha; 4. Kirovsk; 4. Monchegorsk; 5. Olenegorsk; 6. Polyarny; 7. Polyarnye Zori; 8. Severomorsk
- Districts: 1. Kolsky; 2. Kovdorsky; 3. Lovozersky; 4. Pechengsky; 5. Tersky

The administrative-territorial structure of the oblast remained unchanged until January 1998, when a new law on the administrative-territorial division was adopted. The new law no longer included selsoviets as a lower-level administrative division, but it recognized closed administrative-territorial formations as a new type of an administrative-territorial unit, the status of which was equal to that of the districts and the cities/towns with jurisdictional territories.

Administrative divisions of Murmansk Oblast in January 1998
- Cities and towns with jurisdictional territories: 1. Murmansk (oblast administrative center); 2. Apatity; 3. Kandalaksha; 4. Kirovsk; 4. Monchegorsk; 5. Olenegorsk; 6. Polyarnye Zori
- Closed administrative-territorial formations: 1. Ostrovnoy; 2. Polyarny; 3. Severomorsk; 4. Skalisty; 5. Snezhnogorsk; 6. Zaozyorsk
- Districts: 1. Kolsky; 2. Kovdorsky; 3. Lovozersky; 4. Pechengsky; 5. Tersky

== Sources ==
- Главное управление геодезии и картографии при Совете Министров СССР. Научно-исследовательский географо-экономический институт Ленинградского государственного университета имени А. А. Жданова (1971). Атлас Мурманской области. Москва.
- Архивный отдел Администрации Мурманской области. Государственный Архив Мурманской области. (1995). Административно-территориальное деление Мурманской области (1920–1993 гг.). Справочник. Мурманск: Мурманское издательско-полиграфическое предприятие "Север".
- Президиум Верховного Совета РСФСР. Указ №741/18 от 9 июля 1960 г. «Об упразднении Полярного района, объединении Североморского городского и Териберского районного советов и переименовании Териберского района Мурманской области». Опубликован: "Ведомости ВС РСФСР", №25, ст. 371, 1960. (Presidium of the Supreme Soviet of the Russian SFSR. Decree #741/18 of July 9, 1960 On the Abolition of Polyarny District, the Merger of Severomorsk Town and Teribersky District Soviets, and the Renaming of Teribersky District of Murmansk Oblast. ).
- Мурманская областная Дума. Закон №96-01-ЗМО от 6 января 1998 г. «Об административно-территориальном устройстве Мурманской области», в ред. Закона №1953-01-ЗМО от 24 декабря 2015 г. «О внесении изменений в Закон Мурманской области "Об административно-территориальном устройстве Мурманской области"». Опубликован: "Мурманский Вестник", №10, стр. 3, 16 января 1998 г. (Murmansk Oblast Duma. Law #96-01-ZMO of January 6, 1998 On the Administrative-Territorial Structure of Murmansk Oblast, as amended by the Law #1953-01-ZMO of December 24, 2015 On Amending the Law of Murmansk Oblast "On the Administrative-Territorial Structure of Murmansk Oblast". ).
