= Zasheyek =

Zasheyek (Russian: Зашеек) is the name of several rural localities in Russia:

- Zasheyek, Republic of Karelia, a village in Loukhsky District of the Republic of Karelia
- Zasheyek, Murmansk Oblast, an inhabited locality under the administrative jurisdiction of Polyarnye Zori City with Jurisdictional Territory in Murmansk Oblast
