= Laplandiya =

Laplandiya Лапландия
- Railway station
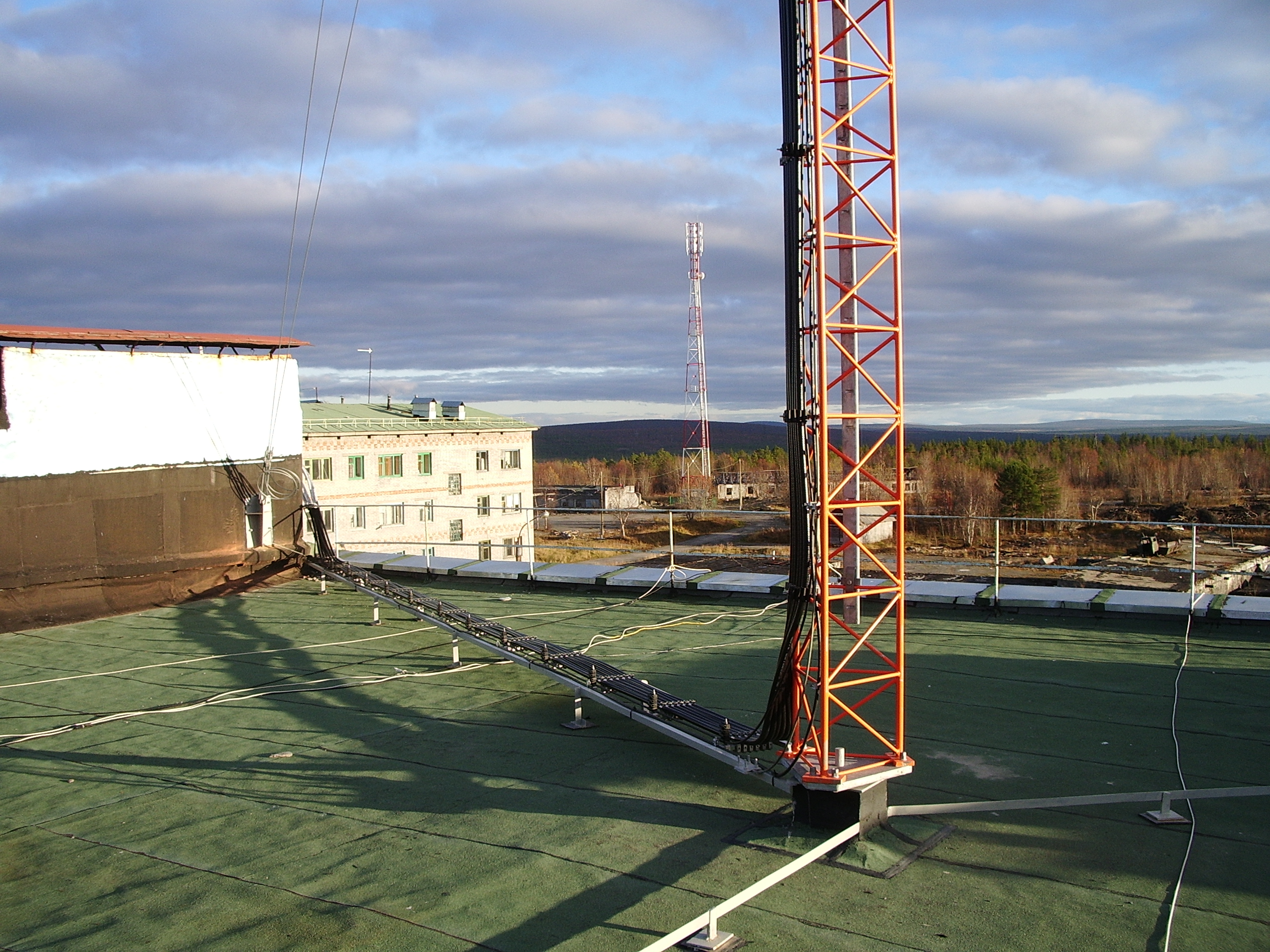
- Interactive map of Laplandiya
- Location of Laplandiya Laplandiya (Murmansk Oblast)
- Coordinates: 68°16′N 33°20′E
- Country: Russia
- Federal subject: Murmansk Oblast
- Founded: 1920s
- Elevation: 148 m (486 ft)

Population (2010 Census)
  - Total: 70
  - Estimate (2021): 0 (−100%)

Administrative status
  - Subordinated to: Olenegorsk Town with Jurisdictional Territory

Municipal status
  - Urban okrug: Olenegorsk Urban Okrug
- Time zone: UTC+3 (MSK)
- Postal code: 184525
- Dialing code: +7 81552
- OKTMO ID: 47717000116

Laplandiya (Russian: Лапла́ндия) is a rural locality (a railway station) in administrative jurisdiction of Olenegorsk Town with Jurisdictional Territory in Murmansk Oblast, Russia, located beyond the Arctic Circle on the Kola Peninsula at a height of 148 meters (486 ft) above sea level. As of the 2010 census, Laplandiya had a population of 70.

Laplandiya emerged along the Murman Railway in the 1920s. Peat extraction began in 1934, and from 1935 until the early 1940s, it was used to produce coke and tar. Between 1926 and 1938, the population of the settlement increased from 25 to 377. A second settlement called Laplandiya or Maselga (Масельга) existed some 4 kilometers (2.5 mi) south of the station settlement between the 1920s and 1930s.

On February 26, 1935, the executive committee of the Leningrad Oblast (which included the Murmansk Okrug at the time) made a decision to move the administrative center of the Kolsko-Loparsky District from Kola to Laplandiya, but this was never implemented. Laplandiya remained part of the Kolsky District until 1964, when it was placed under the jurisdiction of the town of Monchegorsk, as there was a diatomite plant in the settlement that was part of the Olenegorsk mines. The town of Olenegorsk became a separate administrative unit in 1981, after which Laplandiya has been under its jurisdiction.
