= Drozdovka =

Drozdovka (Russian: Дроздовка) is the name of several rural localities in Russia.

== Modern localities ==
- Drozdovka, Udmurt Republic, a village in Staroutchansky Selsoviet of Alnashsky District in the Udmurt Republic
- Drozdovka, Vladimir Oblast, a village in Kovrovsky District of Vladimir Oblast

== Abolished localities ==
- Drozdovka, Murmansk Oblast, an inhabited locality under the administrative jurisdiction of the closed administrative-territorial formation of Ostrovnoy in Murmansk Oblast; abolished in July 2013; 68°20′N 38°26′E
