= Zasheyek, Murmansk Oblast =

Zasheyek Зашеек
- Inhabited locality
- Interactive map of Zasheyek
- Location of Zasheyek Zasheyek (Murmansk Oblast)
- Coordinates: 67°24′N 32°33′E
- Country: Russia
- Federal subject: Murmansk Oblast
- Rural locality status since: January 1, 2005
- Elevation: 142 m (466 ft)

Population (2010 Census)
  - Total: 901
  - Estimate (2021): 554 (−38.5%)

Administrative status
  - Subordinated to: Polyarnye Zori Town with Jurisdictional Territory

Municipal status
  - Urban okrug: Polyarnye Zori Urban Okrug
- Time zone: UTC+3 (MSK)
- Postal code: 184225
- OKTMO ID: 47719000106

Zasheyek (Russian: Заше́ек) is a rural locality (an inhabited locality) in administrative jurisdiction of Polyarnye Zori Town with Jurisdictional Territory in Murmansk Oblast, Russia, located beyond the Arctic Circle on the Kola Peninsula at a height of 142 meters (466 ft) above sea level. Population: 901 (2010 Census).

Zasheyek was classified as an urban locality by the All-Russian Central Executive Committee (VTsIK) Resolution of August 20, 1935, when it was granted work settlement status. However, after the resolution had been published, it was pointed out that Zasheyek is simultaneously listed in Kirovsky District of Murmansk Okrug and in the Karelian ASSR, thus once again bringing attention to the issue with the border between the okrug and the Karelian ASSR. The joint meeting of the representatives of Murmansk Okrug and Karelia, which took place on April 15, 1936, was unable to resolve the situation. Only on April 1, 1937 the Presidium of the VTsIK approved the petition for transfer of several inhabited localities (including the work settlement of Zasheyek); however, the VTsIK did not list all of the inhabited localities being transferred by name, which led to the continuation of the dispute. After some back and forth, on July 15, 1937, the Presidium of the Murmansk Okrug Executive Committee called the problem "artificial" and declared that the transfer should not have even been discussed, since the inhabited locality in question had never officially been transferred out of the okrug and was being served solely by the Murmansk Okrug organizations anyway. Furthermore, the Presidium refused to approve the conciliatory commission's findings and petitioned to rescind the VTsIK's resolution of April 1, 1937 and to officially document the border between Murmansk Okrug and the Karelian ASSR. The disagreements continued, and the issue had not been officially resolved until 1938, when the transformation of Murmansk Okrug into Murmansk Oblast with the subsequent transfer of Kandalakshsky District to the oblast rendered the problem moot.

Zasheyek was demoted back to a rural locality on January 1, 2005.
