= Monchegorsky District =

Monchegorsky District (Russian: Мончего́рский райо́н) was an administrative division (a district) of Murmansk Okrug of Leningrad Oblast, and later of Murmansk Oblast of the Russian SFSR, Soviet Union, which existed in 1938–1949.

== History ==
The work settlement of Monchegorsk in the 1930s was the center of copper and nickel mining in the Monchetundra Massif of the Kola Peninsula, and was administratively a part of Kirovsky District of Murmansk Okrug. By 1937, the copper-nickel mining volume increased significantly, and, consequently, the area's population grew as well. On February 19, 1937 the Presidium of the Murmansk Okrug Executive Committee petitioned to create a new Monchegorsky District by separating the town and its surrounding area from Kirovsky District and to grant Monchegorsk town status. While town status was granted to Monchegorsk by the VTsIK Resolution of September 20, 1937, no new district was formed. On October 10, 1937, Monchegorsk town council was subordinated directly to the Murmansk Okrug Executive Committee.

On December 21, 1937, the Presidium of the Murmansk Okrug Executive Committee again petitioned to create a new district with the administrative center in Monchegorsk. In a letter to the Leningrad Oblast Executive Committee and the VTsIK, the Presidium noted that Kirovsky District has two developed but unrelated industrial centers—Kirovsk and Monchegorsk—with the latter having a larger population and being located 111 kilometers (69 mi) away from the former. The petition was again unsuccessful—when on February 10, 1938 the VTsIK adopted a new Resolution changing the administrative-territorial structure of Leningrad Oblast (of which Murmansk Okrug was a part), Monchegorsk remained a part of Kirovsky District.

On May 16, 1938, the VTsIK finally issued a Resolution to create Monchegorsky District in Murmansk Okrug of Leningrad Oblast on the territory of the town of Monchegorsky and Imandrovsky Selsoviet. However, since Murmansk Okrug itself was abolished only a few days later on May 27, 1938, the district had not been formed and even the Resolution itself had not been published.

Monchegorsky District was eventually formed by the VTsIK Resolution of December 27, 1938, after the creation of Murmansk Oblast. It existed until December 9, 1949, when by the Decree of the Presidium of the Supreme Council of the Soviet Union Monchegorsk was elevated in status to that of a town under oblast jurisdiction, with the former district's territory passing into its subordination.
