= Yagelny Bor =

Yagelny Bor Ягельный Бор
- Station
- Interactive map of Yagelny Bor
- Location of Yagelny Bor Yagelny Bor (Murmansk Oblast)
- Coordinates: 68°5′16″N 33°20′55″E
- Country: Russia
- Federal subject: Murmansk Oblast
- Administrative district: Olenegorsk
- Founded: 1920s

Population (2010 Census)
  - Total: 0
  - Estimate (2005): 3 )
- Time zone: UTC+3 (MSK)
- Postal code: 184533
- Dialing code: +7 81552
- OKTMO ID: 47717000121

Yagelny Bor (Russian: Ягельный Бор) is the rural locality (a Station) in Olenegorsk municipality of Murmansk Oblast, Russia. The village is located beyond the Arctic Circle, on the Kola Peninsula. Located at a height of 154 m above sea level.
