= Olenegorsk, Murmansk Oblast =

Town in Murmansk Oblast, Russia

Olenegorsk Оленегорск
- Town
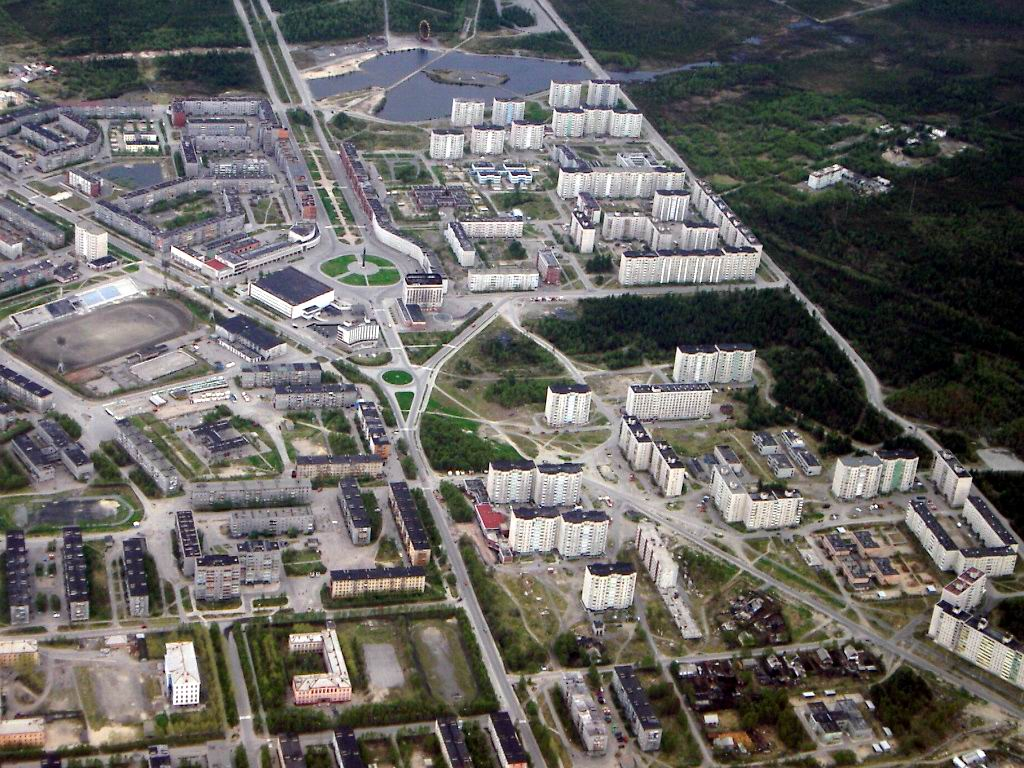
- Aerial view of Olenegorsk

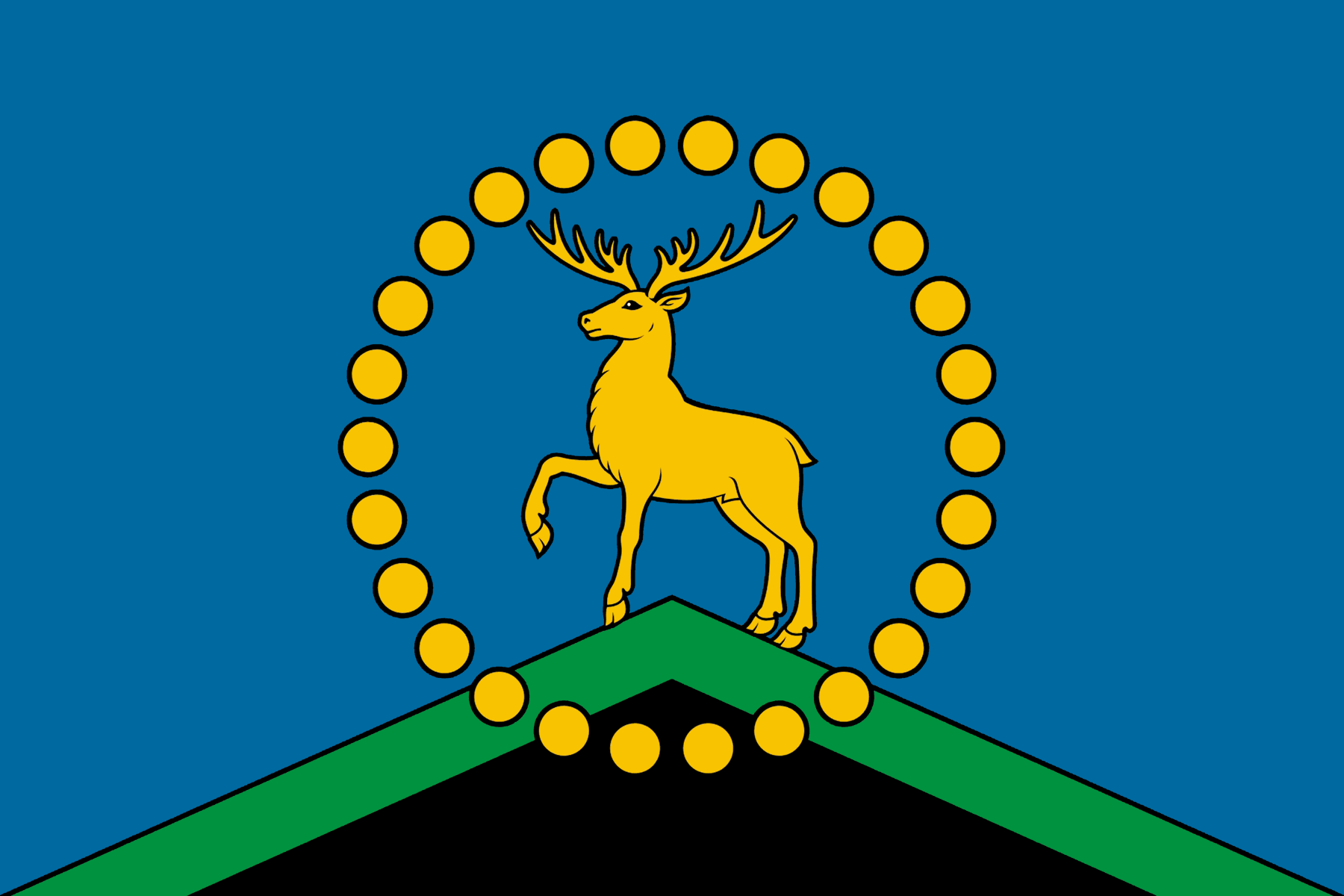
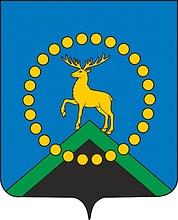
- Flag Coat of arms
- Interactive map of Olenegorsk
- Location of Olenegorsk Olenegorsk (Murmansk Oblast)
- Coordinates: 68°09′N 33°17′E
- Country: Russia
- Federal subject: Murmansk Oblast
- Founded: 1949
- Town status since: March 27, 1957

Government
  - Mayor: Oleg Samarsky
- Elevation: 170 m (560 ft)

Population (2010 Census)
  - Total: 23,072
  - Estimate (2022): 19,533 (−15.3%)

Administrative status
  - Subordinated to: Olenegorsk Town with Jurisdictional Territory
  - Capital of: Olenegorsk Town with Jurisdictional Territory

Municipal status
  - Urban okrug: Olenegorsk Urban Okrug
  - Capital of: Olenegorsk Urban Okrug
- Time zone: UTC+3 (MSK)
- Postal code: 184530
- Dialing code: +7 81552
- OKTMO ID: 47717000001
- Website: www.gorodolenegorsk.ru

Olenegorsk (Russian: Оленего́рск, lit. reindeer mountain) is a town in Murmansk Oblast, Russia, located north of the Arctic Circle, 112 kilometers (70 mi) south of Murmansk. Population: 23,072 (2010 census); 25,166 (2002 Census); 35,584 (1989 Soviet census).

== History ==
The railway station of Olenya (Оле́нья) was opened in 1916, with the construction of the Murman Railway. The station facilities, and the small settlement associated with the station were located to the east of the railroad. Their importance was somewhat increased in the 1930s, as Olenya became a junction for the railway branch to the newly built town of Monchegorsk some 30 kilometers (19 mi) to the southwest.

In 1949, work started on the iron ore strip mines and ore-processing facilities a few kilometers to the west of the Olenya station. At the same time, construction of a company town, originally also named Olenya, started between the rail station and the mines, to the west of the railway. In December 1949, it was granted work settlement status.

By the March 27, 1957 Decree of the Presidium of the Supreme Soviet of the Russian SFSR, the work settlement of Olenya was granted the status of a town under district jurisdiction, subordinated to Monchegorsk, and given its present name. The railway station, however, retained the name Olenya and was not renamed Olenegorsk until the 1980s. Olenegorsk was elevated in status to that of a town under oblast jurisdiction by the August 10, 1981 Presidium of the Supreme Soviet of the RSFSR Decree, and several inhabited localities previously subordinated to Monchegorsk were transferred to Olenegorsk by the August 26, 1981 Decision of the Murmansk Oblast Executive Committee.

== Administrative and municipal status ==
Within the framework of administrative divisions, it is, together with four rural localities, incorporated as Olenegorsk Town with Jurisdictional Territory—an administrative unit with the status equal to that of the districts. As a municipal division, Olenegorsk Town with Jurisdictional Territory is incorporated as Olenegorsk Urban Okrug. Aside from Olenegorsk itself, the urban okrug includes the rural localities of Imandra, Laplandiya, Vysoky and Yagelny Bor. The settlement of Putevye Usadby 1331 km was abolished in 2009.

== Transportation ==
All passengers trains on the St. Petersburg–Murmansk railway stop at Olenegorsk. The station also serves the nearby town of Monchegorsk, which itself has next to no passenger service, the Olenya airbase (a.k.a. Vysoky), a more remote Sami village of Lovozero, and the mining town of Revda in Lovozersky District.

== Economy ==
The town economy continues to be based on iron ore extraction and processing, mostly shipping enriched ore to Severstal in Cherepovets.

Military bases include the Olenya air base and Olenegorsk Radar Station.

== Notable people ==
- Kate Grigorieva, model
- Liudmila Samsonova, a Russian-Italian tennis player (place of birth)
