= Vysoky, Murmansk Oblast =

Vysoky Высокий
- Inhabited locality
- Interactive map of Vysoky
- Location of Vysoky Vysoky (Murmansk Oblast)
- Coordinates: 68°08′09″N 33°25′09″E
- Country: Russia
- Federal subject: Murmansk Oblast
- Founded: 1953

Population (2010 Census)
  - Total: 6,860
  - Estimate (2002): 8,092 (+18%)
- Time zone: UTC+3 (MSK)
- Postal code: 184538
- Dialing code: +7 81552
- OKTMO ID: 47717000111

Vysoky (Russian: Высокий) is a rural inhabited locality under the administrative jurisdiction of the town of Olenegorsk, Murmansk Oblast, Russia. It is located beyond the Arctic Circle, on the Kola Peninsula.
