= Drozdovka, Murmansk Oblast =

Abolished inhabited locality in Murmansk Oblast, Russia

Drozdovka Дроздовка
- Inhabited locality (abolished)
- Interactive map of Drozdovka
- Location of Drozdovka Drozdovka (Murmansk Oblast)
- Coordinates: 68°20′N 38°26′E
- Country: Russia
- Federal subject: Murmansk Oblast
- Abolished: July 3, 2013
- Elevation: 25 m (82 ft)

Population (2010 Census)
  - Total: 0
  - Estimate (2010): 0 )

Administrative status
  - Subordinated to: Closed Administrative-Territorial Formation of Ostrovnoy

Municipal status
  - Urban okrug: Ostrovnoy Urban Okrug
- Time zone: UTC+3 (MSK)
- Postal code: 184640
- OKTMO ID: 47731000106

Drozdovka (Russian: Дроздо́вка) was a rural locality (an inhabited locality) in administrative jurisdiction of the closed administrative-territorial formation of Ostrovnoy in Murmansk Oblast, Russia, located on the Kola Peninsula beyond the Arctic Circle at the elevation of 1 meter (3 ft 3 in) above sea level.

== History ==
In 1934, the Murmansk Okrug Executive Committee developed a redistricting proposal, which was approved by the Resolution of the 4th Plenary Session of the Murmansk Okrug Committee of the VKP(b) on December 28-29, 1934 and by the Resolution of the Presidium of the Murmansk Okrug Executive Committee on February 2, 1935. On February 15, 1935, the VTsIK approved the redistricting of the okrug into seven districts, although it did not specify what territories the new districts were to include. On February 26, 1935, the Presidium of the Leningrad Oblast Executive Committee worked out the details of the new district scheme and issued a resolution, which, among other things, transferred Drozdovka from Teribersky District to Saamsky District.

Due to depopulation, it was abolished effective July 3, 2013.
