= Khibiny, Murmansk Oblast =

Khibiny Хибины
- Station
- Interactive map of Khibiny
- Location of Khibiny Khibiny (Murmansk Oblast)
- Coordinates: 67°40′32″N 33°12′37″E
- Country: Russia
- Federal subject: Murmansk Oblast
- Administrative district: Apatity
- Elevation: 142 m (466 ft)

Population (2010 Census)
  - Total: 0
  - Estimate (2010): 0 )
- Time zone: UTC+3 (MSK)
- Postal code: 184209
- Dialing code: +7 81555
- OKTMO ID: 47705000111

Khibiny (Russian: Хибины), also known as Khibino (Хибино), is the rural locality (a Station) in Apatity municipality of Murmansk Oblast, Russia. The village is located beyond the Arctic Circle, on the Kola Peninsula. It is 142 m above sea level.

Khibino served as the administrative center of Yekostrovsky Selsoviet of Kolsko-Loparskaya Volost of Alexandrovsky Uyezd of Arkhangelsk Governorate in the Russian SFSR, when the selsoviet's administrative center was moved here from Polovinka by the Resolution of Kolsko-Loparskaya Volost Executive Committee of December 9, 1924.

As of the 2010 census, Khibino is uninhabited.
