= Port-Vladimir =

Abolished settlement in Murmansk Oblast, Russia

Port-Vladimir Порт-Владимир
- Abolished settlement
- The abandoned settlement in July 2024

- Location within Murmansk Oblast
- Coordinates: 69.4151°N 33.1158°E
- Country: Russia
- Region: Murmansk Oblast
- District: Kolsky District
- Renamed Port-Vladimir: 12 November 1885
- Abolished: 2007

Population (1959)
  - Total: 1,718

Port-Vladimir (Russian: Порт-Владимир) was a settlement on Shalim Island in Ura Bay, on the northern coast of the Kola Peninsula in Kolsky District, Murmansk Oblast, Russia. It stood about 15 kilometres north-east of Vidyayevo and could be reached only by water. A whaling station opened in 1883 grew into a fishing village, and later into a closed naval base of the Northern Fleet. The island has had no permanent population since 1994, and the settlement was abolished in 2007.

== History ==
The island's earliest known occupants were Sámi, and the site later became a camp of Pomors known as Yeretiki. In 1883 the industrialist Herman Gebel opened a shore whaling station there. Two years later Grand Duke Vladimir Alexandrovich visited with a group of northern fish merchants. He ordered a church built, and on 12 November 1885 the camp was renamed Port-Vladimir in his honour. The 1905 census counted two dwellings, a bathhouse and four barns.

The settlement grew quickly under Soviet rule. A fish plant opened in 1933, and in 1935 Port-Vladimir was designated a workers' settlement. A Gulag labour camp held prisoners on the island during the 1930s, and they worked at the plant. The population reached 754 by 1938, and a hospital and a school followed in 1940. A hospital of the Northern Fleet was based in the settlement between 1941 and 1944, and Kola Norwegians moved there from Tsypnavolok after the war.

By the 1950s the island had a vegetable store, a bakery, the fish plant, a sawmill and a fishing station. The 1959 census recorded 1,718 residents, and by the early 1960s the population stood at about 2,000. Naval units began arriving in the mid-1960s, because the submarine base at Vidyayevo, 15 kilometres to the south-west, needed cover on every approach. In 1969 the civilian population was moved to the mainland by force, the settlement became a closed naval base, and civilians were barred from the island.

The navy left in 1994 and the buildings have stood empty since.

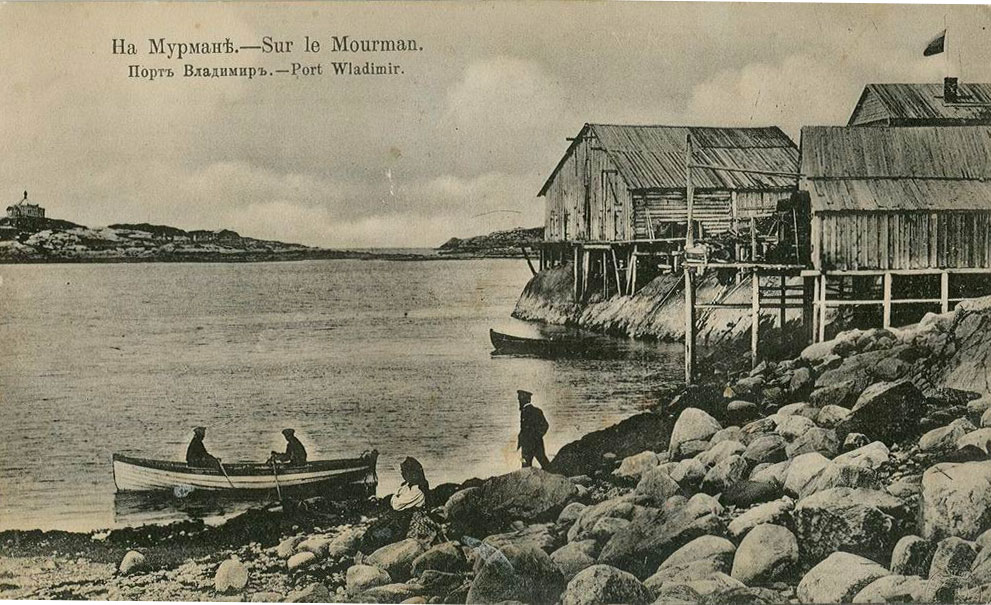
Port-Vladimir on an early 20th-century postcard

Former residents have sailed to the island each year since 2001, and in 2007 a committee of the Murmansk Oblast Duma decided to abolish Port-Vladimir along with four other settlements in the district.
