= Murmansk Okrug =

Murmansk Okrug (Russian: Му́рманский о́круг, Murmansky okrug) was an administrative division (an okrug) of the Russian SFSR, Soviet Union, which existed in 1927–1938.

== Creation ==
The okrug was established on August 1, 1927, when the All-Russian Central Executive Committee (VTsIK) issued two Resolutions: "On the Establishment of Leningrad Oblast" and "On the Borders and Composition of the Okrugs of Leningrad Oblast". According to these resolutions, Murmansk Governorate was transformed into Murmansk Okrug and included into Leningrad Oblast together with eight other okrugs. The okrug was not contiguous with the rest of Leningrad Oblast and was separated from it by the territory of the Karelian Autonomous Soviet Socialist Republic.

Upon the transformation, the administrative structure of the okrug was also changed. Instead of the nine volosts into which Murmansk Governorate was divided, the territory of the okrug was divided into six districts.

== Administrative-territorial changes ==
=== 1926–1929 ===
Just as numerous proposals to change the administrative-territorial structure of Murmansk Governorate, the okrug's predecessor, had been submitted, the work on changing the administrative-territorial structure of the new okrug soon commenced. This time, however, the ethnic composition of the territory became a priority.

Administrative divisions of Murmansk Okrug in 1927
- (Administrative centers are given in parentheses)
- Districts: 1. Alexandrovsky (selo of Alexandrovskoye); 2. Kolsko-Loparsky (selo of Kola); 3. Lovozersky (selo of Lovozero); 4. Ponoysky (selo of Ponoy); 5. Teribersky (selo of Teriberka); 6. Tersky (selo of Kuzomen)

On October 25, 1926, the VTsIK and the Council of People's Commissars adopted a Temporary Provision "On the Governing of the Native Peoples and Tribes of the Extreme North of the RSFSR", which dealt with the peoples and the tribes of the Extreme North who did not have any forms of ethnic government in place. On May 30, 1927, the provision was extended to cover the Lapps (Sami) and the Samoyeds of Murmansk Governorate, allowing them to create special ethnic-based organs of the local self-government. Until 1928, the Sami and Samoyeds used the same forms of government as elsewhere on the Kola Peninsula—the selsoviets and the district executive committees. However, in preparation for the winter 1928–1929 soviet elections, the Murmansk Okrug Executive Committee and the Committee of the North initiated planning to establish ethnic Sami soviets in the ethnic pogosts. On October 11, 1928, the Presidium of the Murmansk Okrug Executive Committee decreed to establish thirteen ethnic Sami soviets:

- in Alexandrovsky District:
  1. Motovsky.
- in Kolsko-Loparsky District:
  1. Babinsky;
  2. Ekostrovsky;
  3. Kildinsky;
  4. Notozersky;
  5. Pulozersky.
- in Lovozersky District:
  1. Kamensky;
  2. Lovozersky;
  3. Semiostrovsky;
  4. Voronezhsky.
- in Ponoysky District:
  1. Iokangsky;
  2. Lumbovsky;
  3. Sosnovsky.

On October 25, 1928, the list was reviewed by the Selsoviet Review Commission of the Organizational Department of Leningrad Oblast Executive Committee. Out of proposed thirteen, they approved the creation of eight:

- in Alexandrovsky District:
  1. Motovsky Selsoviet.
- in Kolsko-Loparsky District:
  1. Babinsky Selsoviet;
  2. Kildinsky Selsoviet;
  3. Notozersky Selsoviet;
- in Lovozersky District:
  1. Semiostrovsky Selsoviet;
  2. Voronezhsky Selsoviet.
- in Ponoysky District:
  1. Iokangsky Selsoviet;
  2. Sosnovsky Selsoviet.

In addition to these eight, Peyvo-Yarvinsky Selsoviet of Kolsko-Loparsky District was granted the status of the national Finnish selsoviet. The creation of the other proposed ethnic Sami selsoviets was found to be impractical.

The creation of the new selsoviets was finally approved by the Resolution of the Presidium of the VTsIK of December 10, 1928, and seven ethnic Sami selsoviets were established in Murmansk Okrug in the beginning of 1929. The only exception was Babinsky Selsoviet, the creation of which did not succeed. Unlike elsewhere in the Russian SFSR, the new selsoviets were not clannish in nature, as the Sami people did not have clans, but rather territorially defined, which meant that their structure was identical to the structure of regular selsoviets, with the only exception of having the rights granted to them by the VTsIK's Temporary Provision.

On August 13, 1929, in the context of creation of the national okrugs and districts across the Extreme North territories, Murmansk Committee of the North submitted a project to the Presidium of the Okrug Executive Committee, which suggested the creation of an ethnic district on the territory of Ponoysky District and part of the territory of Lovozersky District, the population of which was predominantly Sami. On September 16, 1929, the project was discussed at the session of the Murmansk Okrug Planning Commission, which found the creation of such a district feasible and suggested in turn two possible scenarios of establishing an ethnic district. The first scenario suggested the creation of the district on the territories of Ponoysky and Lovozersky Districts, with Ponoysky Selsoviet being left out. The second one suggested the creation of the district on parts of the territories of Ponoysky and Lovozersky Districts, namely in Iokangsky, Kamensky, Lumbovsky, Semiostrovsky, and Sosnovsky pogosts. At the same time, the creation of another ethnic Sami district to the west was suggested.

On October 25–26, 1929, the joint session of the Murmansk Okrug Executive Committee and the Murmansk City Council reviewed the Committee of the North report and found it feasible to establish two ethnic Sami districts:

- Vostochno-Laplandsky District, which would be created by merging the territories and the populations of Lovozersky and Ponoysky Districts, as well as the territory of the summer-time Semiostrovsky pogost of Teribersky District.
- Zapadno-Laplandsky District, on the territories of Kolsko-Loparsky District where the Sami population was predominant.

On December 25, 1929, this project was amended and approved by the Administrative-Legislative Commission of the Committee of the North. Vostochno-Laplandsky District was approved as proposed, with the exception of the village of Ponoy, which would be incorporated into a separate selsoviet with its own budget as its population was predominantly Russian. Zapadno-Laplandsky District was to include the following selsoviets and settlements: Kildinsky, Notozersky (with the Finnish village of Nivankyulya), Babinsky (with the Finnish village of Iona but without the Russian settlement of Zasheyek); the territories of the Sami people: Girvasky, Pulozersky, and Yekotrovsky. Sami in Motovsky Selsoviet would remain in Alexandrovsky District.

=== 1930 ===
On January 10, 1930 the Presidium of the VTsIK issued a circular letter on the procedures for establishing special ethnic administrative-territorial units (okrugs, districts, and selsoviets) for the ethnic minorities. Based on this letter, on January 25, 1930 the Presidium of the Leningrad Oblast Executive Committee ordered the Murmansk Okrug Executive Committee to start working on granting the ethnic status to the selsoviets in which at least two-thirds of the population were ethnic minorities. By April 1, 1930, seven ethnic Finnish selsoviets and one ethnic Norwegian selsoviet were established in Murmansk Okrug, in addition to seven already existing Sami selsoviets. Discussions of the possibilities of establishing more ethnic selsoviets was ongoing in the executive committees of various levels.

On May 4, 1930, the Okrug Administrative Commission approved the list of the ethnic selsoviets:

- Finnish selsoviets
  - in Alexandrovsky District: Belokamensky, Gryazno-Gubsky, Ozerkovsky, Tyuva-Gubsky, Ura-Gubsky, Zapadno-Litsky
  - in Kolsko-Loparsky District: Peyvo-Yarvinsky
- Norwegian selsoviets
  - in Alexandrovsky District: Tsyp-Navoloksky
- Sami selsoviets
  - in Alexandrovsky District: Motovsky
  - in Kolsko-Loparsky District: Kildinsky, Notozersky
  - in Lovozersky District: Semiostrovsky, Voronezhsky
  - in Ponoysky District: Iokangsky, Lumbovsky

This list was approved on May 7, 1930 by the Presidium of the Murmansk Okrug Executive Committee.

With the task of creating ethnic selsoviets completed, on May 26, 1930 the okrug administrative commission returned to the discussion of the previously proposed ethnic districts. The possibility of creation of Vostochno-Laplandsky District was reviewed—the new district was to include the territory of Lovozersky District, a territory in the east of Teribersky District, and the territories of Iokangsky and Lumbovsky Sami Selsoviets of Ponoysky District. Ponoysky and Sosnovsky Selsoviets of Ponoysky District would be merged into Tersky District. This proposal was approved and sent on for further consideration to the administrative commission of the Leningrad Oblast Executive Committee. The proposal for creation of Zapadno-Laplandsky District, on the other hand, was declined and returned to the Committee of the North as needing a revision. The discussion of the possibility of creating an ethnic Finnish district was postponed.

The administrative commission of the Leningrad Oblast Executive Committee reviewed the proposal on July 31, 1930. Its decision, which was later confirmed by the Presidium of the Leningrad Oblast Executive Committee on January 7, 1931, was unexpected—instead of creating the proposed districts, the commission granted ethnic status to existing Lovozersky District, with Voronezhsky and Semiostrovsky Selsoviets designated as "ethnic", and Ivanovsky and Lovozersky Selsoviets—as "ethnic Zyryan". Alexandrovsky District within its existing borders was granted the status of an ethnic Finnish district; same status was confirmed for six of the district's selsoviets (Belokamensky, Gryazno-Gubsky, Ozerkovsky, Tyuva-Gubsky, Ura-Gubsky, and Zapadno-Litsky). Tsyp-Navoloksky Selsoviet was granted the status of an ethnic Norwegian selsoviet, Motovsky Selsoviet—the generic "ethnic" status, and Alexandrovsky and Titovsky Selsoviet retained their "regular" status. In Kolsko-Loparsky District, Peyvo-Yarvinsky Selsoviet was granted ethnic Finnish status. Kildinsky and Notozersky Selsoviets of Kolsko-Loparsky District, as well as Iokangsky and Lumbovsky Selsoviets of Ponoysky District, were classified as "ethnic" as well. The names of all selsoviets and their administrative centers remained unchanged.

This decision left the government of Murmansk Oblast unhappy. The meeting of the Murmansk Okrug Planning Commission on October 31, 1930 noted that granting Lovozersky District an ethnic status is mostly meaningless as the population of the district in its existing borders is composed mostly of the Zyryans, not of the Sami. The Planning Commission petitioned the Leningrad Oblast Executive Committee to review its decision and to establish Vostochno-Laplandsky District as previously suggested—something the Leningrad Oblast Executive Commission ultimately never did.

=== 1931–1936 ===
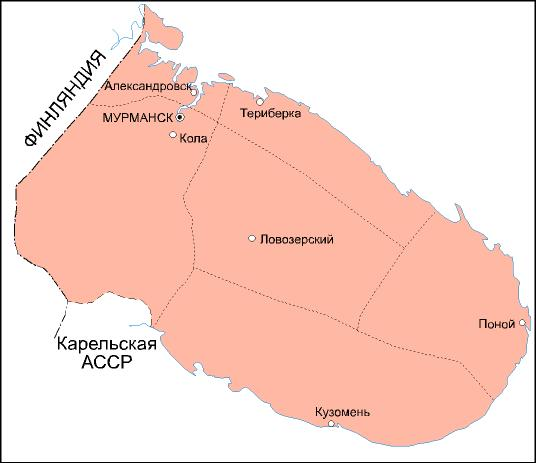
Map of Murmansk Okrug in 1931

The work on the organization of the ethnic Sami districts resumed in fall 1931. Even though Lovozersky District had already been designated as ethnic Sami, the 8th Plenary Session of the Committee of the North started another initiative to create an ethnic Sami district on the territory of Murmansk Okrug. First such proposal was presented on October 8, 1931 in Leningrad by the government of the Sami association. The proposal suggested the creation of two ethnic districts: Zapadno-Saamsky and Vostochno-Saamsky. Zapadno-Saamsky District would include the western part of Polyarny District (excluding the Rybachy Peninsula), most of Kolsko-Loparsky District (with the exception of Khibiny and the territory in the immediate vicinity of the Kola Bay), the northwestern part of Lovozersky District, and the southwestern part of Teribersky District, which would cover two-thirds of the Sami population of the okrug. The administrative center of the district would be in Kola, but would later be moved to Murmashi. Vostochno-Saamsky District would include most of Ponoysky District, the southeastern part of Teribersky District, and the eastern part of Lovozersky District, which would cover a quarter of the Sami population of the okrug. The administrative center of this district would be in Iokanga.

The proposal was considered by the commission on the matters of administrative division of the Murmansk Okrug Executive Committee in May 1932. The commission agreed that Vostochno-Saamsky District would need to be created, but it should be created as a merger of Ponoysky and Lovozersky Districts, which would cover 39% of the Sami population. The commission also suggested that the administrative center of this new district should be in Lovozero. The creation of Zapadno-Saamsky District was not recommended due to the fact that only 8.8% of the Sami people lived in the western parts of the okrug. Additionally, the commission took into consideration the rapid growth of mining industry in the Khibiny Massif and the planned expansion to the areas surrounding Lake Imandra, and recommended to create a district with mining specialization on the part of the territory of Kolsko-Loparsky District (Kukisvumchorrsky Settlement Council, Ekostrovsky Selsoviet, and the settlements of Apatity and Zasheyek), with the administrative center in Khibinogorsk.

The Murmansk Okrug Executive Committee held several additional meetings in summer 1932. As a result, the redistricting proposal was amended further. During the June 25, 1932 meeting, the creation of Zapadno-Saamsky District was discussed again and found to be feasible. Tersky, Teribersky, and Polarny Districts would remain unchanged. During the meetings held on July 7 and 25, 1932, the new districts' composition details were further refined. Finally, the meeting of October 3, 1932 issued the final recommendations. The proposed redistricting scheme was taking into consideration not only the ethnic aspect, but the economic realities as well. The commission found it necessary to create seven districts within the okrug:

1. Khibinsky District, with mining specialization (with the administrative center in Khibinogorsk), which would be created on the territories near the Khibiny Massif where apatite was actively being mined, including Lovozersky Selsoviet of Lovozersky District, the northeastern part of Tersky District, as well as Ekostrovsky Selsoviet and most of Iono-Babinsky Selsoviet of Kolsko-Loparsky District.
2. Polyarny District, with ethnic Finnish status (with the administrative center in Polyarnoye), which would include Minkinsky Selsoviet of Kolsko-Loparsky District. 42% of the district population would be Finnish.
3. Teribersky District (with the administrative center in Teriberka) would lose its eastern part, which was to be transferred to Vostochno-Saamsky District, but would gain Voronezhsky Selsoviet of Lovozersky District.
4. Tersky District (with the administrative center in Tetrino) would become smaller, with the new Umbsky District being formed from its western parts. The district's specialization would be fishing.
5. Umbsky District (with the administrative center in Umba) would be formed from the western parts of Tersky District (the work settlement of Lesnoy with a timber-cutting plant, as well as Kuzreksky, Olenitsky, Porya-Gubsky, and Umbsky Selsoviets) and specialize in timber industry.
6. Vostochno-Saamsky District, with ethnic Sami status (with the administrative center in Iokanga), which would include Ponoysky District, the eastern portion of Teribersky District, and Ivanovsky and Semiostrovsky Selsoviets of Lovozersky District. The population of the new district would be 38% Sami, 5% Samoyedic, 18% Izhem, and 39% Russian.
7. Zapadno-Saamsky with ethnic Sami status (with the administrative center in Kola), which would include Kildinsky, Kolsky, Notozersky, Peyvo-Yarvinsky, and Pulozersky Selsoviets of Kolsko-Loparsky District, as well as Girvasky territory of the Sami people, to be split from Iono-Babinsky Selsoviet. All in all, the Sami would comprise 18% of the total district population.

On March 14, 1934, during the meeting of the organizational department of the Murmansk Okrug Executive Committee, the above proposal was reviewed, and the recommendation was made to establish eight instead of seven districts:

1. Kandalakshsky District (with the administrative center in Kandalaksha), formed from the northern portion of Kandalakshsky District of the Karelian ASSR and the western part of Tersky District
2. Khibinogorsky District, with mining specialization (with the administrative center in Khibinogorsk).
3. Kuzomensky District (with the administrative center in Kuzomen), formed on the eastern part of the territory of Tersky District.
4. Lovozersky District (with the administrative center in Lovozero), including Kildinsky Selsoviet of Kolsko-Loparsky District in addition to existing Voronezhsky and Lovozersky Selsoviets.
5. Polyarny District, with the ethnic Finnish status (with the administrative center in Polyarnoye).
6. Teribersky District (with the administrative center in Teriberka).
7. Vostochny District, with the ethnic Sami status (with the administrative center in Iokanga).
8. Zapadny District, with the ethnic Sami status (with the administrative center in Murmashi).

The inclusion of the Karelian territory into Kandalakshsky District was intended to resolve the border issue with Karelia, which remained unresolved since 1923. The forest district supplying the timber industry in Murmansk Okrug spanned the territories of both the Karelian ASSR and the okrug, which created economic inconveniences. Furthermore, a chemical plant in Kandalaksha, being under construction at the time, was ultimately to use the apatite mined in the Khibiny Massif, which again was inconvenient from the economic point of view.

Despite all the work on granting ethnic status to various divisions, the concept did not take hold and starting from the mid-1930s all references to ethnic status of the districts and selsoviets disappeared from the official documents.

On April 28, 1934, the Murmansk Okrug Executive Committee meeting considered the redistricting proposal and discussed the inclusion of various inhabited localities into the new districts. The redistricting commission of the Murmansk Okrug Executive Committee, which met on June 5, 1934, no longer considered the inclusion of Kandalakshsky District into Murmansk Okrug, and additionally proposed to divide the existing Tersky District into new Kuzomensky and Umbsky District, using the border line previously proposed for Kandalakshsky and Kuzomensky Districts.

By the end of 1934, the Murmansk Okrug Executive Committee developed another redistricting proposal, which was approved by the Resolution of the 4th Plenary Session of the Murmansk Okrug Committee of the VKP(b) on December 28–29, 1934 and by the Resolution of the Presidium of the Murmansk Okrug Executive Committee on February 2, 1935. According to this proposal, the borders of Lovozersky, Polarny, and Teribersky Districts were to be changed. Ponoysky District was to be abolished and new Saamsky District (with ethnic Sami status) to be established in its place. Kolsko-Loparsky District was also to be abolished, with Kirovsky and Kolsky Districts to be established in its place. Tersky District would remain unchanged. The final proposal looked as follows:

1. Districts specializing in fishing:
  1. Polyarny;
  2. Teribersky.
2. Districts specializing in deer herding:
  1. Lovozersky;
  2. Saamsky.
3. Districts specializing in mining:
  1. Kirovsky;
  2. Kolsky.
4. District with mixed specialization (fishing and timber industry):
  1. Tersky.

Additionally, the proposal called for the enlargement of Murmansk, into which small nearby settlements were to be merged and for the establishment of a settlement council in Kola (which would be subordinated directly to Murmansk). The proposal was approved and sent up for further approval to the Leningrad Oblast Executive Committee. On February 15, 1935, the VTsIK approved the redistricting of the okrug into seven districts: Kirovsky, Kolsko-Loparsky, Lovozersky, Polyarny, Ponoysky, Teribersky, and Tersky. On February 26, 1935, the Presidium of the Leningrad Oblast Executive Committee worked out the details of the new district scheme and issued a resolution, which established the seven districts and additionally requested Ponoysky District to be renamed Saamsky and Kolsko-Loparsky District to be renamed Kolsky. Both renamings were approved by the Resolution of the Presidium of the VTsIK on June 1, 1936.

Administrative divisions of Murmansk Okrug in 1936
- (Administrative centers are given in parentheses)
- Districts: 1. Kirovsky (town of Kirovsk); 2. Kolsky (selo of Kola); 3. Lovozersky (selo of Lovozero); 4. Polyarny (town of Murmansk); 5. Saamsky (selo of Iokanga); 6. Teribersky (stanovishche of Teriberka); 7. Tersky (work settlement of Lesnoy)

=== 1937–1938 ===
By 1937, the copper-nickel mining volume in the Monchegorsk area increased significantly, and, consequently, the area population grew as well. On February 19, 1937 the Presidium of the Murmansk Okrug Executive Committee petitioned to create new Monchegorsky District by separating the town and its surrounding area from Kirovsky District and to grant Monchegorsk town status. While town status was granted to Monchegorsk by the VTsIK Resolution of September 20, 1937, no new district was formed.

On December 21, 1937, the Presidium of the Murmansk Okrug Executive Committee again petitioned to create a new district with the administrative center in Monchegorsk. In a letter to the Leningrad Oblast Executive Committee and the VTsIK, the Presidium noted that Kirovsky District has two developed but unrelated industrial centers—Kirovsk and Monchegorsk—with the latter having a larger population and being located 111 kilometers (69 mi) away from the former.

On February 10, 1938, the VTsIK adopted a Resolution changing the administrative-territorial structure of Murmansk Okrug; however, new Monchegorsky District was not created and Monchegorsk remained a part of Kirovsky District.

Administrative divisions of Murmansk Okrug in 1938
- Cities and towns: 1. Murmansk (okrug administrative center)
- Districts: 1. Kirovsky; 2. Kolsky; 3. Lovozersky; 4. Polyarny; 5. Saamsky; 6. Teribersky; 7. Tersky

== Karelian border issue ==
The issue with the southern border with the Karelian ASSR had not been resolved by the time the okrug was established in 1927. This unresolved problem was one of the reasons for the proposals to include the whole Kandalakshskaya Volost (which later became Kandalakshsky District) into the territory of the okrug. The okrug authorities argued that at the very least the pre-1923 borders need to be recognized, while the Karelian side was insisting that the border shown on the official NKVD map was to be retained. On February 10, 1931, the Presidium of the VTsIK reviewed the matter and ruled to leave Murmansk Okrug "within existing borders". However, during the April 12, 1931 meeting of the representatives of Murmansk Okrug and the Karelian ASSR it turned out that each side has a different understanding of what the "existing borders" are supposed to be. The Murmansk Okrug representative declared that the VTsIK resolution refers to the southern border of former Alexandrovsky Uyezd, which was transformed into Murmansk Governorate in June 1931, while the Karelian representative was convinced that the resolution gives official status to the border shown on the official NKVD map of the Karelian ASSR.

The Presidium of the Murmansk Okrug Executive Committee issued two resolutions—one on April 13, 1931 and another on July 23, 1932—explaining its position and petitioned several times to review the borders once again, but the administrative commission of the Leningrad Oblast Executive Committee in its letter of October 11, 1932 declared that there will be no further review of the border situation.

The problem re-surfaced in 1935, when by the VTsIK Resolution of August 20, work settlement status was granted to the settlement of Zasheyek in Kirovsky District. After the resolution had been published, it was pointed out that Zasheyek is simultaneously listed in Kirovsky District of Murmansk Okrug and in the Karelian ASSR. The joint meeting of the representatives of Murmansk Okrug and Karelia, which took place on April 15, 1936, was unable to resolve the situation.

On June 8, 1936, the Presidium of the Karelian ASSR Central Executive Committee approved the transfer of the station of Zasheyek of the Kirov Railway and of the settlement of Verkhny Nivastroy (also known as Zasheyek) from Kandalakshsky District of the Karelian ASSR to Murmansk Okrug; the border would still remain unchanged. The Resolution of the Presidium of the Karelian ASSR Central Executive Committee of August 8, 1936 also added to this list the settlement of Zasheykovskogo lesopilnogo zavoda and the settlement of Zasheyek proper. The Presidium of the VTsIK approved the petition for transfer of the work settlement of Zasheyek on April 1, 1937; however, the VTsIK did not list all of the inhabited localities being transferred by name, which lead to the continuation of the dispute between Murmansk Okrug and the Karelian ASSR. When a transfer act for the work settlement of Zasheyek was being compiled on May 5, 1937, the Murmansk Okrug representatives demanded that the settlements of Lesozavoda, lesouchastka Vostochnaya Guba, and Verkhny Nivastroy, as well as the station of Zasheyek of the Kirov Railway, were also transferred to Murmansk Okrug. The Karelian representatives insisted that these settlements are to remain in the Karelian ASSR. The conciliatory commission meeting on July 8, 1937 failed to resolve this dispute. On July 15, 1937, the Presidium of the Murmansk Okrug Executive Committee called the problem "artificial" and declared that the transfer should not have even been discussed, since the inhabited locality in question was never officially transferred out of the okrug and was being served solely by the Murmansk Okrug organizations anyway. Furthermore, the Presidium refused to approve the conciliatory commission's findings and petitioned to rescind the VTsIK's resolution of April 1, 1937 and to officially document the border between Murmansk Okrug and the Karelian ASSR.

The issue had never been officially resolved until 1938, when the transformation of Murmansk Okrug into Murmansk Oblast with the subsequent transfer of Kandalakshsky District to the oblast rendered the problem moot.

== Urbanization ==
First work settlements appeared in Murmansk Okrug in 1930. One of the first two settlements was Kukisvumchorr, which was established as an apatite-mining settlement near the mountain of the same name in the Khibiny Massif in the south of Kolsko-Loparsky District, and was granted the work settlement status by the VTsIK Resolution of July 20, 1930. Another one was a nameless settlement, ultimately called Lesnoy, serving a timber-cutting plant in Tersky District.

The number of work settlements increased in summer 1935. Kola, which was demoted to a rural locality in 1926, was elevated in status to an urban locality and granted work settlement status by the VTsIK Resolution of August 20, 1935. By the same resolution, work settlement status was also granted to Port-Vladimir in Polyarny District, and to Apatity and Zasheyek in Kirovsky District.

== Abolition ==
The okrug existed until May 28, 1938, when it was separated from Leningrad Oblast, merged with Kandalakshsky District of the Karelian ASSR, and transformed into Murmansk Oblast.
