= Lake Chudzyavr =

Lake in Murmansk, Russia

Lake Chudzjavr
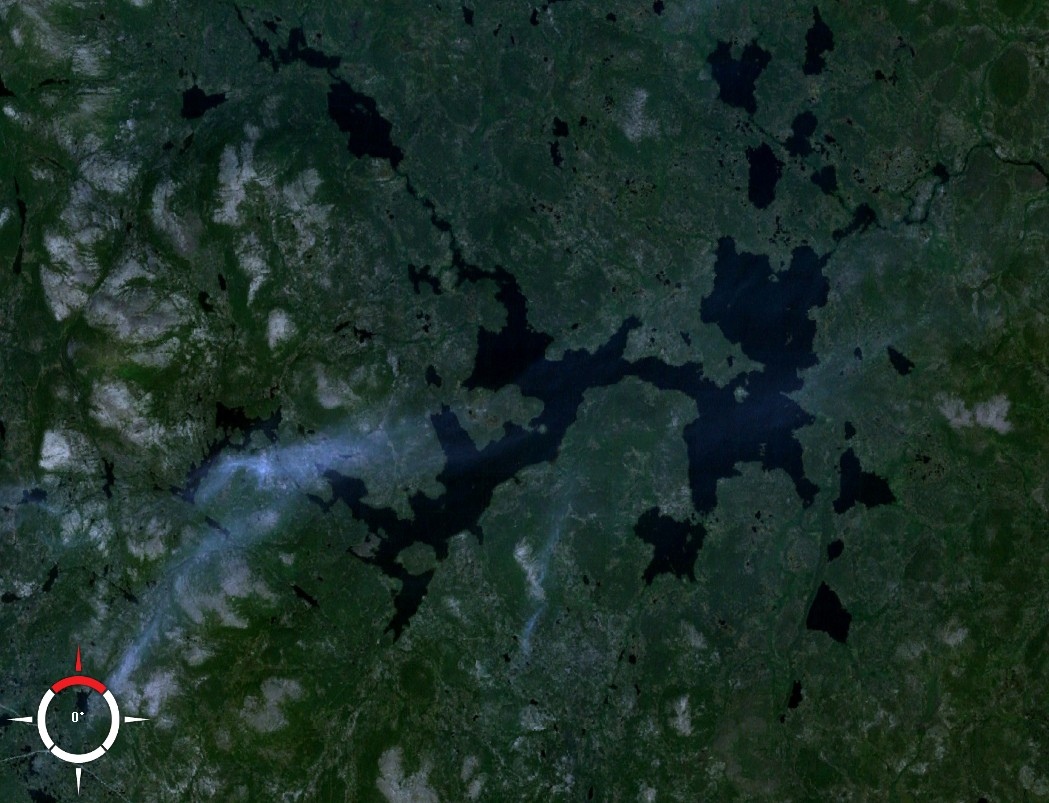
- from space

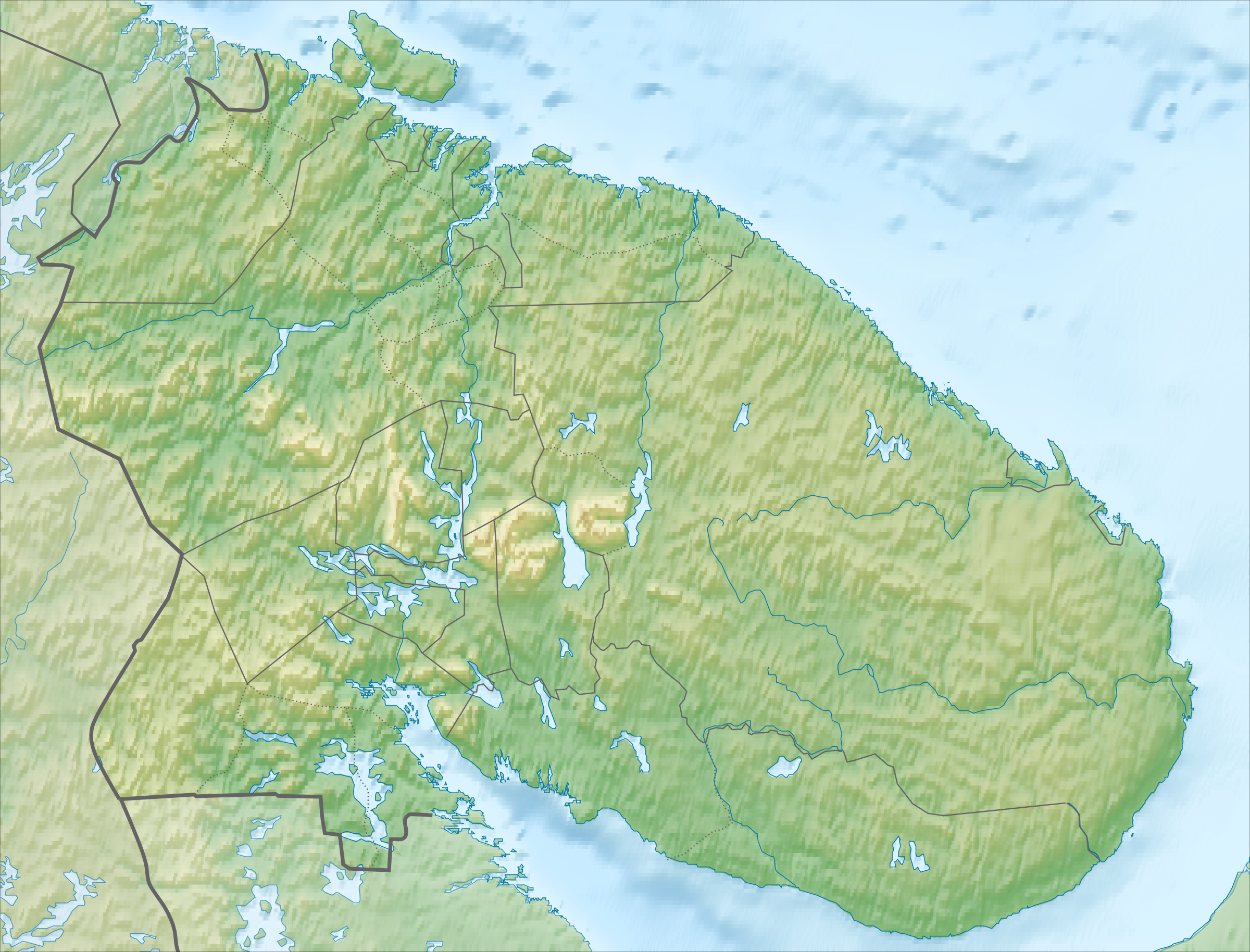
- Location within Murmansk Oblast Location within Russia
- Location: Kola Peninsula, Murmansk Oblast
- Coordinates: 68°12′N 34°37′E
- Primary outflows: Chudzyok
- Basin countries: Russia
- Surface area: 57.8 km^{2} (22.3 sq mi)
- Surface elevation: 192 m (630 ft)

Lake Chudzyavr (Russian: Чудзъявр) is a large freshwater lake on the Kola Peninsula in Murmansk Oblast, Russia. It has an area of 57.8 square kilometers (22.3 sq mi). The river Chudzyok (left tributary of the Voronya) flows from the lake.

The name of the lake is of Kildin Sami origin.
