= Leninsky Administrative Okrug, Murmansk =

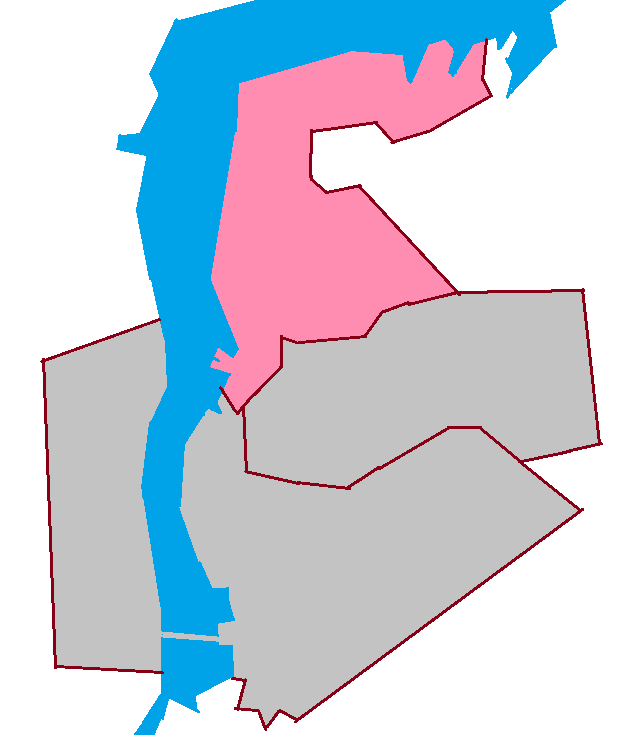

Leninsky Administrative Okrug (Russian: Ле́нинский администрати́вный о́круг) is an okrug (territorial division) of the City of Murmansk in Murmansk Oblast, Russia. Population: 90,331 (2010 census); 97,755 (2002 census); 147,235 (1989 Soviet census).

== History ==
It was established for the first time by the Decree of the Presidium of the Supreme Soviet of the Russian SFSR of April 20, 1939 and abolished together with the other two city districts on June 2, 1948. All three city districts, including Leninsky, were restored on June 23, 1951, but on September 30, 1958 were again abolished. On June 10, 1957, two city districts were created in Murmansk, including Leninsky District. When the Charter of the Hero City of Murmansk was adopted on December 17, 1995, all city districts started to be referred to as administrative okrugs.
