= Polyarny District =

Polyarny District (Russian: Поля́рный райо́н) was an administrative division (a district) of Murmansk Okrug of Leningrad Oblast of the Russian SFSR, Soviet Union, and later of Murmansk Oblast, which existed in 1927–1960.

It was established as Alexandrovsky District on August 1, 1927, when the All-Russian Central Executive Committee (VTsIK) issued two Resolutions: "On the Establishment of Leningrad Oblast" and "On the Borders and Composition of the Okrugs of Leningrad Oblast". According to these resolutions, Murmansk Governorate was transformed into Murmansk Okrug, which was divided into six districts (Alexandrovsky being one of them) and included into Leningrad Oblast. The administrative center of the district was in the selo of Alexandrovskoye (Polyarnoye), and later in Murmansk. Upon establishment, Alexandrovsky, Belokamensky, Gryazno-Gubsky, Toros-Ostrovsky, Tyuva-Gubsky, and Ura-Gubsky Selsoviets of the former Alexandrovskaya Volost were included into the district.

On July 31, 1930, the administrative commission of the Leningrad Executive Committee granted the district the status of a Finnish national district. The Presidium of the Leningrad Oblast Executive Committee confirmed this decision on January 7, 1931.

On November 20, 1930, the Presidium of the VTsIK issued a resolution prescribing to rename those districts of the Russian SFSR which share a name with another district. Consequently, in December 1930, Leningrad Oblast Executive Committee asked the Alexandrovsky District Executive Committee to come up with a new name for the district; one which would be representative of local geographical and ethnic conditions. On January 12, 1931, the Third Congress of the Soviets of Alexandrovsky District issued a resolution, renaming the district "Polyarny"; the village of Alexandrovskoye was renamed Polyarnoye. The new name, which literally means "polar", was explained by the fact that of all the districts of Leningrad Oblast, Polyarny is the closest to the North Pole and experiences polar nights in winter. On March 5, 1931 the new name was approved by the administrative commission of the Leningrad Oblast Executive Committee, and on March 11, 1931—by its Presidium.

Due to ongoing military construction in Polyarnoye, the Presidium of the District Executive Committee passed a Resolution on December 8, 1934 to move the administrative center of the district from Polyarnoye to Murmansk. The move was completed by the beginning of 1935.

Also in 1934, the Murmansk Okrug Executive Committee developed a redistricting proposal, which was approved by the Resolution of the 4th Plenary Session of the Murmansk Okrug Committee of the VKP(b) on December 28-29, 1934 and by the Resolution of the Presidium of the Murmansk Okrug Executive Committee on February 2, 1935. On February 15, 1935, the VTsIK approved the redistricting of the okrug into seven districts, but did not specify what territories the new districts were to include. On February 26, 1935, the Presidium of the Leningrad Oblast Executive Committee worked out the details of the new district scheme and issued a resolution, which transferred Minkinsky Selsoviet of former Kolsko-Loparsky District to Polyarny District. At the same time, the administrative center of Polyarny District was moved from Polyarnoye to Sayda-Guba. The provisions of the February 26, 1935 Resolution, however, were not fully implemented. Due to military construction in Polyarnoye, the administrative center was instead moved to Murmansk in the beginning of 1935 and remained there until September 11, 1938, when by the Decree of the Presidium of the Supreme Soviet of the Russian SFSR the administrative center was moved to Ura-Guba.

After the Winter War of 1939–1940, the western parts of the Rybachy and Sredny Peninsulas were ceded by Finland to the Soviet Union by the Moscow Peace Treaty. By the July 13, 1940 Decision of the Murmansk Oblast Executive Committee, these territories were appended to Polyarny District.

The inhabited locality of Abram-Mys was transferred from Polyarny District to the administrative jurisdiction of Murmansk City Soviet by the Decree of the Presidium of the Supreme Soviet of the Russian SFSR of January 3, 1950.

On April 18, 1951, the work settlement of Vayenga was elevated in status to that of a town under oblast jurisdiction and renamed Severomorsk. On April 26, 1951, by the Decision of Murmansk Oblast Executive Committee, several inhabited localities of Polyarny District were passed into its jurisdiction.

By the June 14, 1956 Decree of the Presidium of the Supreme Soviet of the RSFSR, the town of Polyarny was demoted in status to that of a town under district jurisdiction and subordinated to Polyarny District.

The district was abolished by the Decree of the Presidium of the Supreme Soviet of the RSFSR of July 9, 1960. The district's territory was divided between Kolsky, Pechengsky, and Teribersky Districts, with the town of Polyarny being administratively subordinated to the town of Severomorsk.

== See also ==
- Murmansk Finns
