= Kirovsk, Murmansk Oblast =

Town in Murmansk Oblast, Russia

Kirovsk Кировск
- Town
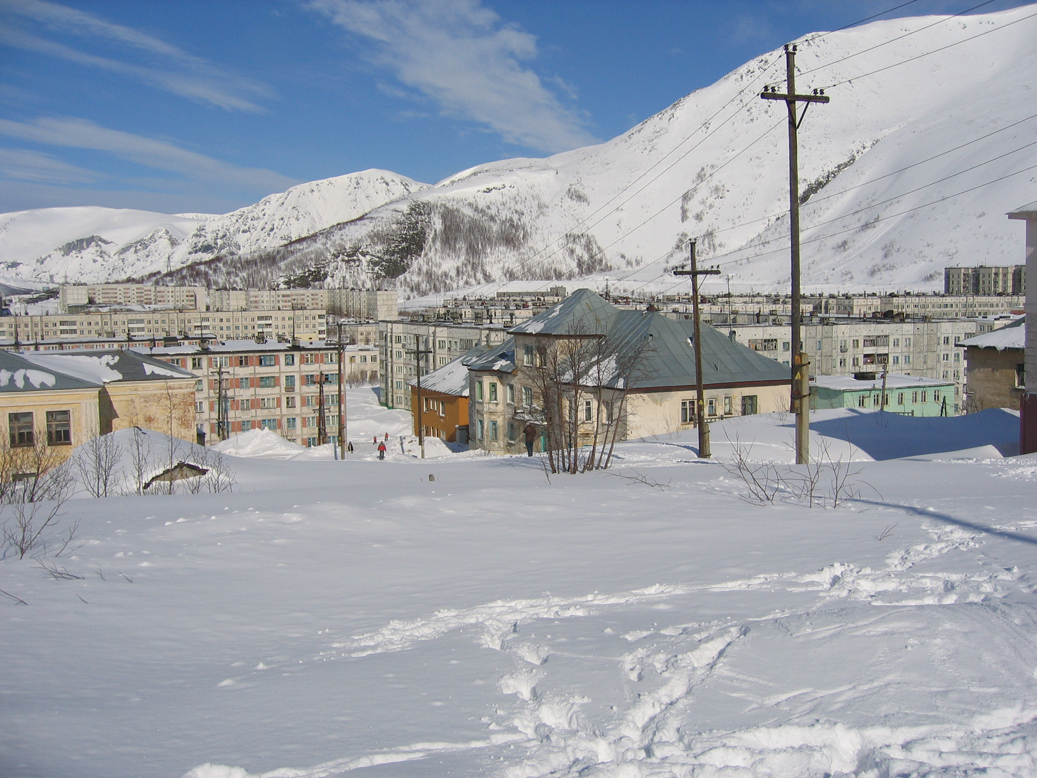
- View of Kirovsk

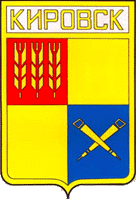
- Coat of arms
- Interactive map of Kirovsk
- Location of Kirovsk Kirovsk (Murmansk Oblast)
- Coordinates: 67°37′N 33°39′E
- Country: Russia
- Federal subject: Murmansk Oblast
- Founded: 1929
- Town status since: October 30, 1931
- Elevation: 380 m (1,250 ft)

Population (2010 Census)
  - Total: 28,625
  - Estimate (2023): 24,271 (−15.2%)

Administrative status
  - Subordinated to: Kirovsk Town with Jurisdictional Territory
  - Capital of: Kirovsk Town with Jurisdictional Territory

Municipal status
  - Urban okrug: Kirovsk Urban Okrug
  - Capital of: Kirovsk Urban Okrug
- Time zone: UTC+3 (MSK)
- Postal code: 184250
- Dialing code: +7 81531
- OKTMO ID: 47712000001
- Website: kirovsk.ru

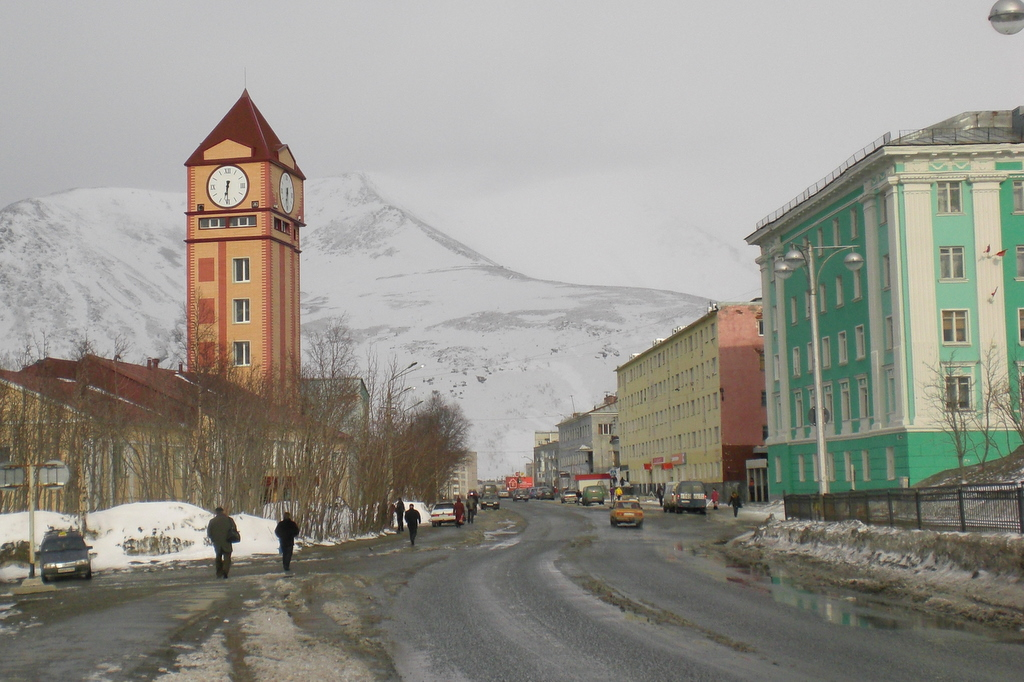
Central Kirovsk

Kirovsk (Russian: Ки́ровск), known as Khibinogorsk (Хибиного́рск) until 1934, is a town in Murmansk Oblast, Russia, located at the spurs of the Khibiny Mountains on the shores of the Lake Bolshoy Vudyavr, 175 kilometers (109 mi) south of Murmansk. Population: 28,625 (2010 census).

Historical population
Year	Pop.	±%
1939	22,542	—
1959	39,047	+73.2%
1970	38,484	−1.4%
1979	40,521	+5.3%
1989	43,526	+7.4%
2002	31,593	−27.4%
2010	28,625	−9.4%
2021	24,857	−13.2%
Population size may be affected by changes in administrative divisions. Source: Censuses

== History ==
A settlement which eventually became Kirovsk was founded in 1929, soon after an expedition led by Alexander Fersman had discovered large deposits of apatite and nepheline in the Khibiny Massif in the 1920s. By the end of 1930, its population grew to ten thousand people, and a mining and chemical plant here was well under construction.

The new urban settlement was largely populated by forced settlers, dekulakised peasants from other parts of the country. Death rates in the 1930s were high and they were buried next to the highway in what became the town cemetery. A stone monument was erected there in 2005.

Due to the rapid growth, the Presidium of the Murmansk Okrug Executive Committee petitioned on January 18, 1931 to grant the settlement town status and to name it Khibinogorsk. The petition was approved by the All-Russian Central Executive Committee Resolution on October 30, 1931 and the town was subordinated directly to the Murmansk Okrug Executive Committee. On December 15, 1934, the town was renamed Kirovsk after recently assassinated Sergey Kirov, who had been in charge of planning the development of the deposits.

On February 26, 1935, when new Kirovsky District was established on part of the territory of Kolsko-Loparsky District, Kirovsk was transferred to it and made its administrative center. On May 6, 1954, by the Decree of the Presidium of the Supreme Soviet of the Soviet Union, Kirovsk was elevated in status to that of a town under oblast jurisdiction. Kirovsky District was abolished, and its territory was subordinated to Kirovsk.

By the September 20, 1965 Presidium of the Supreme Soviet of the Russian SFSR Decree, the work settlement of Kovdor located on the territory under Kirovsk's jurisdiction was granted town under district jurisdiction status and subordinated to Kirovsk Town Soviet. On January 6, 1966, the Murmansk Oblast Executive Committee petitioned to transform the work settlement of Molodyozhny located on the territory under Kirovsk's jurisdiction into a town under oblast jurisdiction called Khibinogorsk and on subordinating a part of the territory in Kirovsk's jurisdiction to it. The petition was reviewed by the Presidium of the Supreme Soviet of the Russian SFSR, which, however, decreed on July 7, 1966 to merge the work settlements of Molodyozhny and Apatity into a town under oblast jurisdiction, which would retain the name Apatity. Consequently, the Murmansk Oblast Executive Committee subordinated a part of the territory under Kirovsk's jurisdiction to the new town by the decision of October 13, 1966.

== Administrative and municipal status ==
Within the framework of administrative divisions, it is, together with two rural localities, incorporated as Kirovsk Town with Jurisdictional Territory—an administrative unit with the status equal to that of the districts. As a municipal division, Kirovsk Town with Jurisdictional Territory is incorporated as Kirovsk Urban Okrug.

== Miscellaneous ==
The northernmost botanical garden in Russia is located in Kirovsk.

== Tourism ==
Kirovsk is the northernmost mountained ski area in Europe. There are two major ski resorts in the town: Bigwood and Kukisvumchorr with nearly 50 km of slopes operating from November to June. The tourism industry is developing rapidly with new hotels and ski lifts opening every year.

== International relations ==
=== Twin towns and sister cities ===
Kirovsk is twinned with:

- Alpine Meadow, Lake Tahoe, United States
- Gällivare Municipality, Sweden
- Harstad, Norway
- Tornio, Finland
- Newry, United Kingdom
