= Drozdovka, Vladimir Oblast =

Drozdovka Дроздовка
- Village
- Location within Vladimir Oblast Location within Russia
- Coordinates: 56°12′N 41°06′E
- Country: Russia
- Region: Vladimir Oblast
- District: Kovrovsky District
- Time zone: UTC+3:00

Drozdovka (Russian: Дроздовка) is a rural locality (a village) in Novoselskoye Rural Settlement, Kovrovsky District, Vladimir Oblast, Russia. The population was 11 as of 2010.

== Geography ==
Drozdovka is located 54 km southwest of Kovrov (the district's administrative centre) by road. Dmitriyevo is the nearest rural locality.

== See also ==
- List of cities and towns in Russia by population
