= Teribersky District =

Teribersky District (Russian: Териберский район), also known as Severomorsky District (Североморский район) was an administrative division (a district) of Murmansk Okrug of Leningrad Oblast of the Russian SFSR, Soviet Union, and later of Murmansk Oblast, which existed in 1927–1963.

It was established on August 1, 1927, when the All-Russian Central Executive Committee issued two Resolutions: "On the Establishment of Leningrad Oblast" and "On the Borders and Composition of the Okrugs of Leningrad Oblast". According to these resolutions, Murmansk Governorate was transformed into Murmansk Okrug, which was divided into six districts (Teribersky being one of them) and included into Leningrad Oblast. The administrative center of the district was in the selo of Teriberka.

In 1934, the Murmansk Okrug Executive Committee developed a redistricting proposal, which was approved by the Resolution of the 4th Plenary Session of the Murmansk Okrug Committee of the VKP(b) on December 28-29, 1934 and by the Resolution of the Presidium of the Murmansk Okrug Executive Committee on February 2, 1935. On February 15, 1935, the VTsIK approved the redistricting of the okrug into seven districts, although it did not specify what territories the new districts were to include. On February 26, 1935, the Presidium of the Leningrad Oblast Executive Committee worked out the details of the new district scheme and issued a resolution, which, among other things, transferred the settlement of Drozdovka of Teribersky District to Saamsky District.

When Polyarny District was abolished on July 9, 1960, the territory of Teribersky District was merged with the territory of the town of Severomorsk, to which the district's subdivisions were subordinated. Teribersky District was nominally retained as an administrative division and renamed Severomorsky.

On February 1, 1963, the Decree by the Presidium of the Supreme Soviet of the RSFSR established the new structure of the districts of Murmansk Oblast, which no longer included Severomorsky District.
