= Kukisvumchorr =

Mountain in Murmansk Oblast, Russia

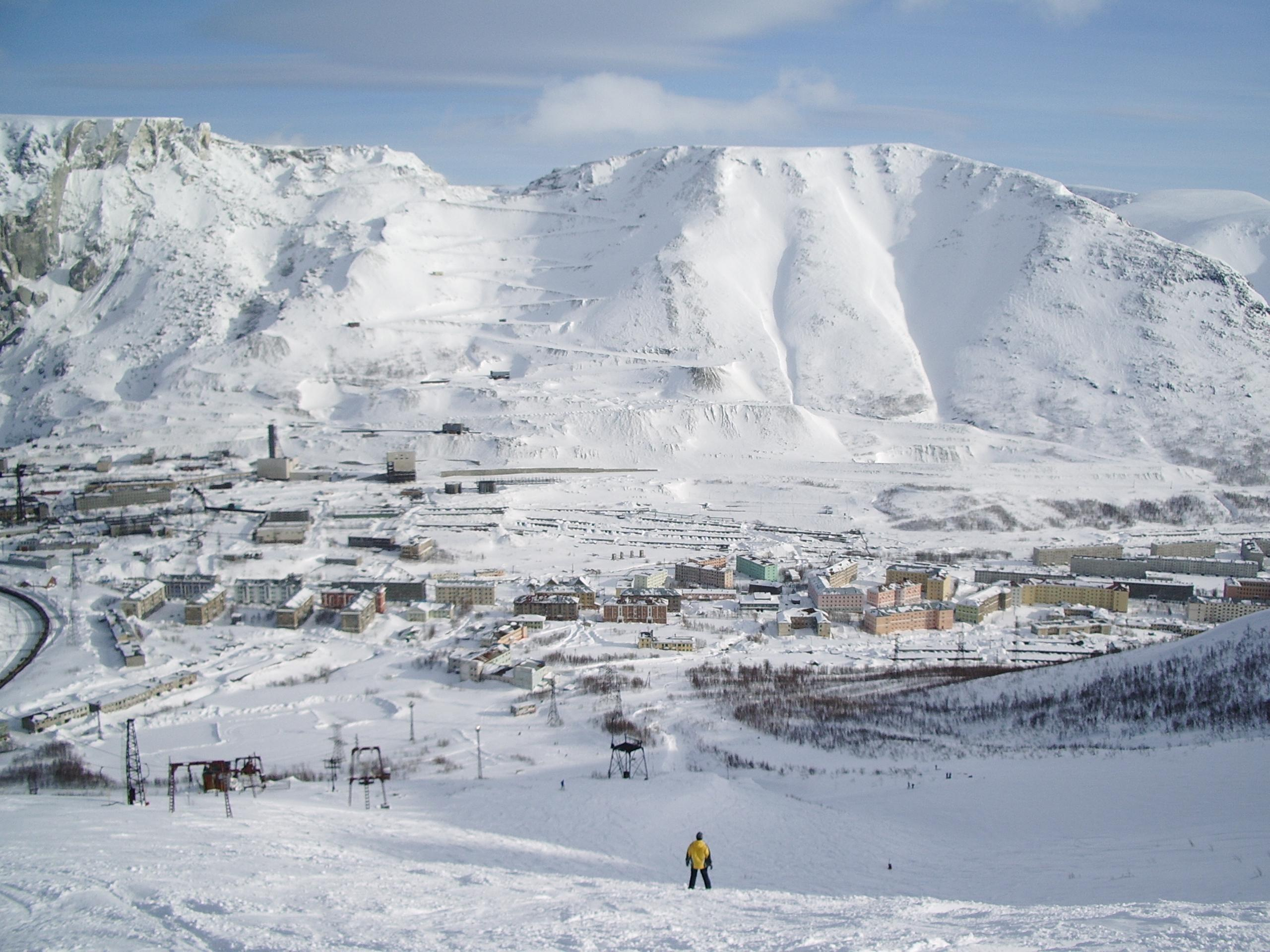

Highest point
- Elevation: 1,143 m (3,750 ft)
- Coordinates: 67°49′52″N 34°31′40″E

Geography
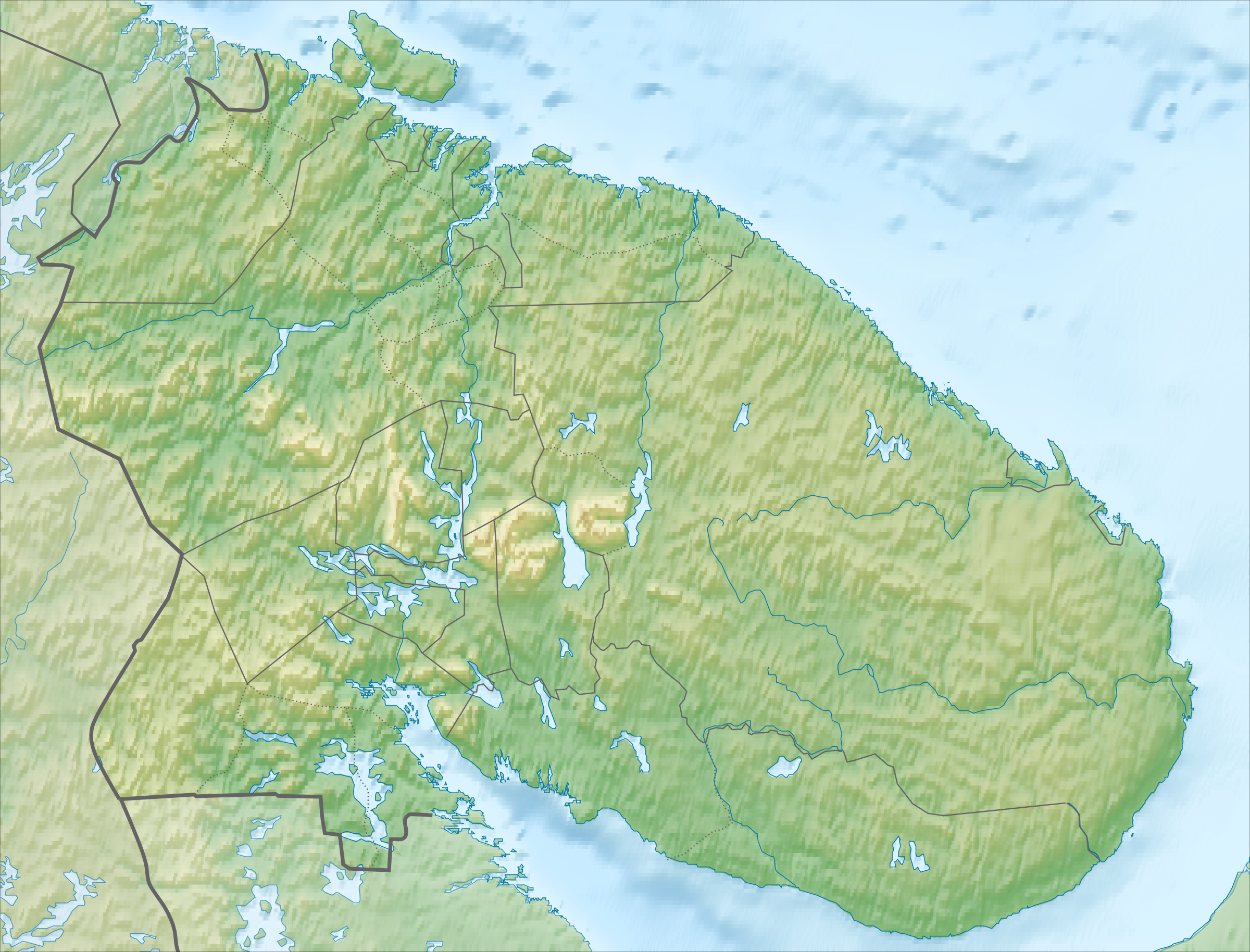
- Location within Murmansk Oblast
- Country: Russia
- Region: Murmansk Oblast
- Parent range: Khibiny Mountains

Kukisvumchorr (Russian: Кукисвумчорр) is a mountain in Murmansk Oblast, Russia.

== Geography ==
The mountain is part of the Khibiny Mountains and is located near the centre of the mountain range. The summit is bare and stony, while the sides are covered with tundra vegetation. The mountain has an interesting mineralogy, notable for its composition of nepheline syenite. Apatite is mined from the area. The nearby Kukisvumchorr Microdistrict shares the same name as the mountain. An earthquake occurred on 21 October 2010 of magnitude 3.2; mining was suspected as a potential cause.

== See also ==
- List of mountains and hills of Russia
