= Kirovsky District, Murmansk Oblast =

Kirovsky District (Russian: Ки́ровский райо́н) was an administrative division (a district) of Murmansk Okrug of Leningrad Oblast, and later a district of Murmansk Oblast, of the Russian SFSR, Soviet Union, which existed in 1935–1954.

In 1934, the Murmansk Okrug Executive Committee developed a redistricting proposal, which was approved by the Resolution of the 4th Plenary Session of the Murmansk Okrug Committee of the VKP(b) on December 28–29, 1934 and by the Resolution of the Presidium of the Murmansk Okrug Executive Committee on February 2, 1935. According to this proposal, Kolsko-Loparsky District was to be abolished, with Kirovsky and Kolsky Districts to be established in its place. On February 15, 1935, the All-Russian Central Executive Committee (VTsIK) approved the redistricting of the okrug into seven districts, including Kirovsky, but did not specify what territories the new districts were to include. On February 26, 1935, the Presidium of the Leningrad Oblast Executive Committee worked out the details of the new district scheme and issued a resolution, which established Kirovsky District on part of the territory of Kolsko-Loparsky District, including the town of Kirovsk with the work settlement of Kukisvumchorr in its jurisdiction, Yena-Babinsky Selsoviet, and the southern part of Ekostrovsky Selsoviet with the station of Khibiny. The administrative center of the new district was in Kirovsk.

On April 21, 1935, the territory of Ekostrovsky Selsoviet which remained in Kolsky District was re-organized as Imandrovsky Selsoviet by the Resolution of the Presidium of Murmansk Okrug Executive Committee. By the Act of the conciliatory committee on October 20, 1935, the selsoviet was transferred to Kirovsky District—a decision approved by the Presidium of Murmansk Okrug Executive Committee on December 4, 1935 and by the Presidium of Leningrad Oblast Executive Committee on April 5, 1936.

On November 25, 1935, the Presidium of the VTsIK granted work settlement status to the inhabited locality of Moncha-Guba, and renamed it Monchegorsk. At the same time, it was transferred from Kolsky to Kirovsky District, which gave a boost to the development of copper-nickel mining in the north of Kirovsky District.

On May 6, 1954, by the Decree of the Presidium of the Supreme Soviet of the Soviet Union, Kirovsk was elevated in status to that of a town under oblast jurisdiction. At the same time, Kirovsky District was abolished, and its territory was subordinated to Kirovsk.
