= Sredny Peninsula =

Peninsula in European Russia

Сре́дний полуо́стров
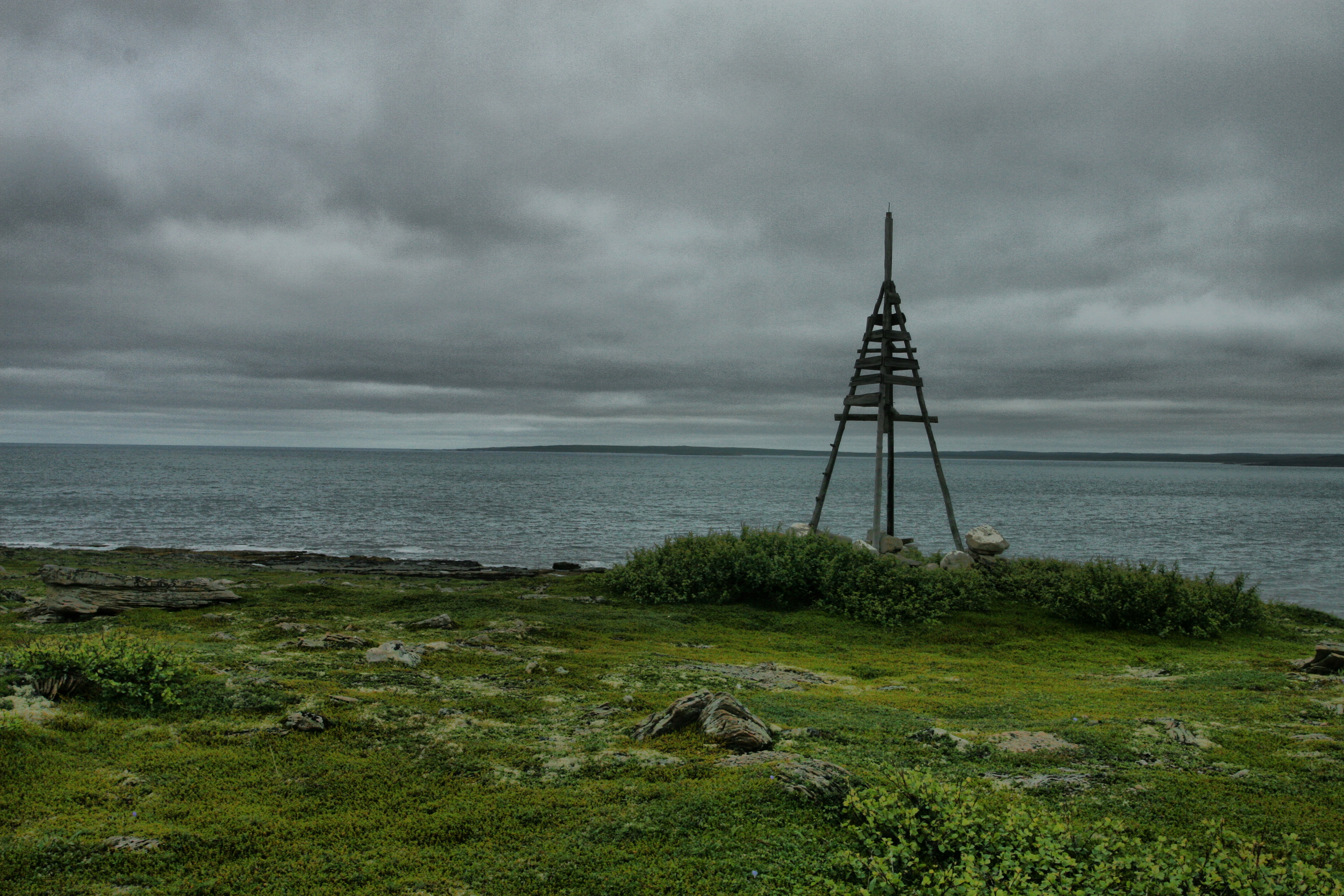
- Geodesy tower
- Interactive map of Sredny Peninsula

Geography
- Coordinates: 69°43′43″N 31°56′14″E
- Adjacent to: Barents Sea

Administration
- Russia
- oblast: Murmansk Oblast

Sredny Peninsula (Russian: Сре́дний полуо́стров, lit. middle peninsula) is a peninsula at north part of continental European Russia. The peninsula is connected with the continent by a thin isthmus and with Rybachy Peninsula by a similar thin isthmus, making it nearly completely surrounded by water. Administratively, it is a part of Pechengsky District of Murmansk Oblast and is within several hours of ride from Murmansk.

== History ==
After the Russian Revolution, the western parts of Sredny and Rybachy Peninsulas were ceded to Finland. After the Winter War of 1939–1940, Finland ceded them to the Soviet Union by the Moscow Peace Treaty.
