= Saamsky District =

Saamsky District (Russian: Саамский район) was an administrative division (a district) of Murmansk Okrug of Leningrad Oblast, and later of Murmansk Oblast, of the Russian SFSR, Soviet Union, which existed in 1927–1963.

It was established as Ponoysky District (Понойский район) on August 1, 1927, when the All-Russian Central Executive Committee issued two Resolutions: "On the Establishment of Leningrad Oblast" and "On the Borders and Composition of the Okrugs of Leningrad Oblast". According to these resolutions, Murmansk Governorate was transformed into Murmansk Okrug, which was divided into six districts (Ponoysky being one of them) and included into Leningrad Oblast. The administrative center of the district was in the selo of Ponoy.

In 1934, the Murmansk Okrug Executive Committee developed a redistricting proposal, which was approved by the Resolution of the 4th Plenary Session of the Murmansk Okrug Committee of the VKP(b) on December 28-29, 1934 and by the Resolution of the Presidium of the Murmansk Okrug Executive Committee on February 2, 1935. On February 15, 1935, the VTsIK approved the redistricting of the okrug into seven districts, although it did not specify what territories the new districts were to include. On February 26, 1935, the Presidium of the Leningrad Oblast Executive Committee worked out the details of the new district scheme and issued a resolution, which, among other things, renamed the district Saamsky and moved its administrative center to Iokanga. Additionally, Chalmny-Varrsky and Semiostrovsky Selsoviets of Lovozersky District, as well as the settlement of Drozdovka of Teribersky District, were transferred to Saamsky District. On June 1, 1936, the renaming of the district and the administrative center move were approved by the Resolution of the VTsIK.

Iokanga, the administrative center of the district at the time, comprised de facto two separate inhabited localities, located within 12 kilometers (7.5 mi) from one another—Iokanga proper and Iokangskaya baza, with the district executive committee quarters being located in the latter. In 1936, Iokangskaya baza was renamed Gremikha, but Iokanga continued to be listed as the administrative center of Saamsky District until February 1938.

Chalmny-Varrsky selsoviet did not remain in Saamsky District for long—the VTsIK Resolution of September 10, 1937 transferred it back to Lovozersky District.

Saamsky District was abolished on January 26, 1963 by the Decision of the Murmansk Oblast Executive Committee. The district's selsoviets were transferred to Lovozersky District, while Gremikha, the administrative center of the former district, was subordinated to Severomorsk.
