= Murmansk Oblast =

First-level administrative division of Russia

Murmansk Oblast Мурманская область (Russian)
- Oblast
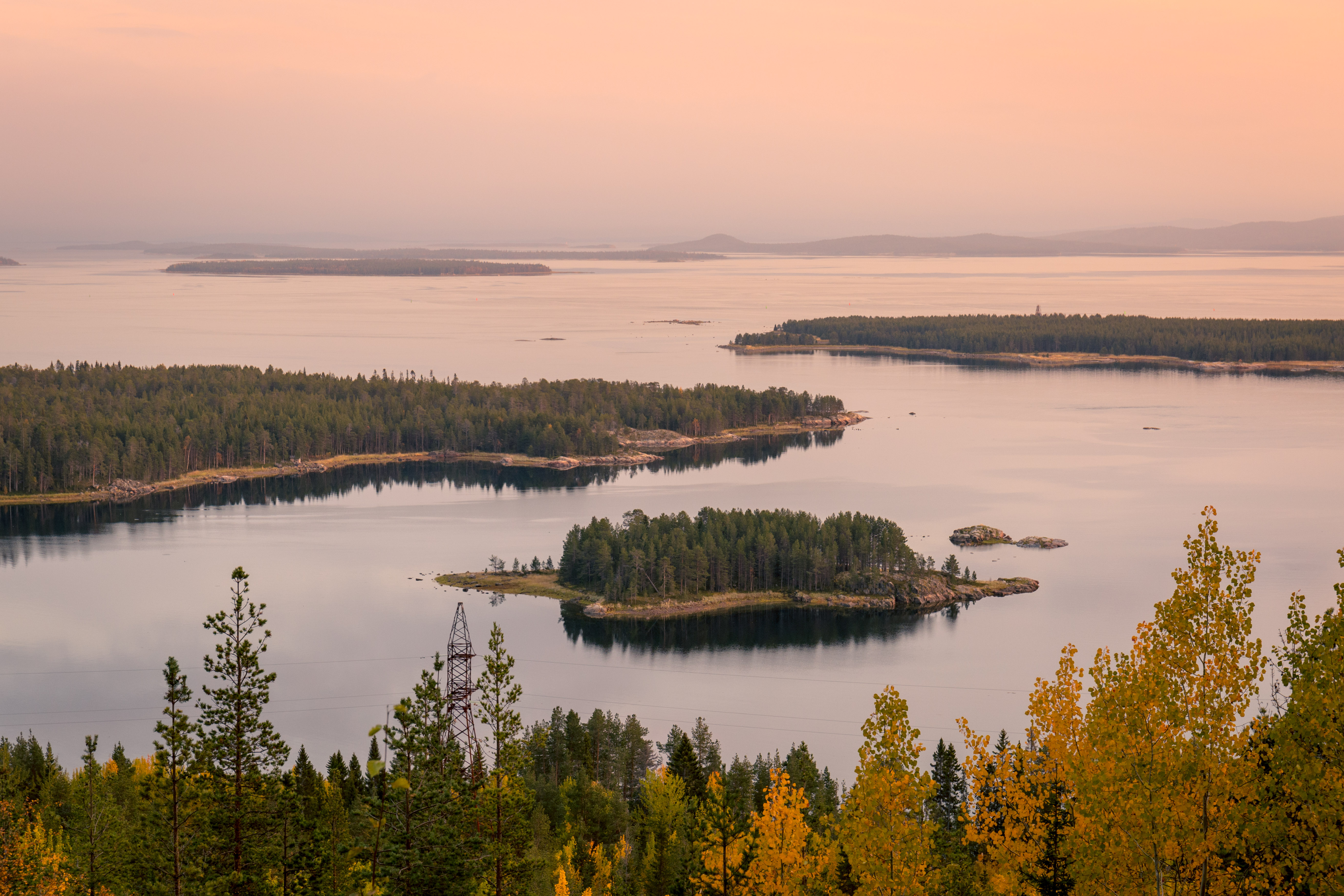
- Kandalaksha Gulf

- Flag Coat of arms

- Coordinates: 68°02′N 34°34′E
- Country: Russia
- Federal district: Northwestern
- Economic region: Northern
- Established: May 28, 1938
- Administrative center: Murmansk

Government
  - Body: Oblast Duma
  - Governor: Andrey Chibis

Area
  - Total: 144,902 km^{2} (55,947 sq mi)
  - Rank: 26th

Population (2021 census)
  - Total: 667,744
  - Estimate (2018): 753,557
  - Rank: 62nd
  - Density: 4.60825/km^{2} (11.9353/sq mi)
  - Urban: 93.1%
  - Rural: 6.9%

GDP (nominal, 2024)
  - Total: ₽1.13 trillion (US$13.22 billion)
  - Per capita: ₽1.71 million (US$20,120.02)
- Time zone: UTC+3 (MSK)
- ISO 3166 code: RU-MUR
- License plates: 51
- OKTMO ID: 47000000
- Official languages: Russian
- Website: http://www.gov-murman.ru/

Murmansk Oblast (Note: Russian: Му́рманская о́бласть, romanized: Murmanskaya oblastʹ, Russian pronunciation: [ˈmurmənskəjə ˈobləsʲtʲ]; Kildin Sami: Мурман е̄ммьне, romanized: Murman jemmʹne; Norwegian: Murmansk fylke; Finnish: Murmanskin alue) is a federal subject (an oblast) of Russia, located in the northwestern part of the country, with a total land area of 144,900 square kilometres (55,900 sq mi). Its only internal border is the Republic of Karelia to the south, and it is bordered internationally by Finland to the west and Norway to the northwest and the Barents Sea lies to the north and White Sea lies to the south and east. Its administrative center and largest city is the port city of Murmansk. As of the 2010 Census, its population was 795,409; however, at the 2021 Census, the population had declined to 667,744.

== Geography ==
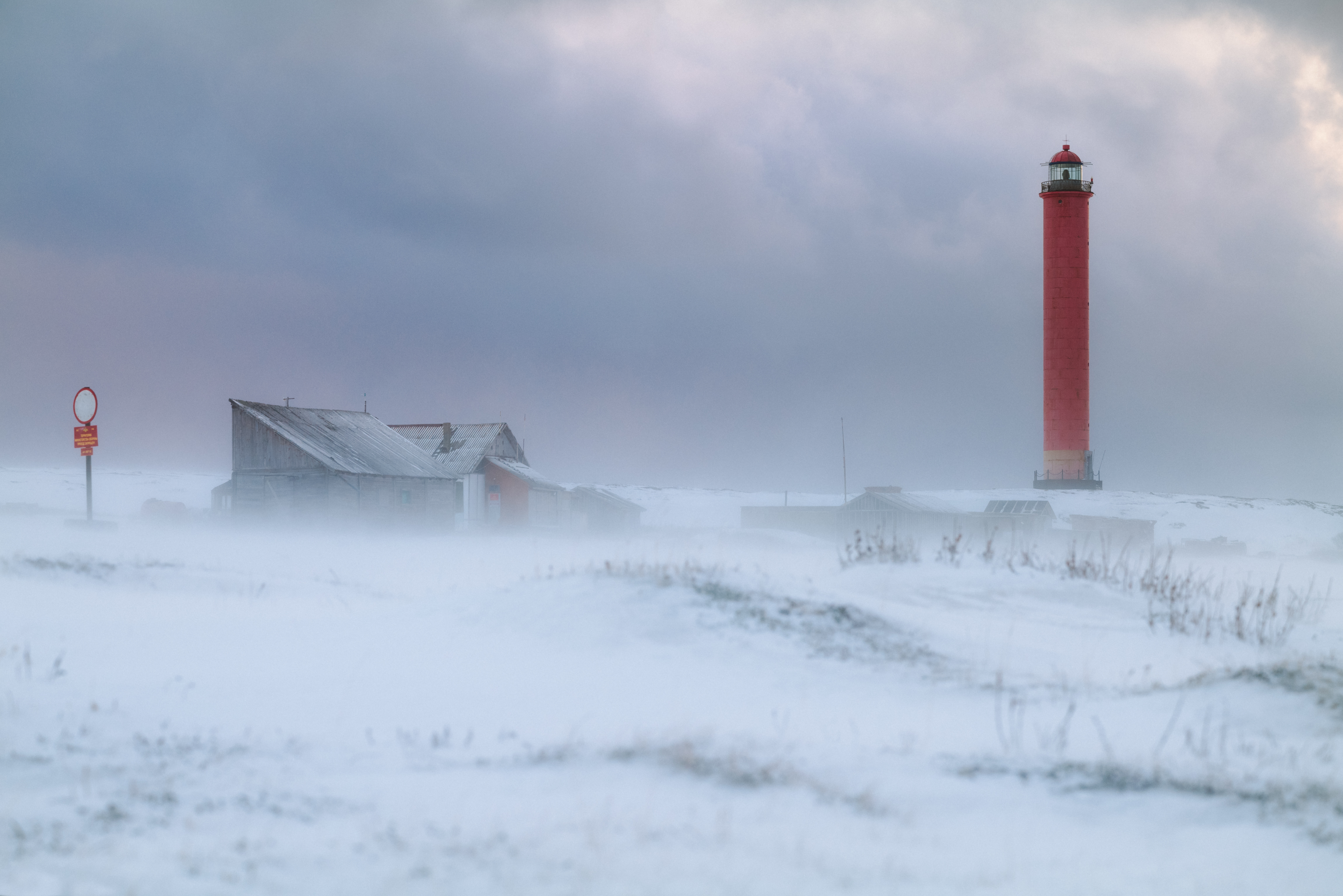
Vaidagubsky lighthouse in Murmansk Oblast

Geographically, Murmansk Oblast is located mainly on the Kola Peninsula almost completely north of the Arctic Circle and is a part of the larger Sápmi region that spans over four countries. The oblast borders with the Republic of Karelia in Russia in the south, Lapland Region in Finland in the west, Finnmark County in Norway in the northwest, and is bounded by the Barents Sea in the north and the White Sea in the south and east. Arkhangelsk Oblast of Russia lies across the White Sea.

Much of the oblast's relief is hilly, with the Khibiny and Lovozero ranges rising as high as 1,200 meters (3,900 ft) above sea level and stretching from west to east. The highest point of Murmansk Oblast is Yudychvumchorr, a flat-topped peak of the Khibiny. The north of the oblast is mostly covered by tundra; forest-tundra prevails further south, while the southern regions are in the taiga zone. There are over 100,000 lakes and 18,000 rivers in the oblast. The coast contains the Rybachy Peninsula and the Cape Svyatoy Nos peninsulas.

The climate is harsh and unstable, due to the proximity of the Gulf Stream on one side and Arctic cold fronts on the other. Sharp temperature changes, high winds, and abundant precipitation are common throughout the year, with the heating season lasting for ten straight months. However, the waters of the Murman Coast in the south remain warm enough to remain ice-free even in winter.

There is also a large number of islands belonging to the oblast, the main ones being (west to east) the Aynovy Islands, Bolshoy Oleny Island, Kildin Island Malyy Oleniy Island, Kharlov Island, Vesknyak Island, Litskiye Island, Nokuyev Island, Vitte Island, Lumbovskiy Island, Goryainov Island and Sosnovets Island.

=== Lakes ===
- Lake Yurkhyamyayarvi
- Lake Lovozero

=== Climate ===
Most areas of the Kola Peninsula are subarctic climate (Köppen climate classification: Dfc). The nearby islands usually belong to tundra (Köppen climate classification: ET).

Monthly average highs and lows for various cities and towns in Murmansk Oblast in Celsius and Fahrenheit
City	Jan	Feb	Mar	Apr	May	Jun	Jul	Aug	Sep	Oct	Nov	Dec
Murmansk	−6.5 / −12.7 (20.3 / 9.1)	−6.4 / −12.3 (20.5 / 9.9)	−1.9 / −8.2 (28.6 / 17.2)	2.9 / −3.3 (37.2 / 26.1)	8.4 / 1.5 (47.1 / 34.7)	13.8 / 5.9 (56.8 / 42.6)	17.7 / 9.6 (63.9 / 49.3)	15.3 / 8.3 (59.5 / 46.9)	10.7 / 5.1 (51.3 / 41.2)	3.6 / −0.3 (38.5 / 31.5)	−1.8 / −6.2 (28.8 / 20.8)	−4.1 / −9.6 (24.6 / 14.7)
Kandalaksha	−7.7 / −15.8 (18.1 / 3.6)	−6.9 / −15.4 (19.6 / 4.3)	−1.6 / −11.1 (29.1 / 12.0)	3.8 / −5.1 (38.8 / 22.8)	9.8 / 1.1 (49.6 / 34.0)	16.2 / 7.0 (61.2 / 44.6)	19.5 / 10.5 (67.1 / 50.9)	16.9 / 8.4 (62.4 / 47.1)	11.4 / 3.8 (52.5 / 38.8)	4.0 / −1.4 (39.2 / 29.5)	−1.9 / −7.5 (28.6 / 18.5)	−5.0 / −12.0 (23.0 / 10.4)
Vayda-Guba	−2.2 / −7.3 (28.0 / 18.9)	−2.7 / −7.9 (27.1 / 17.8)	−1.1 / −5.6 (30.0 / 21.9)	1.8 / −2.6 (35.2 / 27.3)	6.4 / 1.4 (43.5 / 34.5)	10.3 / 5.1 (50.5 / 41.2)	14.1 / 8.4 (57.4 / 47.1)	13.4 / 8.2 (56.1 / 46.8)	10.0 / 5.4 (50.0 / 41.7)	4.8 / 1.0 (40.6 / 33.8)	1.1 / −3.2 (34.0 / 26.2)	−0.6 / −5.2 (30.9 / 22.6)
Sosnovets Island	−5.7 / −10.7 (21.7 / 12.7)	−6.2 / −11.2 (20.8 / 11.8)	−3.6 / −8.7 (25.5 / 16.3)	0.0 / −4.8 (32.0 / 23.4)	4.3 / −0.4 (39.7 / 31.3)	8.9 / 3.8 (48.0 / 38.8)	12.4 / 7.2 (54.3 / 45.0)	12.0 / 7.8 (53.6 / 46.0)	9.6 / 5.8 (49.3 / 42.4)	4.7 / 1.0 (40.5 / 33.8)	−0.1 / −3.9 (31.8 / 25.0)	−3.1 / −7.0 (26.4 / 19.4)

== History ==
The Saami, now a very small minority, are the indigenous people of the region. Russians started exploring the shores of the White Sea as early as in the 12th century, and in 1916 during World War I founded the Russian city of Murmansk as an ice-free supply port. As of 2010, Murmansk had 307,257 (2010 census), people – nearly 40% of the oblast's population. Many Finns also immigrated to Murmansk during the Finnish famine, around the year 1860.

The oblast was established on May 28, 1938 from Murmansk Okrug of Leningrad Oblast (comprising the city of Murmansk, Kirovsky, Kolsky, Lovozersky, Polyarny, Saamsky, Teribersky, and Tersky Districts) and Kandalakshsky District of the Karelian ASSR.

The area of Pechengsky District (Petsamo in Finnish), which was ceded to Finland by the 1920 Treaty of Tartu and gave Finland access to the Barents Sea, became once again part of the RSFSR in 1940. After the Paris Peace Treaties of 1947, the local Saami population was given the choice either of staying in Soviet Russia or resettling in Finland. Most of them chose the second option. On 30 October 1997, Murmansk, alongside Astrakhan, Kirov, Ulyanovsk, and Yaroslavl signed a power-sharing agreement with the government of Russia, gaining autonomy. The autonomous status operated until 31 May 2003.

== Politics ==
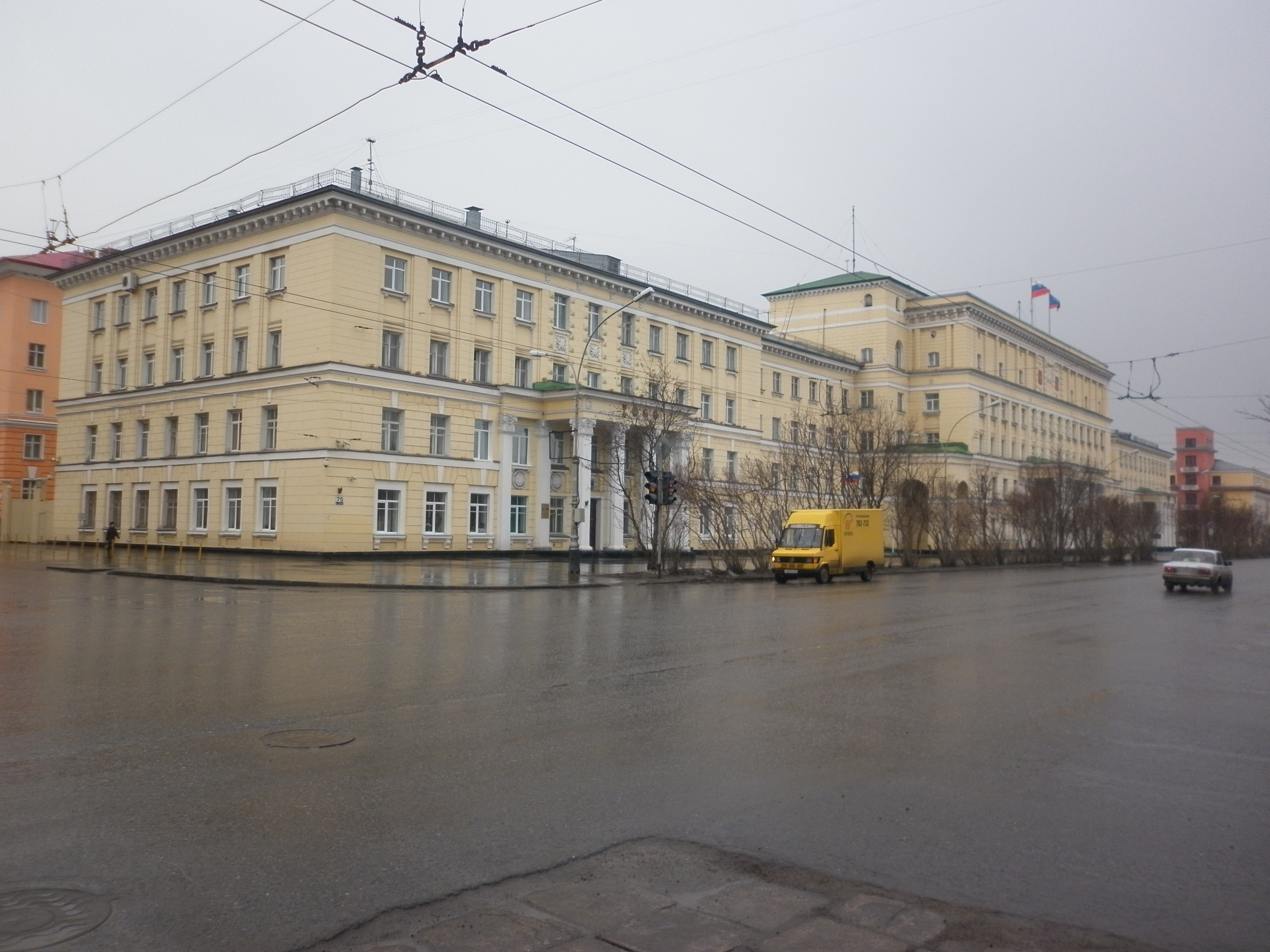
Oblast Administration (right) and City Administration (left) buildings on Lenin's Avenue, Murmansk

During the Soviet period, the high authority in the oblast was shared between three persons: The first secretary of the Murmansk CPSU Committee (who in reality had the biggest authority), the chairman of the oblast Soviet (legislative power), and the Chairman of the oblast Executive Committee (executive power). Since 1991, CPSU lost all the power, and the head of the Oblast administration, and eventually the governor was appointed/elected alongside elected regional parliament.

The Charter of Murmansk Oblast is the fundamental law of the region. The Legislative Assembly of Murmansk Oblast is the province's standing legislative (representative) body. The Legislative Assembly exercises its authority by passing laws, resolutions, and other legal acts and by supervising the implementation and observance of the laws and other legal acts passed by it. The highest executive body is the Oblast Government, which includes territorial executive bodies such as district administrations, committees, and commissions that facilitate development and run the day to day matters of the province. The Oblast administration supports the activities of the Governor who is the highest official and acts as guarantor of the observance of the oblast Charter by the Constitution of Russia.

=== Governors of Murmansk Oblast ===
Name	Period
Yury Yevdokimov	December 1997 – March 21, 2009
Dmitry Dmitriyenko	March 21, 2009 – April 4, 2012
Marina Kovtun	April 4, 2012 – March 21, 2019
Andrey Chibis	March 21, 2019 – incumbent

=== Chairmen of the Murmansk Oblast Duma ===
Name	Period
Pavel Sazhinov	1994–2007
Yevgeny Nikora	2007–2011
Vasily Shambir	2011–2014
Mikhail Ilinykh	2014 – Incumbent

== Demographics ==
Historical population
Year	Pop.	±%
1926	23,006	—
1959	567,672	+2367.5%
1970	799,527	+40.8%
1979	965,462	+20.8%
1989	1,146,757	+18.8%
2002	892,534	−22.2%
2010	795,409	−10.9%
2021	667,744	−16.1%
2025	650,920	−2.5%
Source: Census data, estimate

Population: 667,744. (2021 census); 795,409 (2010 census); 892,534 (2002 census); 1,146,757 (1989 Soviet census).

The indigenous people of the area, the Saami, are only a tiny minority today. As of the 2002 Census, 92.2% of the oblast's population live in urban areas. The most populous city is the Oblast's administrative center, Murmansk, with 270,000 inhabitants in 2021. Other large cities and towns include Severomorsk, Apatity, Kandalaksha, Monchegorsk, and Kirovsk.

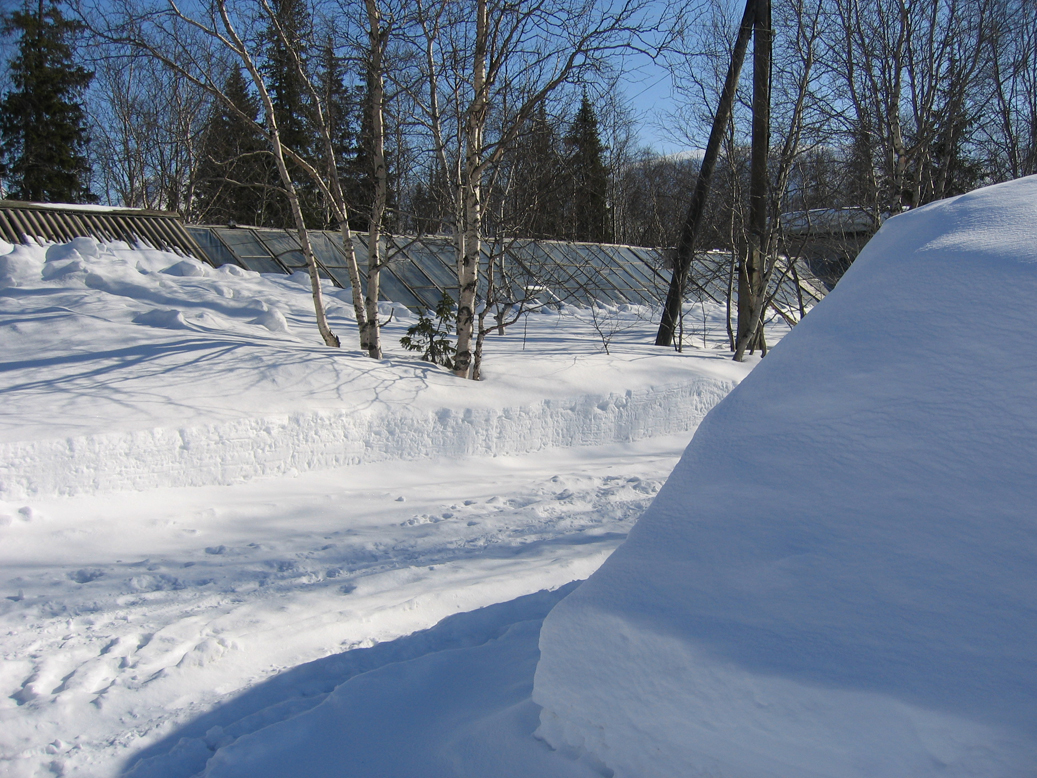
The Polar Alpine Botanical Garden (Полярно-альпийский ботанический сад-институт) in Kirovsk

Ethnicities in Murmansk Oblast in 2021
Ethnicity	Population	Percentage
Russians	515,521	89.9%
Ukrainians	13,353	2.3%
Belarusians	4,529	0.8%
Tatars	3,328	0.6%
Azerbaijanis	3,132	0.5%
Sami	1,363	0.2%
Other Ethnicities	32,015	5.7%
Ethnicity not stated	94,503	–

Vital statistics for 2024:

- Births: 5,108 (7.8 per 1,000)
- Deaths: 8,068 (12.3 per 1,000)

Total fertility rate (2024):
1.38 children per woman

Life expectancy (2021):
Total — 68.29 years (male — 63.72, female — 72.85)

In 2009, the urban areas were marked by natural population decline (−0.16% per year) and the rural areas were marked by natural population growth (+0.35% per year).

=== Religion ===
Religion in Murmansk Oblast as of 2012 (Sreda Arena Atlas)
Russian Orthodoxy	41.7%
Other Orthodox	1.1%
Other Christians	3.7%
Islam	1%
Spiritual but not religious	28.4%
Atheism and irreligion	11.7%
Other and undeclared	12.4%

According to a 2012 survey 41.7% of the population of Murmansk Oblast adheres to the Russian Orthodox Church, 3% are unaffiliated generic Christians, 1% are Orthodox Christian believers who do not belong to any church or are members of other (non-Russian) Orthodox churches, 1% are adherents of Islam, 0.4% are adherents of Rodnovery (Slavic native faith) and other indigenous folk religions, and 1% are members of the Catholic Church. In addition, 28% of the population declares to be "spiritual but not religious", 12% is atheist, and 12.5% follows other religions or did not give an answer to the question.

== Economy ==
The Murmansk Oblast is very rich in natural resources and has deposits of over 700 minerals. The main industries of the region are in the sphere of raw material extraction and basic processing. The largest industries are metallurgy (36,6%), electric power-production (22,9%) and food-industry, including fishing (13,7%). The icefree port of Murmansk plays an important role in marine transportation in Russia, and the oblast has a 41% share of the total Russian marine transport market. The fishing industry is among the most profitable in the region, supplying 16% of Russia's total fish production. Murmansk is a key base for three fishing fleets, including Russia's largest, the Murmansk Trawl Fleet.

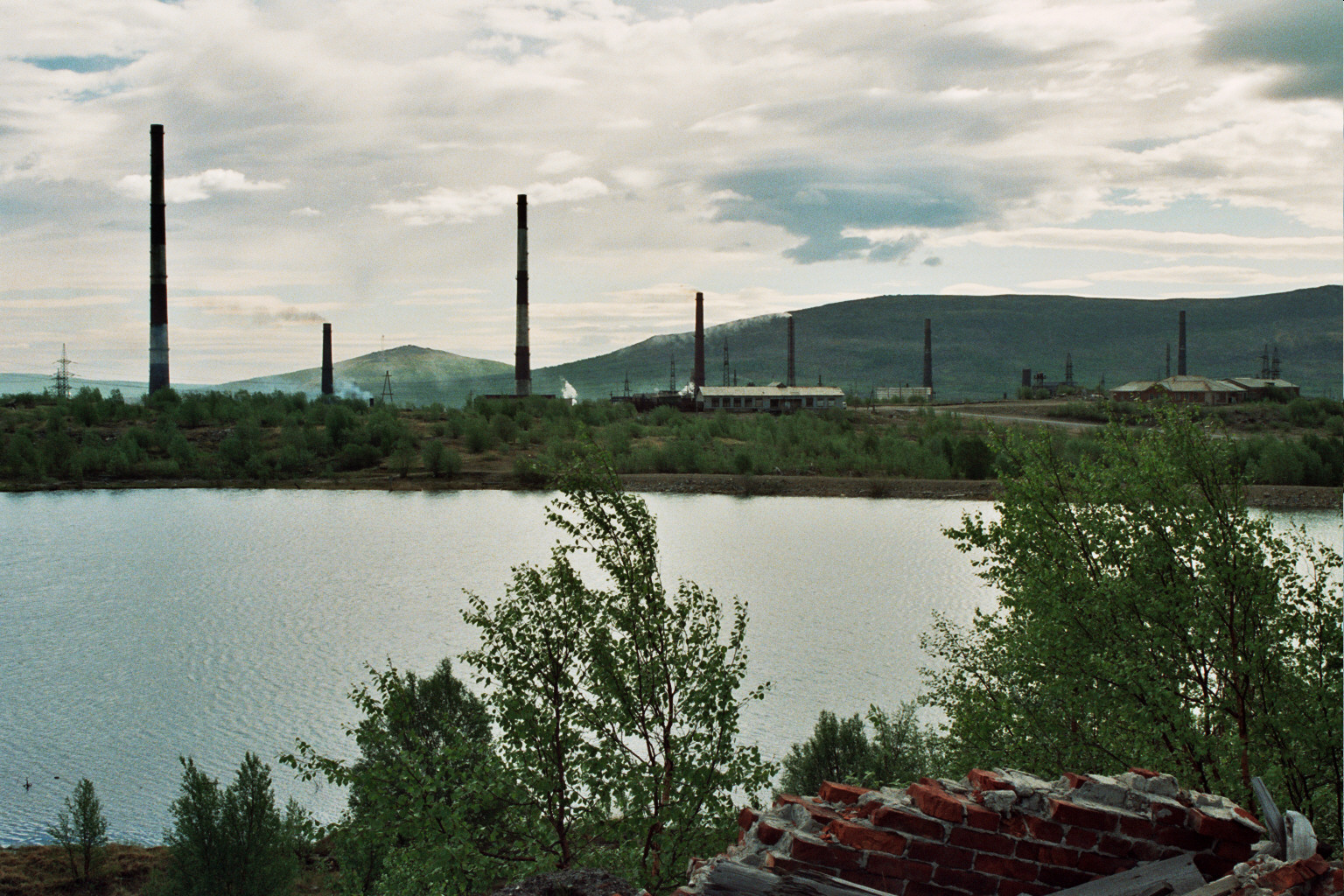
A Norilsk Nickel plant (formerly, Severonikel) in Monchegorsk

The economy of the region is export-oriented. Main export items are nickel products, apatite concentrate, copper and copper products, aluminium and ferrous metals. The Murmansk Region produces almost 100 percent of Russia's apatite concentrate (3.7 million tons in 1998), 43 percent of nickel, 15 percent of copper, 12 percent of iron ore and iron ore concentrate (17.7 million and 6.4 million tons in 1998), and 40 percent of cobalt.

The largest companies of the region – constituting 90% of the oblast's production – are Pechenganickel, Olcon, the Kola Nuclear Power Plant, Sevrybkholodflot, Murmanrybprom, Murmansk Trawl Fleet and Murmansk Shipping Company.

Large oil and gas resources have been discovered on the shelf of the Barents sea, including the massive Shtokman field – one of the world's largest gas fields with estimated reserves of 3.8 trillion cubic meters. Prospective oil fields could potentially yield up to 40 million tons in the next 10–15 years. However, the development of the oil and gas resources will require considerable investment.

In 2006, the Murmansk Oblast's gross regional product was 141.9 billion rubles, which amounts to about 0.4% of the Russian GDP. Unemployment in 2006 was 3,4%. GRP per capita in 2007 was 225,044 rubles. Regional automobile code is 51.

=== Transport ===
- Airports in Murmansk (international), Kirovsk, Kandalaksha, Severomorsk (military), Lovozero (military), Ponoy, and Krasnoshchelye (small planes and helicopters).
- Strategic Oktyabrskaya Railway which connects Murmansk with Saint-Petersburg and central Russia. Main stations are Murmansk, Olenegorsk, Kandalaksha. There is also important shoulder to Nikel, the Murmansk-Nikel Railway.
- Local one-way railways
- Sea routes to small military towns and naval bases on Murman Coast (Ostrovnoy, Svyatoy Nos).
- Automobile roads

== Military ==
The Murmansk Oblast plays an important role for the Russian Navy, the Northern Fleet having its headquarters in Severomorsk, 25 km north of Murmansk. The Navy has several other bases and shipyards in the Murmansk Oblast.

The 200th Separate Motor Rifle Brigade is stationed at Pechenga.

== See also ==
- Barents Region
- Lake Chudzyavr
- Lake Kildinskoye
