= R12 road (Russia) =

Road connecting Finland and Russia

Federal Highway R12
- Федеральная автомобильная дорога Р12
- Lotta

Route information
- Length: 231 km (144 mi)

Major junctions
- Ost end: Murmansk
- R21 highway
- West end: Finnish border

Location
- Country: Russia

Highway system
- Russian Federal Highways

The Russian route R12, also known as the Lotta, is a regional road that which connects Murmansk and Finland (Finland–Russia border). Its length is 231 km.

Until the middle of the twentieth century, missing road links from Kola and Murmansk to Finland along the Lotta River. The need for a road arose in the 1960s, in connection with the construction of the Upper Tuloma Hydroelectric Power Plant. The Upper Tuloma Hydroelectric Power Plant was built by Soviet and Finnish specialists. The construction of the road began in 1961. The road to the village of builders, which later became known as Verkhnetulomsky, was also built by the joint efforts of the two countries. From Kola the road was built by Soviet builders, from Finland by Finnish builders.

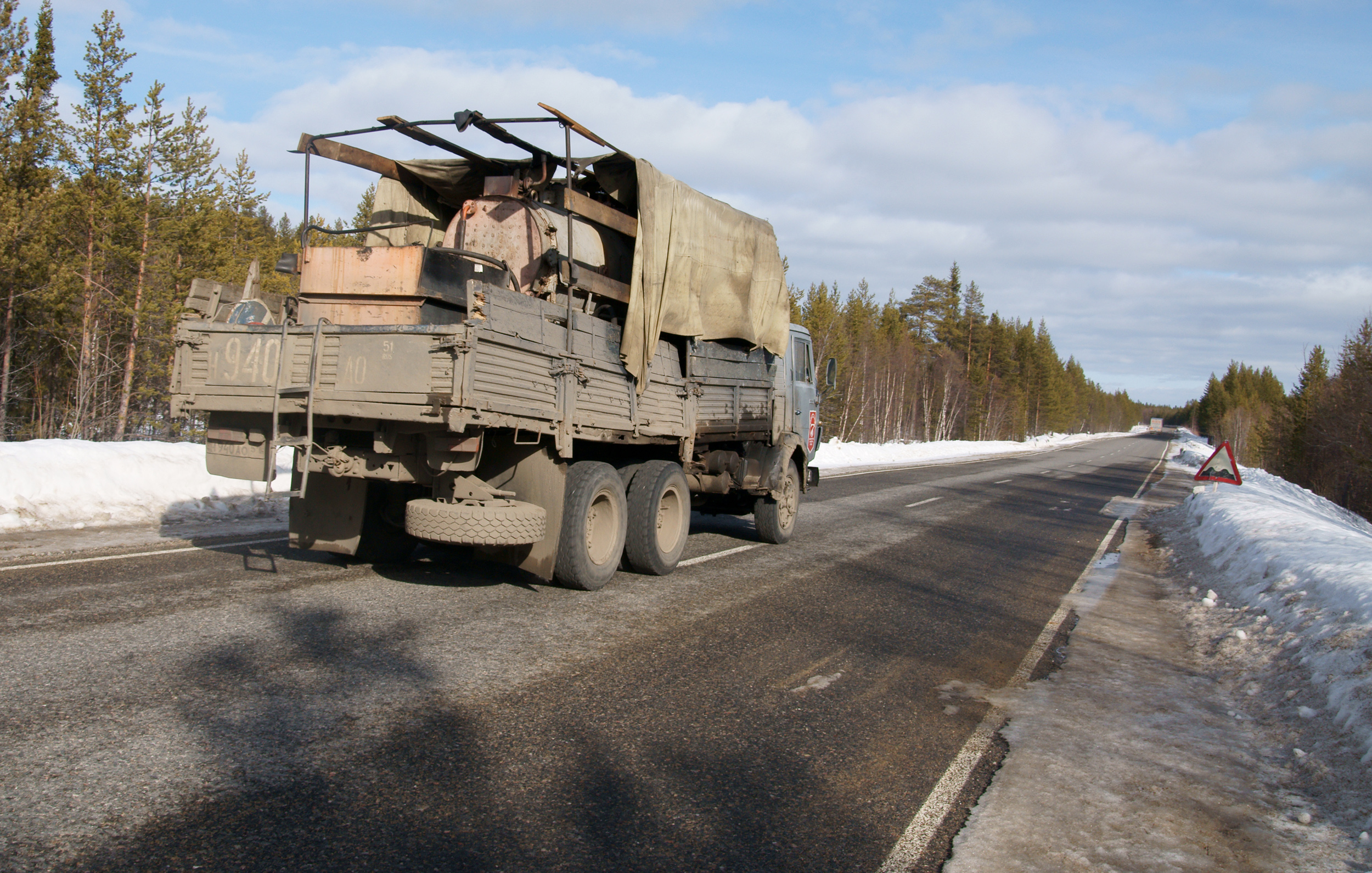
50 km from the Finland–Russia border

In 1967, the frontier and customs post "Lotta" was opened on the road.

In 2010, 191 km of the road from 231 had asphalt concrete, the remaining 40 km had gravel concrete.

Major settlements along the road include Murmansk, Tuloma, Verkhnetulomsky, and Svetly. After crossing the border, the route continues to Ivalo.
