= R12 =

R12 may refer to:

== Automobiles ==
- BMW R12, a motorcycle
- Renault 12, a French family car

== Aviation ==
- Bell R-12, an American utility helicopter
- Caudron R.12, a French experimental biplane
- Republic XR-12 Rainbow, an American experimental reconnaissance aircraft
- R-12 Kassel/Rothwesten, a former United States Army Air Corps airfield in Germany
- Rubik R-12 Kevély, a Hungarian training glider
- Yakovlev R-12, a Soviet prototype reconnaissance aircraft

== Roads ==
- R12 road (Belgium)
- R12 road (Ghana)
- R-12 regional road (Montenegro)
- R12 road (Russia)

== Public transport ==
- R12 (New York City Subway car)
- R12 (Rodalies de Catalunya), a regional rail line in Catalonia, Spain
- Kenilworth Avenue Line of the Washington Metropolitan Area Transit Authority

== Vessels ==
- HMS Contest (R12), a destroyer of the Royal Navy
- HMS Hermes (R12), an aircraft carrier of the Royal Navy
- HMS R12, a submarine of the Royal Navy
- USS R-12 (SS-89), a submarine of the United States Navy

== Other uses ==
- R12 (cemetery), a Neolithic cemetery in Sudan
- Dichlorodifluoromethane, a refrigerant
- Ndombe language
- R-12 Dvina, a Soviet ballistic missile
- R12: Extremely flammable, a risk phrase
- Small nucleolar RNA R12
