= Tuloma =

Tuloma may refer to:

- Tuloma (river), a river in Murmansk Oblast, Russia
- Tuloma (rural locality), a rural locality (a selo) in Murmansk Oblast, Russia
