= Vuva =

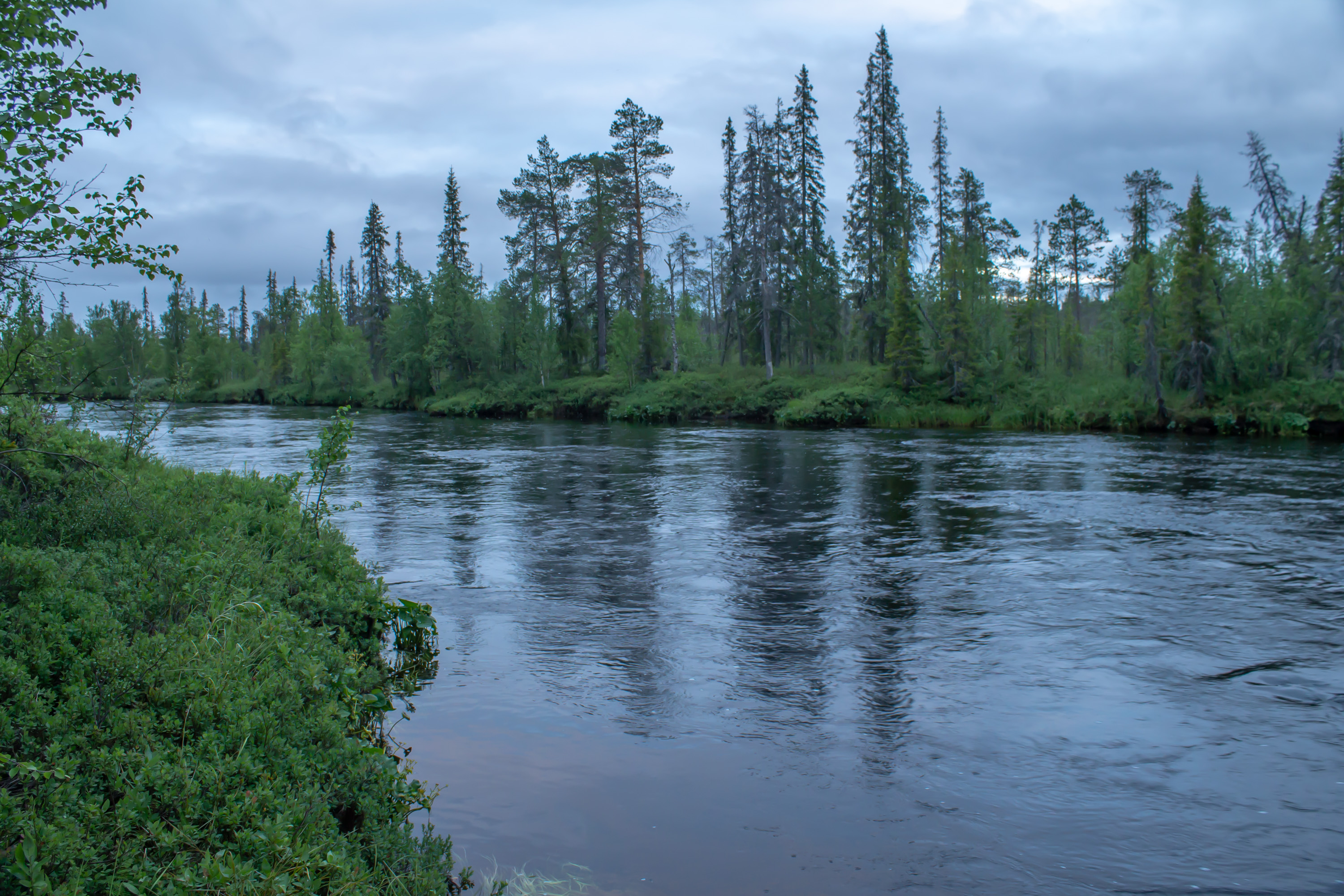
- Native name: Вува (Russian)

Location
- Country: Russia
- Region: Murmansk Oblast

Physical characteristics
- Source: Salnie Tundry
- Mouth: Verkhnetulomskoye Reservoir
  - coordinates: 68.0851°N 30.7761°E
- Length: 61 km (38 mi)

Basin features
- Progression: Verkhnetulomskoye Reservoir→ Tuloma→ Barents Sea

The Vuva (Russian: Вува) is a river in the north-west of the Kola Peninsula in Murmansk Oblast, Russia. It is 61 km in length. The Vuva originates in the Salnie Tundry and flows into the Verkhnetulomskoye Reservoir.
