= Borders of Finland =

Political boundaries between Finland and neighboring territories

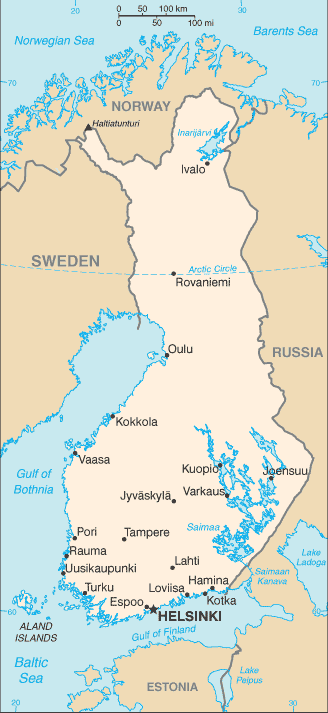
Finland

Border changes in Finland

The borders of Finland are the dividing lines between it and the neighbouring countries of Norway, Russia and Sweden. The total length of land borders (incl. rivers) of Finland is 2,563 km / 1593 mi (Norway 709 km / 441 mi, Sweden 545 km / 339 mi, Russia 1309 km / 813 mi).

== Borders ==
=== Norway ===
The border between Norway and Finland is 736 kilometers (457 mi) long. It is a land and river border between two tripoints. The western tripoint is marked by Treriksröset, a stone cairn where both countries border Sweden. The eastern tripoint is marked by Treriksrøysa, a stone cairn where both countries border Russia.

The border was defined in a 1751 treaty, which also defined the Swedish–Norwegian border. In the period 1738–1751 field investigations and negotiations took place on the border, although the Finnish part needed less negotiation. Cairns were erected ending with one at Nesseby in 1766. A treaty in 1816 with Russia, which possessed Finland, defined the easternmost part of the border. Between 1920 and 1944, the Petsamo area belonged to Finland, so the Finland–Norway border extended along the present Norway–Russia border to the ocean. The 1751 treaty granted the Sami people the right to cross the border freely with their reindeer, as they traditionally had done. In 1852, the Norway–Finland/Russia was closed, causing trouble for the Sami, who needed the Finnish forests for reindeer winter grazing. The Finland–Norway border is open, as both countries are part of the Schengen Area. It is legal to cross the border anywhere if no customs declaration or passport check is needed. An 8-meter (26 ft) wide clear-cut zone straddles the land border. Almost half of the border follows the Anarjohka and Tana rivers.

=== Russia ===
The year 1917 was important to the establishment of a border between Finland and Russia. The existing customs border was open. After 1917 Finland created an independent foreign policy and shifted attention to the West. This shift can be observed in its export patterns. Before 1917, almost one third went to Russia, dropping below 5% in the years thereafter. Russia was increasingly portrayed as separate from Finland. Views hardened and before the Second World War Russians were almost seen as barbarians by Finns. For over 70 years the border was practically closed. The border became more and more problematic. In negotiations in October 1939, the main Soviet demand was that the Finns cede small parcels of territory, including a naval base on the Gulf of Finland that the Soviets wanted to help them protect Leningrad. In exchange, the Soviets offered to cede to Finland about 8800 square kilometers of Karelia along the Finnish border, or about twice the amount of land to be ceded by Finland. Finland rejected these demands, and on November 30, 1939, the Winter War started when Russia invaded Finland without a declaration of war. However, the Finnish resistance held much longer than expected and hostilities ceased in March 1940. The Moscow Peace Treaty was signed and Finland ceded more than 10% of its pre-war territory, much of its industry and power generation, and the fourth largest city, Viipuri, to Russia, resulting in the migration of approximately 12% of the Finish population behind the new border. After the treaty signing, hostilities continued especially in the area of Eastern Karelia. The 1940 border was confirmed in the Treaty of Paris in 1947. In 1992 both countries signed the ‘neighboring area cooperation’ agreement. This agreement led to the promotion of cross border cooperation schemes. The number of border crossing points increased. Russian tourists began crossing the Finnish border for the first time. Before 1991, no more than 9000 Russian visitors crossed the border, but in 1996 this figure had surged past 170,000 and continued to grow.

=== Sweden ===
Resurgent Sweden and Russia clashed a number of times over the centuries. Most of the battles were fought on now-Finnish soil. The Treaty of Teusina concluded in 1595, ending a bloody guerrilla war between the two countries (known as the Long Wrath) that had raged for 25 years. Under the Treaty, the northern section of Finland's eastern border made a great leap eastwards, reaching the Arctic Ocean. Those drawing the new border knew that Finnish tribes had spread towards the east. The next redrawing came two decades later. Russia had been weakened by succession disputes and Sweden occupied large areas of Russia southeast of Finland, which were ceded to it in the Treaty of Stolbovo in 1617. As a result of its territorial gains, Sweden became one of the largest countries in Europe. For Karelians living in the areas now under Swedish rule, the new border meant major changes. The Finnish–Swedish border was created in 1809 by the Treaty of Fredrikshamn, as Sweden ceded Finland to Russia. The course of the border was described in the fifth article of the treaty, without great detail. The borders were agreed to be the Sea of Åland, the Gulf of Bothnia, and the rivers Tornionjoki and Muonionjoki. Islands in the sea belonged to whichever country was nearest to them. At the mouth of the Tornionjoki river, Pirkko island, the harbor of Rosetta and the city of Tornio were agreed to belong to Russia. Along the rivers, the border was agreed to run along the deepest part of the river. The border ran up the Muonionjoki river and past Kilpisjarvi to Norway. The course of the border was amended in 1810 and small changes were later made. This process created caused sovereignty islands, which are physically in one country, but whose owners live in the other. The island of Märket was legally split in two parts in 1811. The border was agreed to run through the geographical center of the island in the Treaty of Åland in 1921 and in the treaty of continental plates in 1972. The Märket lighthouse, built in 1885 by Finland and operated by them, was left on the Swedish side. In 1981, the border on the island was modified into a curve to squeeze the lighthouse into the Finnish side.

=== Sea border ===
Some ports have border controls which must be visited by boats arriving from countries outside the Schengen Area. The following border controls exist for boats: Santio, Haapasaari, Helsinki, Hanko, Åland, Saimaa Canal.

Border controls on land exist only on the Russian border. See Finland–Russia border. The only permanent border control on airports is on the Helsinki airport (although occasional controls can take place for charter flights on other airports).

== Gallery ==
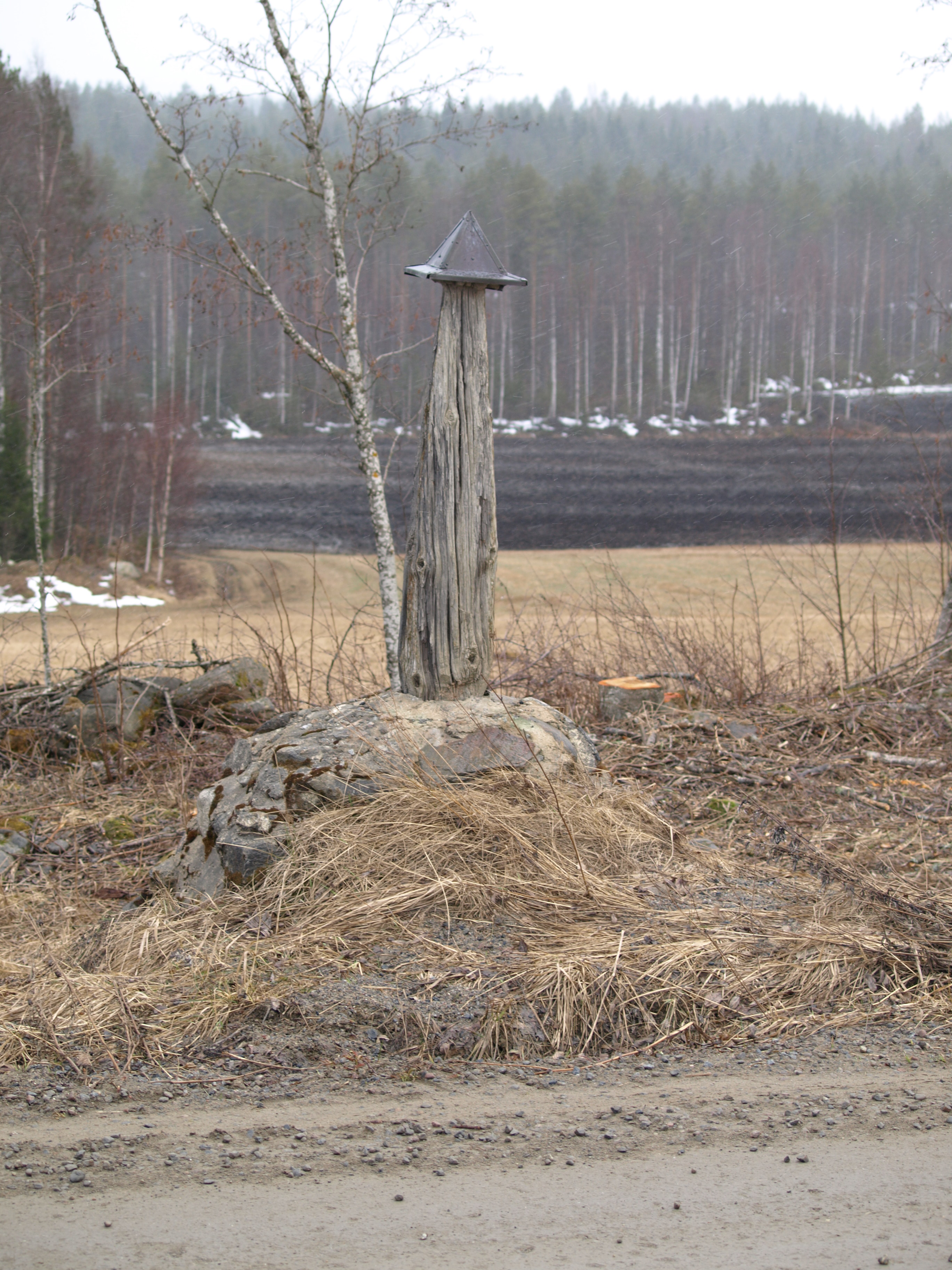
Treaty of Åbo boundary marker (1743-1809)

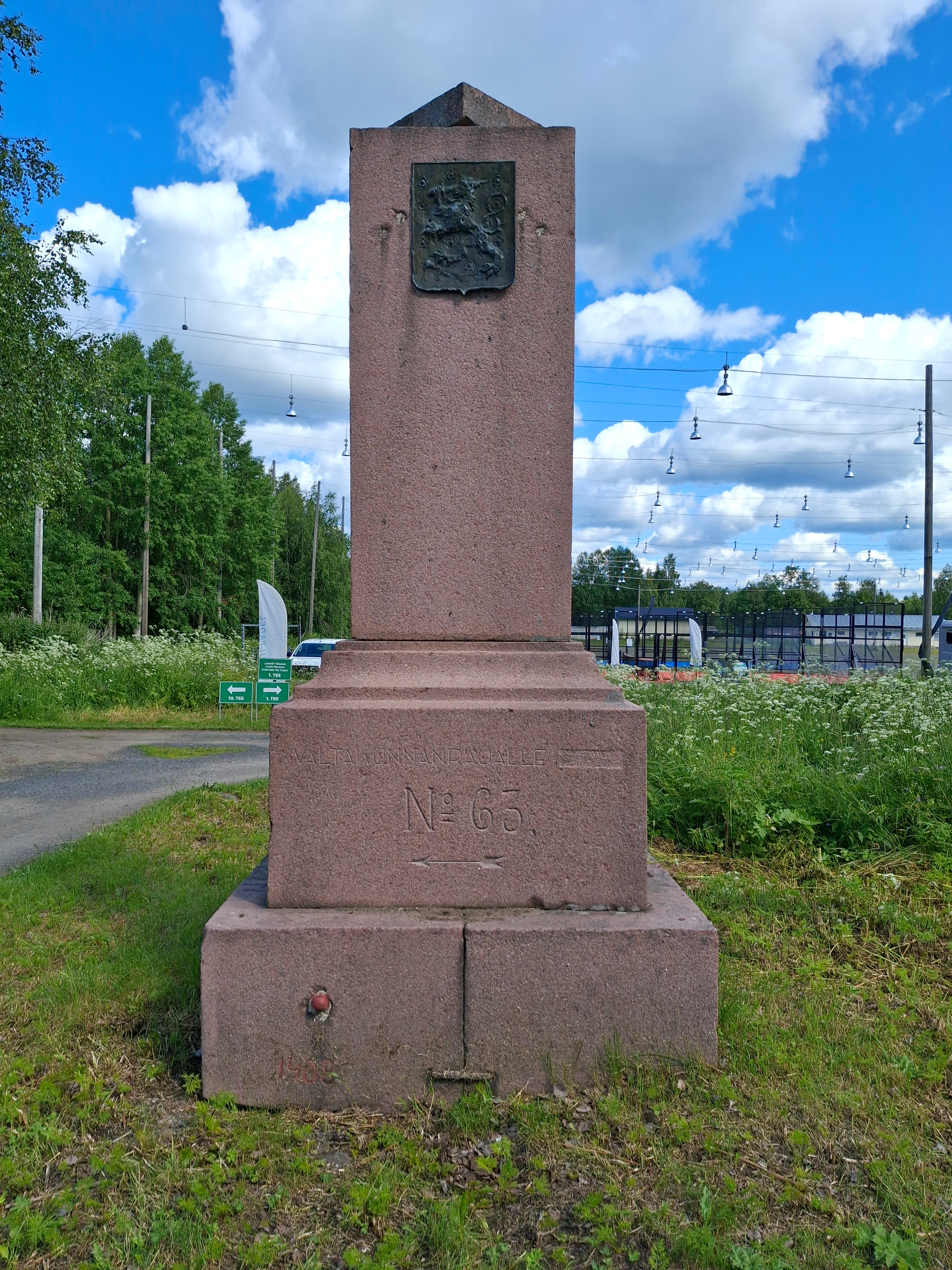
Boundary stone (1820s)

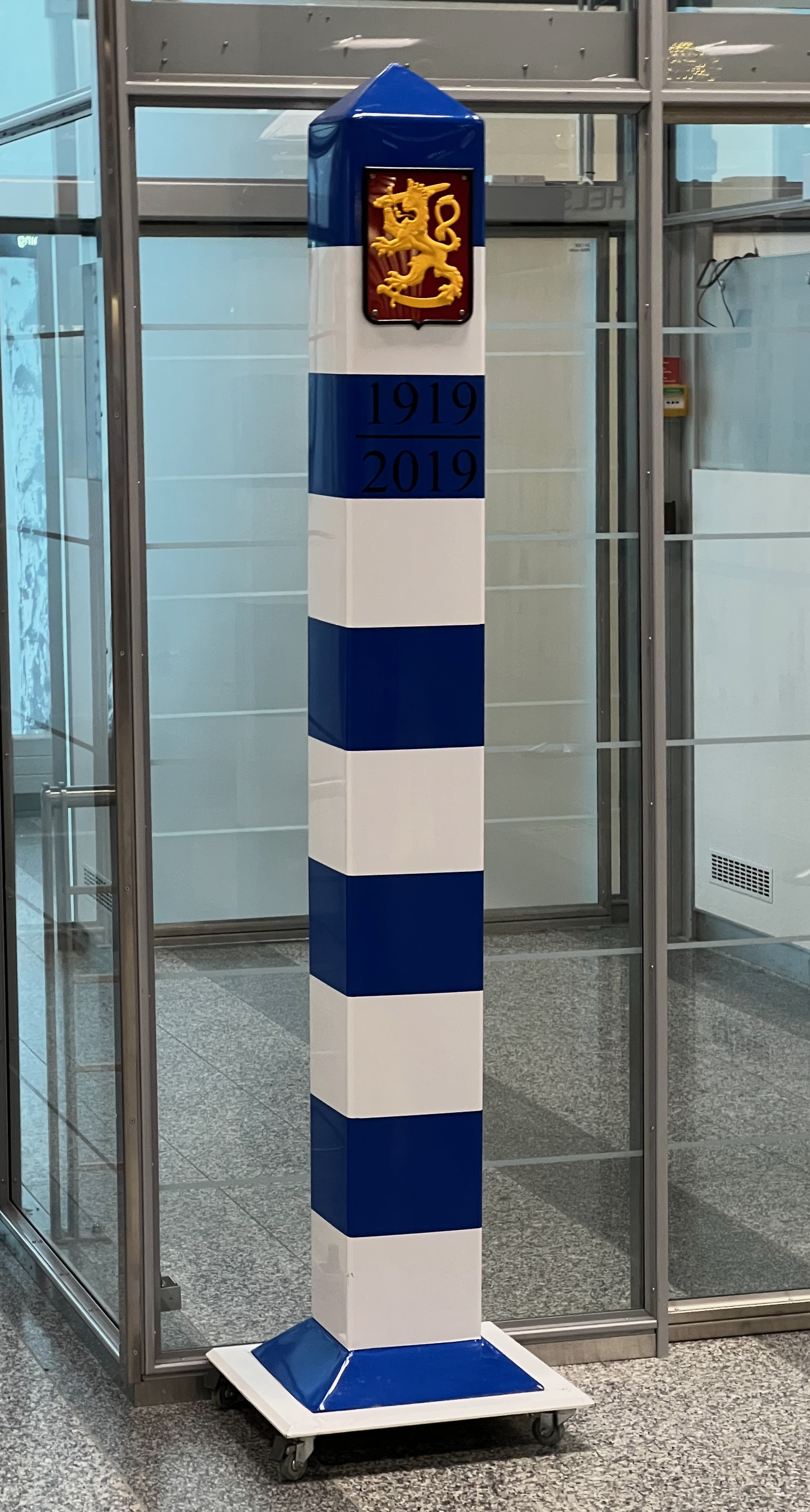
Current boundary marker

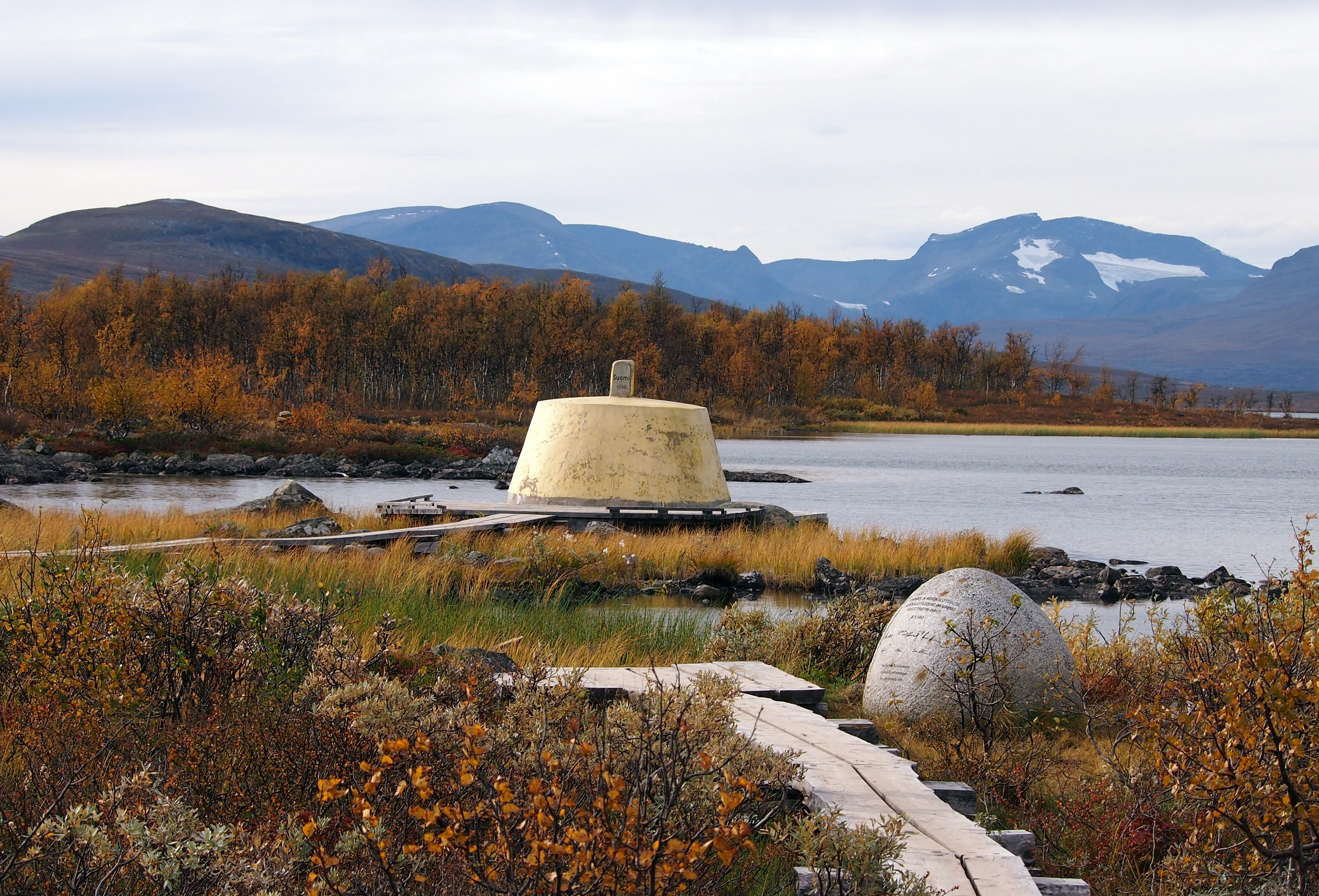
"Three-Country Cairn" on the boundary between Finland, Sweden and Norway

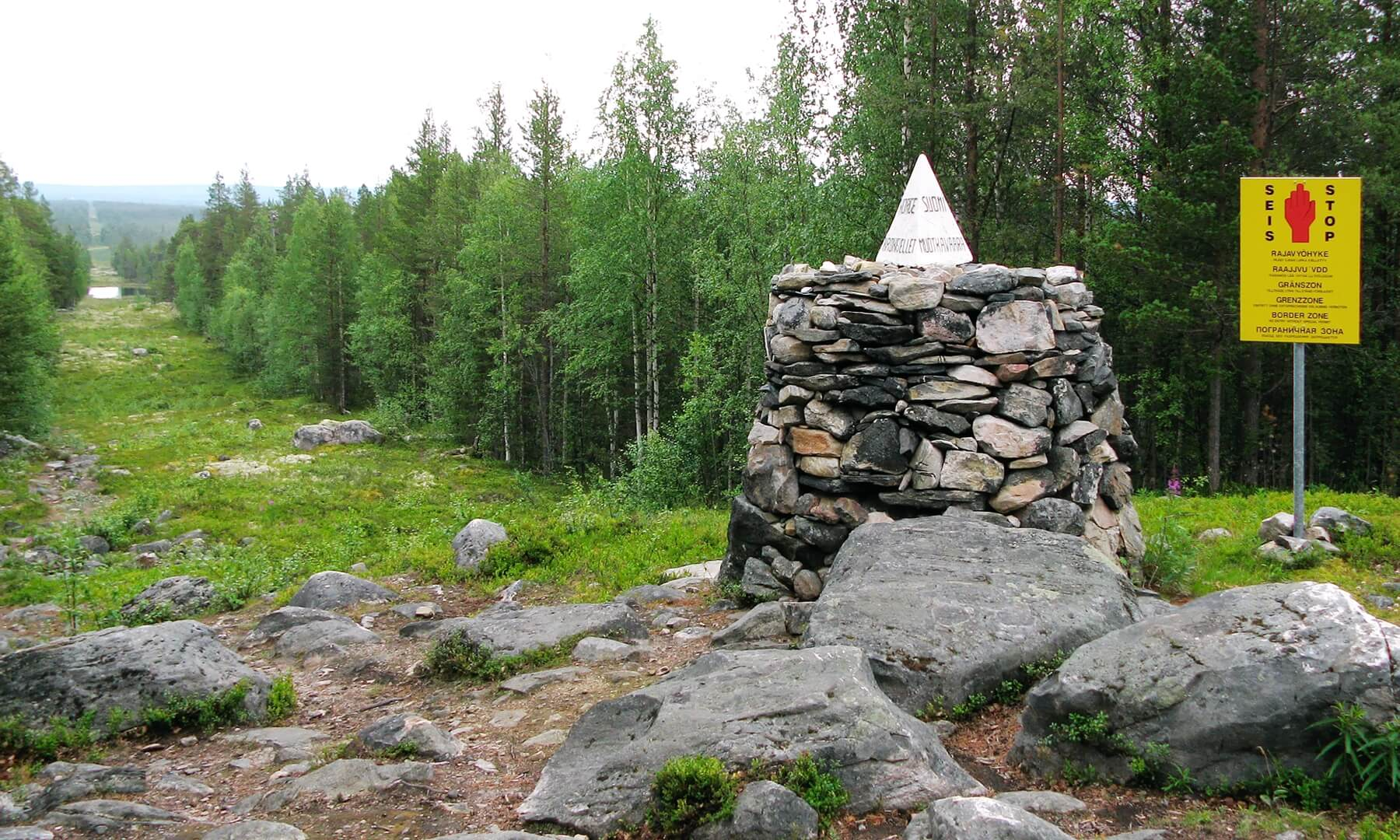
Treriksrøysa on the boundary between Finland, Norway and Russia

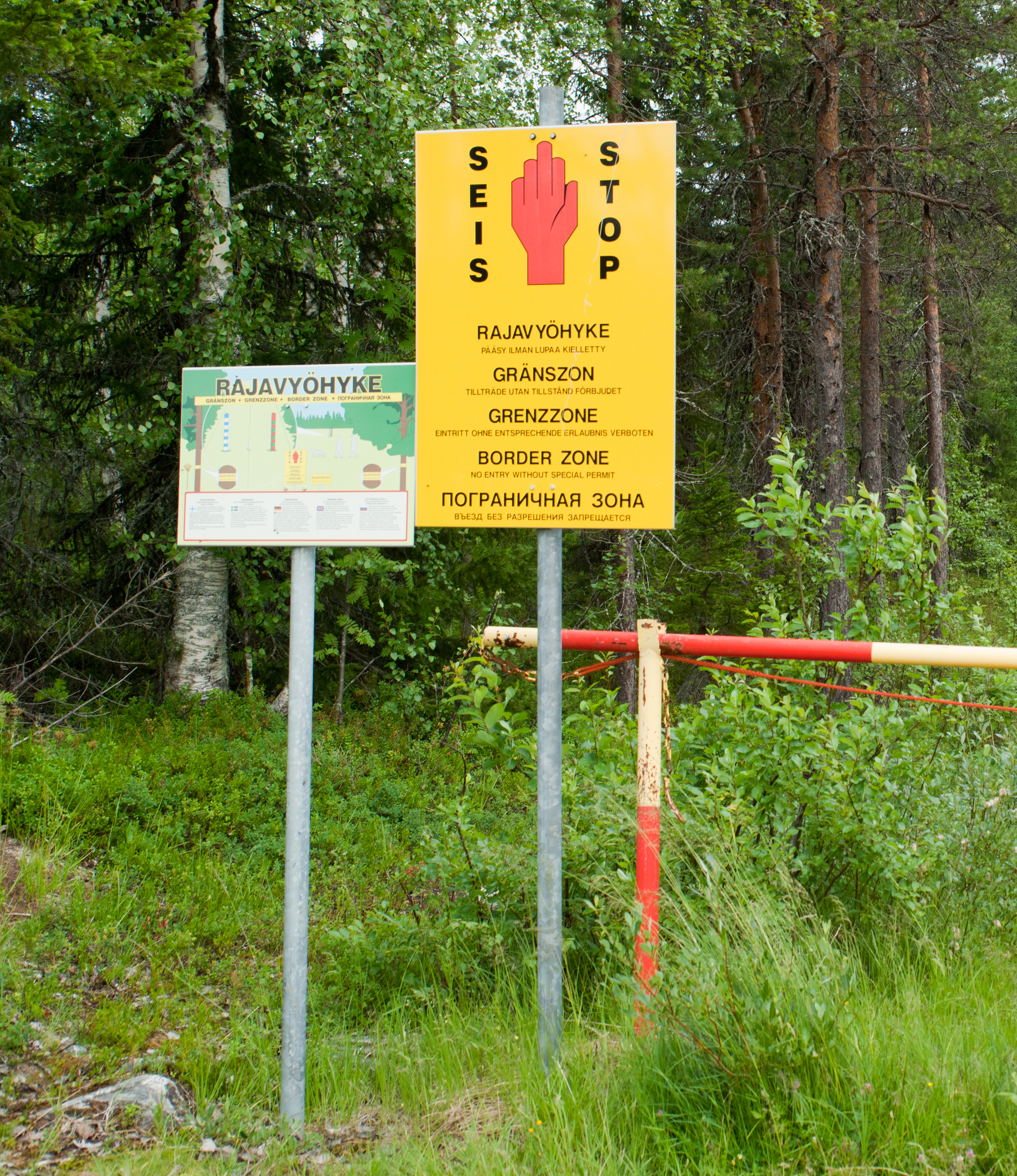
Border zone signs in Paljakka

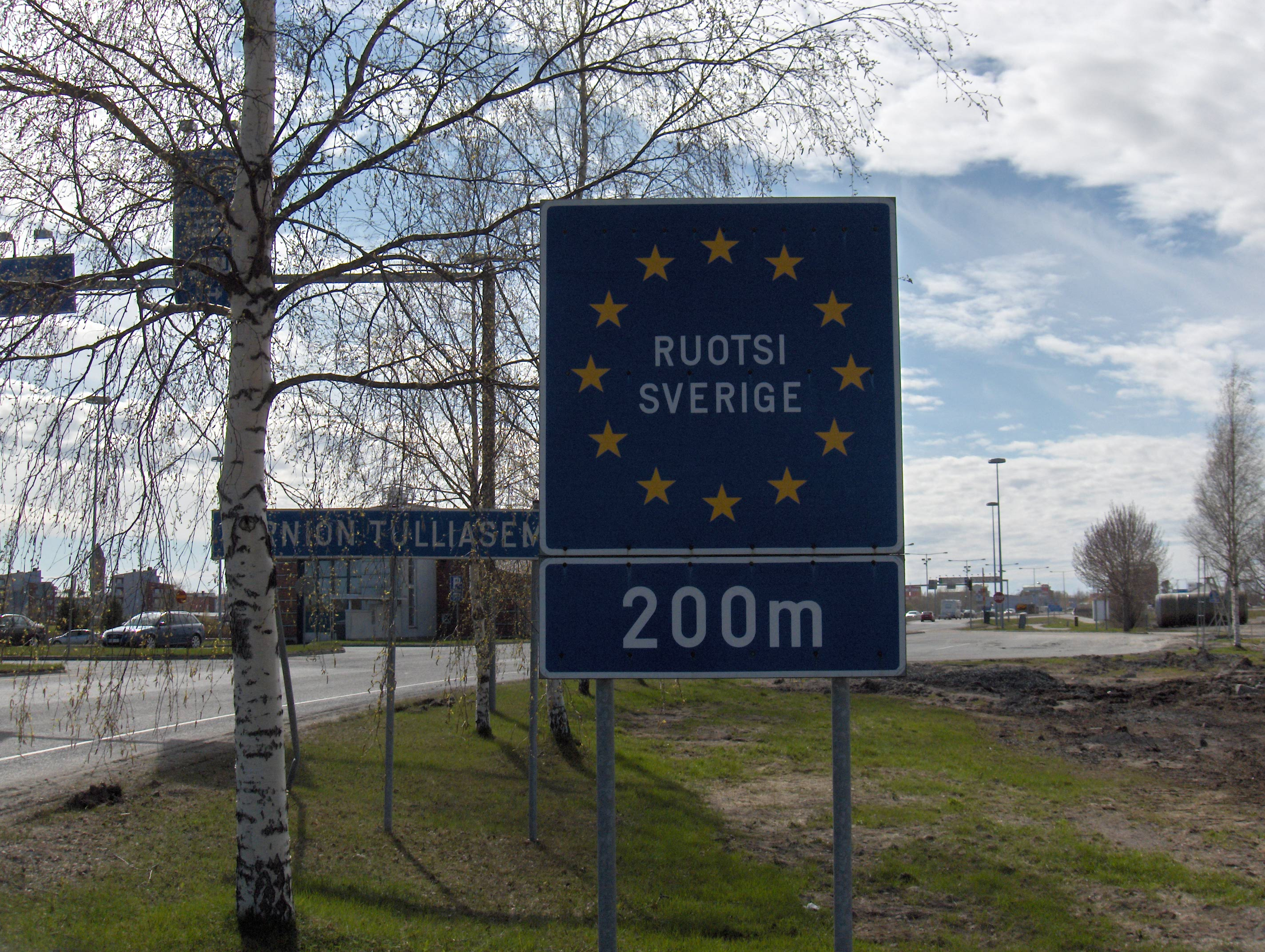
Bilingual Finnish/Swedish sign showing 200 metres until entering Sweden from Finland, Tornio customs station (Tornion tulliasema)

National border sign

Western National border sign (Swedish)

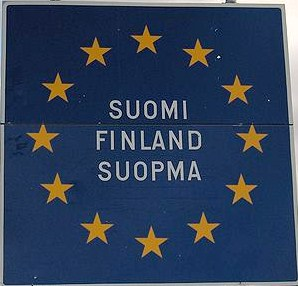
Northern National border sign (Sámi)

Eastern National border sign (Russian)
