= Lotta (river) =

Lotta, Lutto
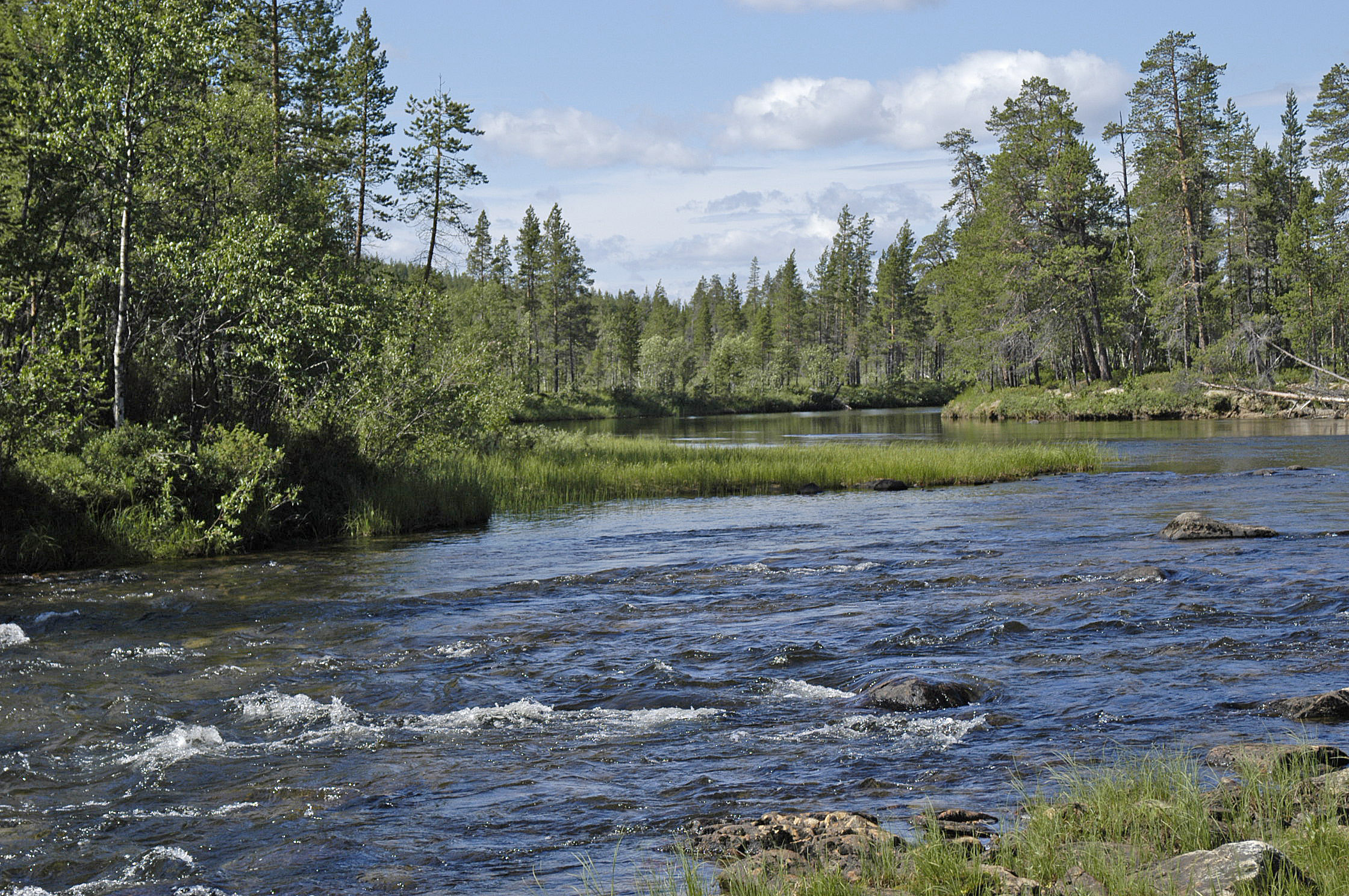
- Luttojoki in Inari, Finland
- Native name: Luttojoki (Finnish); Lotto (Northern Sami); Lått (Skolt Sami)

Location
- Countries: Finland; Russia

Physical characteristics
- Source
  - location: Saariselkä
- Mouth: Verkhnetulomskoye Reservoir
  - coordinates: 68.685°N 30.539°E
- Length: 190 km (120 mi)

Basin features
- Progression: Verkhnetulomskoye Reservoir→ Tuloma→ Barents Sea

The Lotta (Finnish: Luttojoki or Lutto, Northern Sami: Lotto or Lohttu, Skolt Sami: Lått, Russian: Лотта and Norwegian: Lotta) is a river that is part of the watercourse of the Tuloma. It flows through the eastern parts of the municipalities of Inari and Sodankylä in Finland and in the southern part of Pechenga in Murmansk Oblast, Russia. Before the Pechenga area was ceded to the Russians, the entire river was within Finland's borders.

The Lutto starts from a small lake, Lake Lutto, in the northern part of the village of Saariselkä. From there, the river flows eastward, occasionally hugging the border between Inari and Sodankylä. Near Raja-Jooseppi, it enters Russia, turns northeast and empties into the western side of the Verkhnetulomskoye Reservoir, which is drained by the river Tuloma. The river's most significant tributary on the Finnish side of the border is the Suomu.

Лотта is also a nickname for Russian road 47А-059.
