= Finland–Russia border barrier =

Border barrier in Finland

Finland-Russia border barrier
- Finland
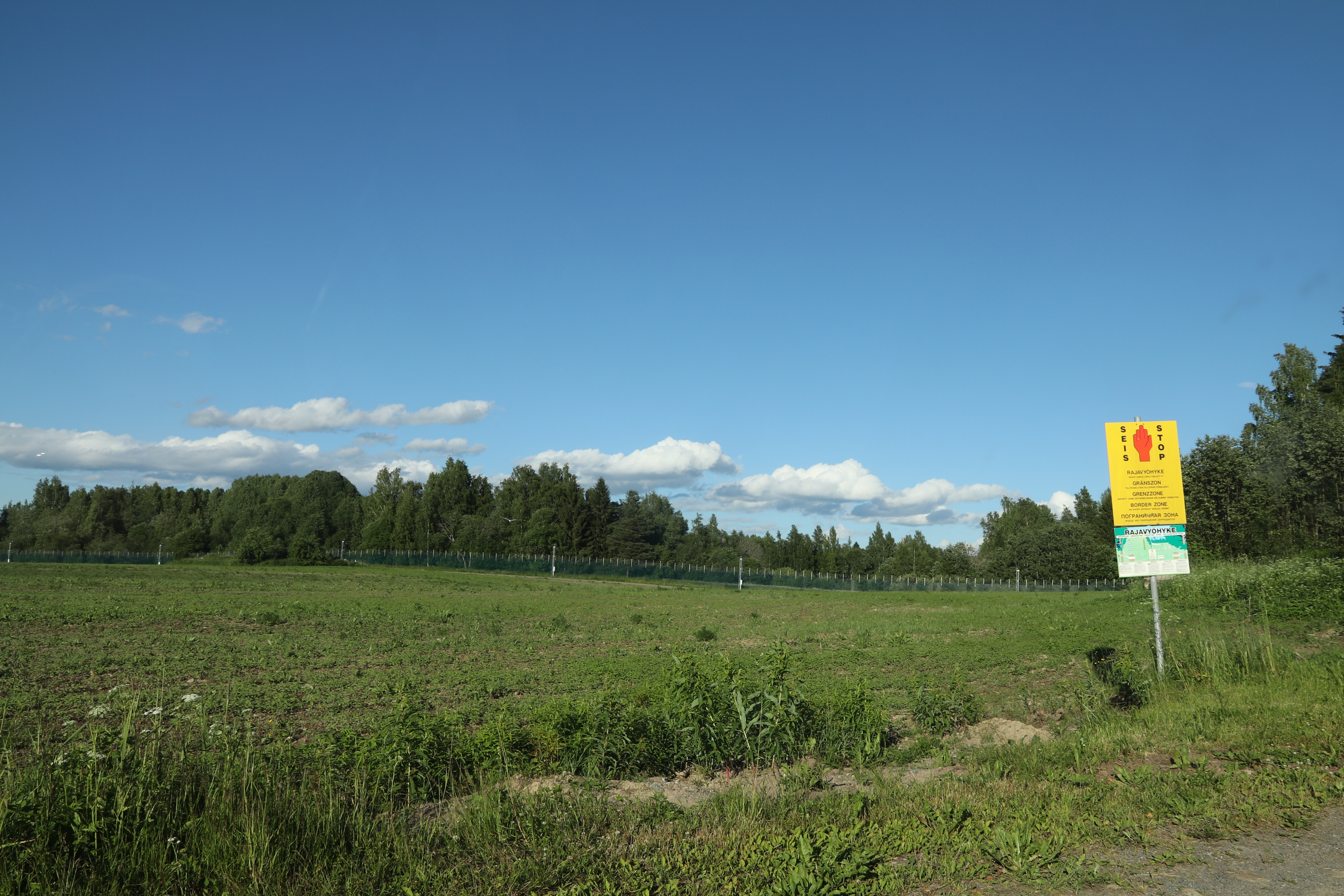

Site information
- Type: Border barrier
- Controlled by: Finland

Site history
- Built: September 2026

The Finland–Russia border barrier (Finnish: Itärajan esteaita, Swedish: Gränsstaket vid östgränsen) is a recently completed border barrier in Finland along the Finland–Russia border. The border barrier was built in response to the 2022 Russian Invasion of Ukraine by the Marin Cabinet, and gained increased popularity due to the use of migrants in hybrid warfare by the Russian Federation. The border barrier is 200 kilometres (120 mi) long, covering roughly 15% of the 1,340-kilometre (830 mi) border. The construction of the border barrier began in Imatra on 28 February 2023, and construction work was completed in September 2026.

The border barrier was built by the Finnish Border Guard, and the border barrier is equipped with razor wire and cameras. According to Finnish border authorities, the border barrier fence cost €356 million euros.

== Gallery ==
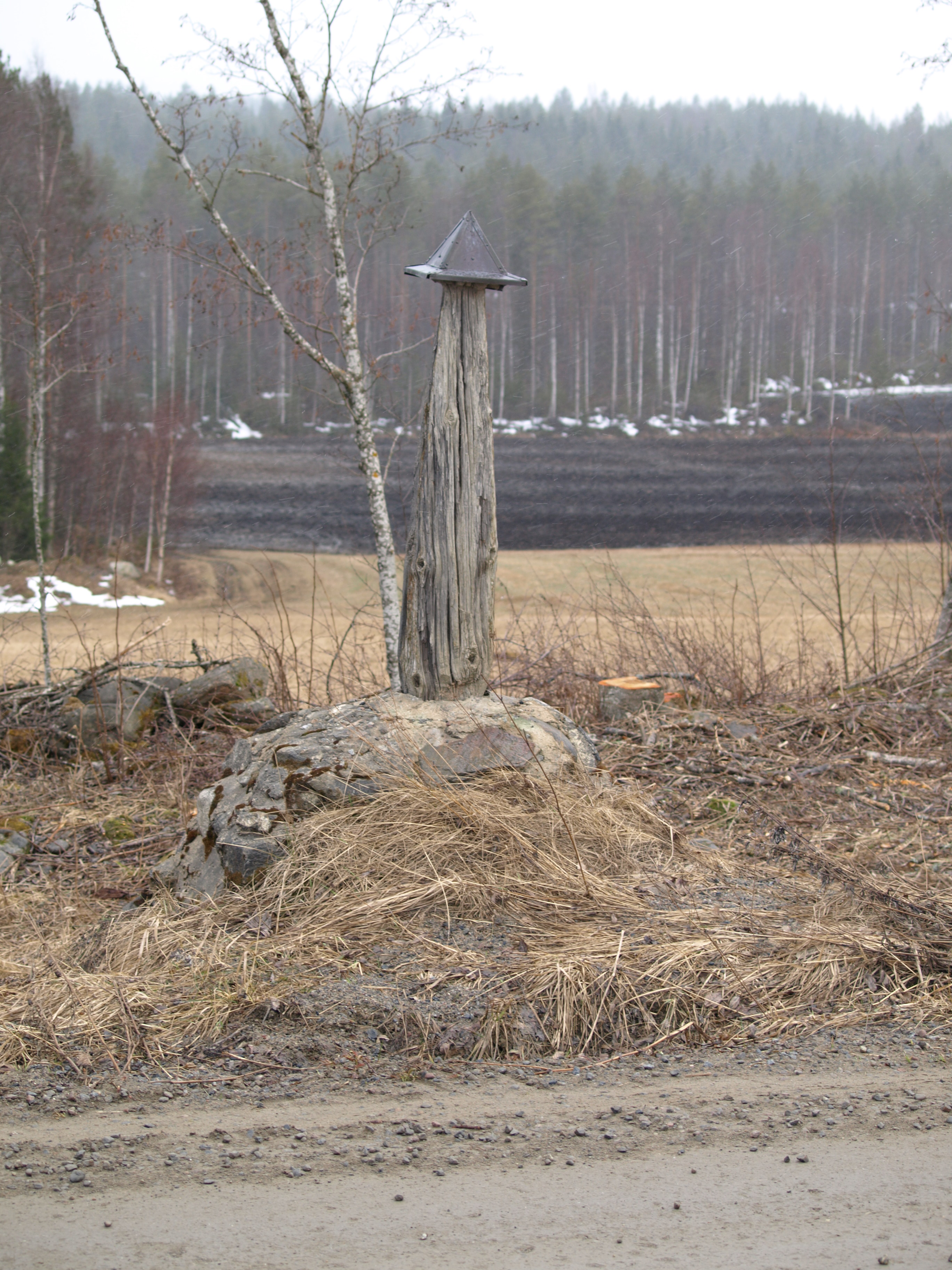
Treaty of Åbo boundary post (1743-1809)

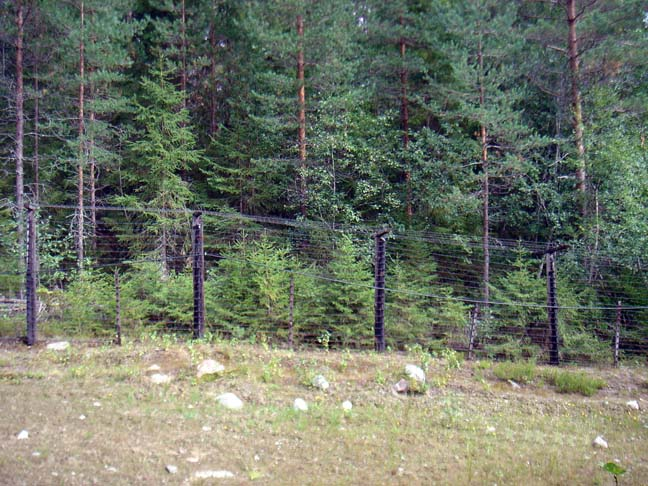
Old electric border fence (C-175 "Gardina") on the former Soviet side.

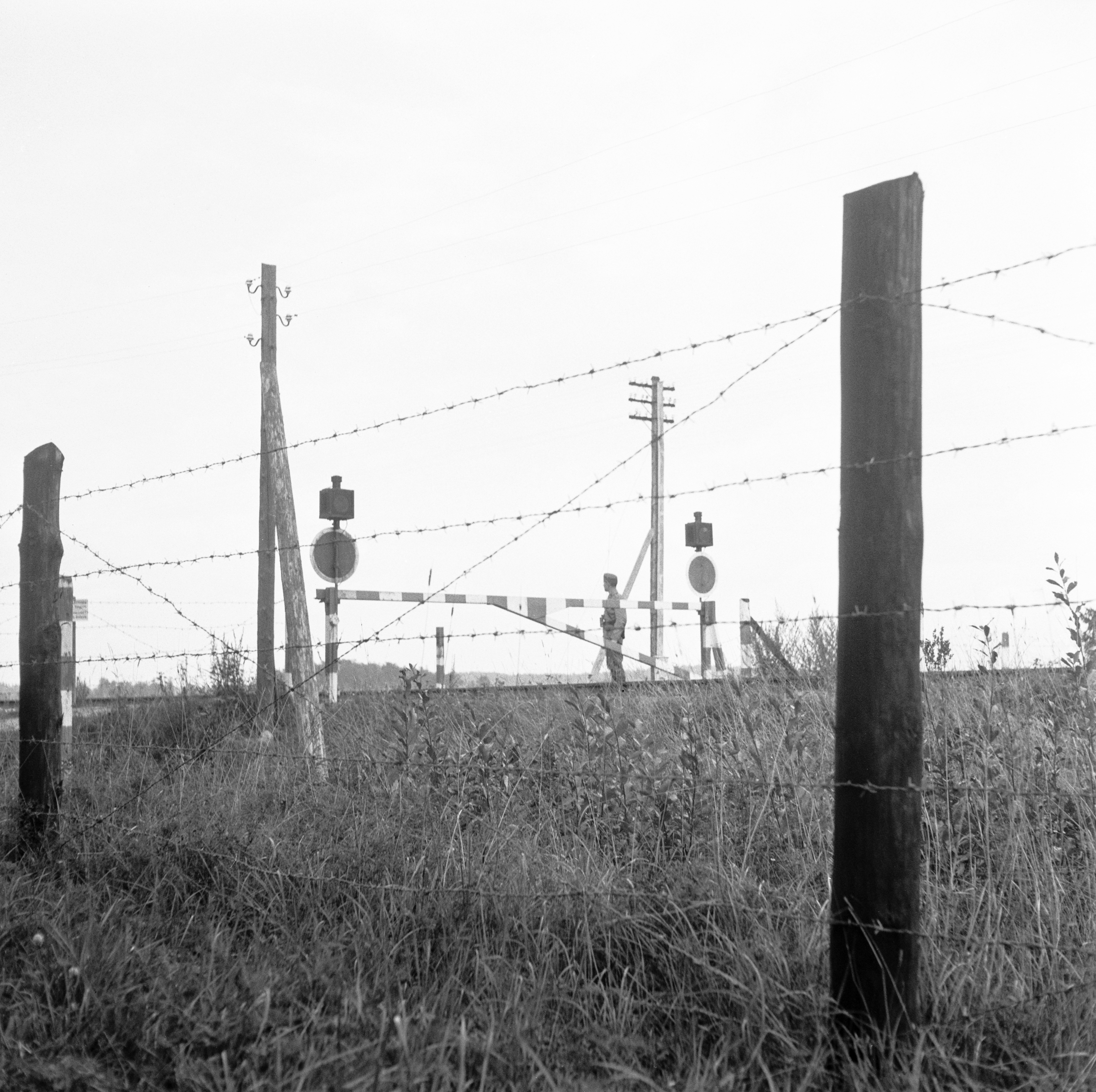
Old border barrier Porkkala border zone in 1953

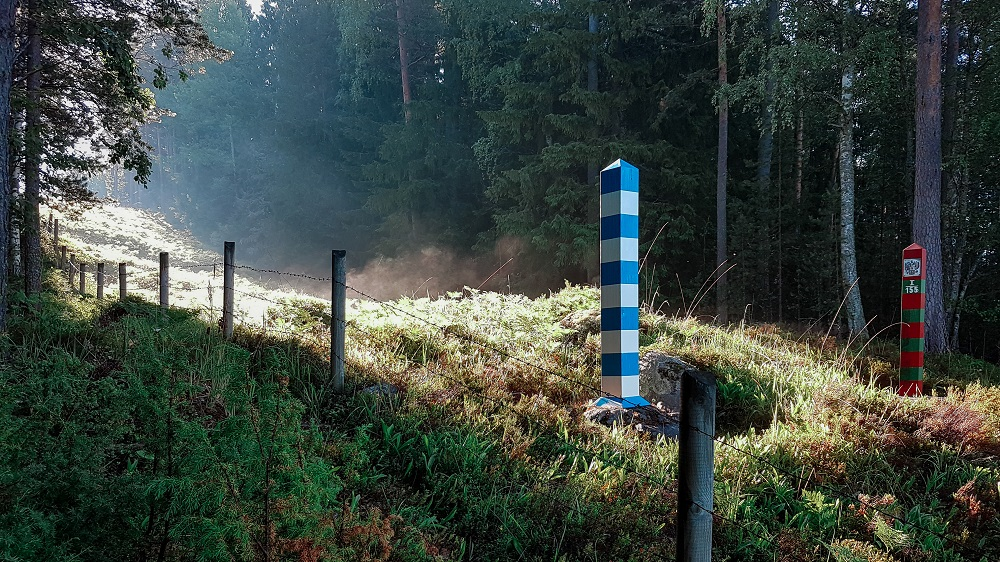
Former border fence

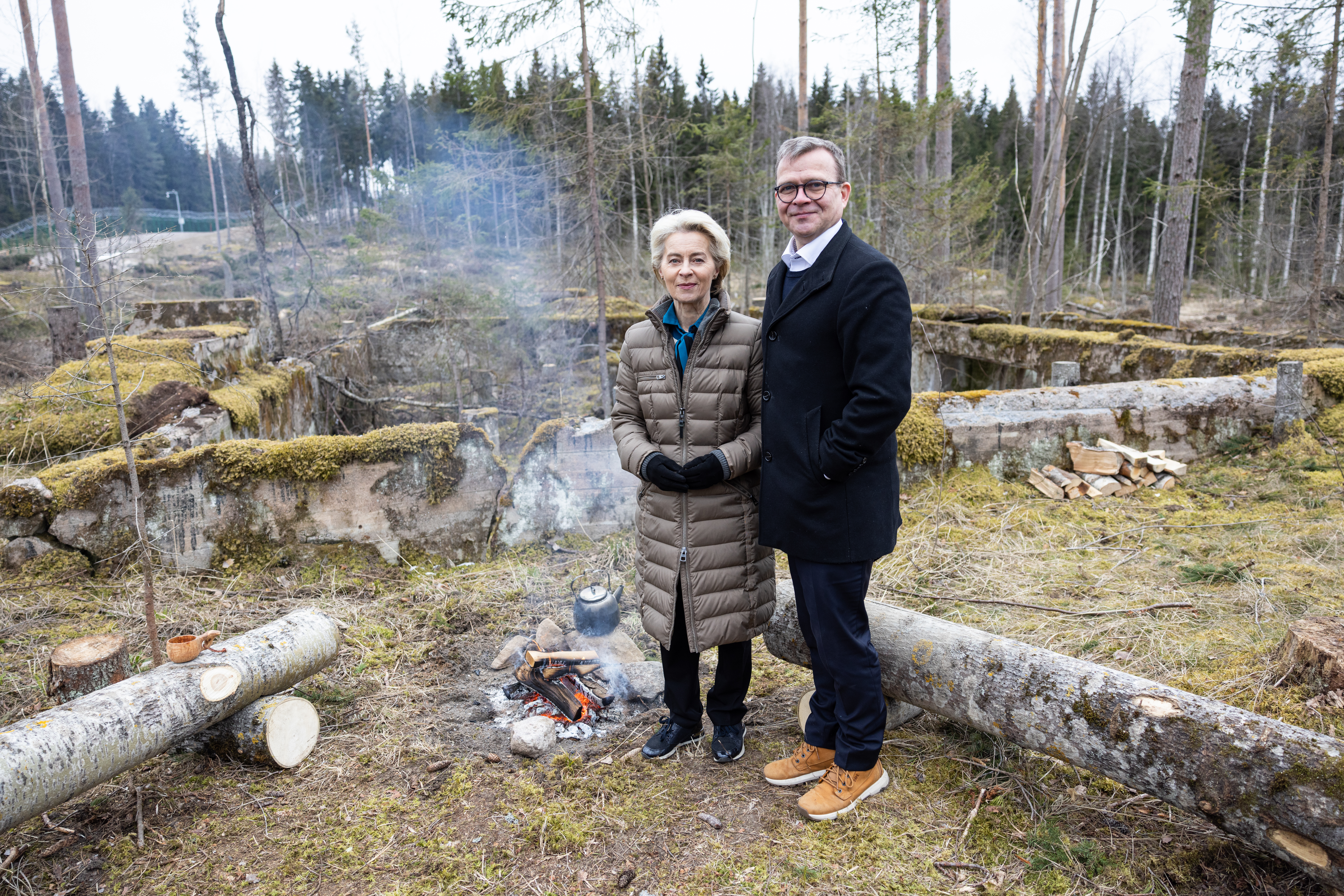
Petteri Orpo and Ursula von der Leyen near the new border fence (2024)

== See also ==
- Finland–Russia relations
