= Verkhnetulomskoye Reservoir =

Lake Notozero
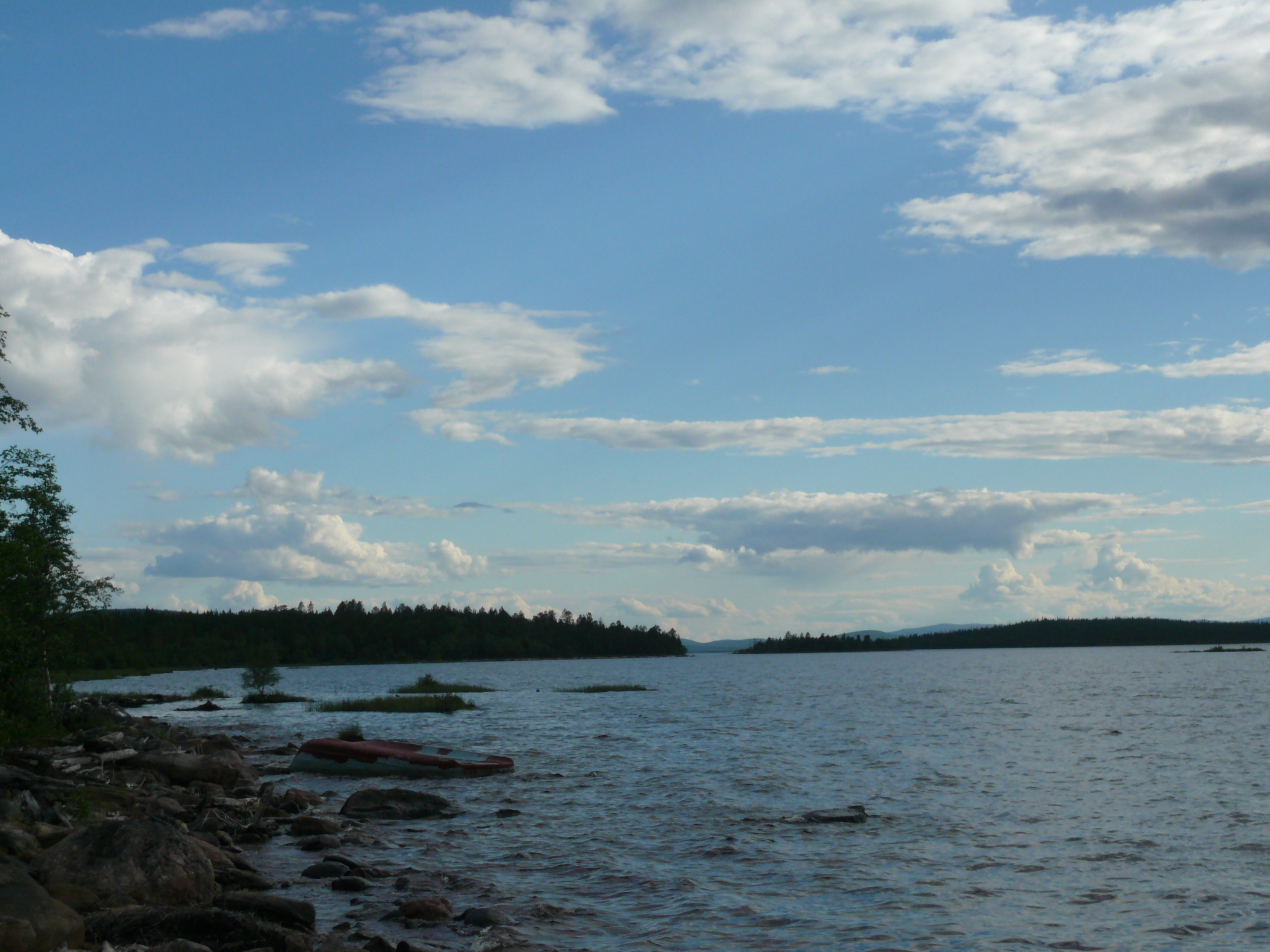
- Verkhnetulomskoye Reservoir

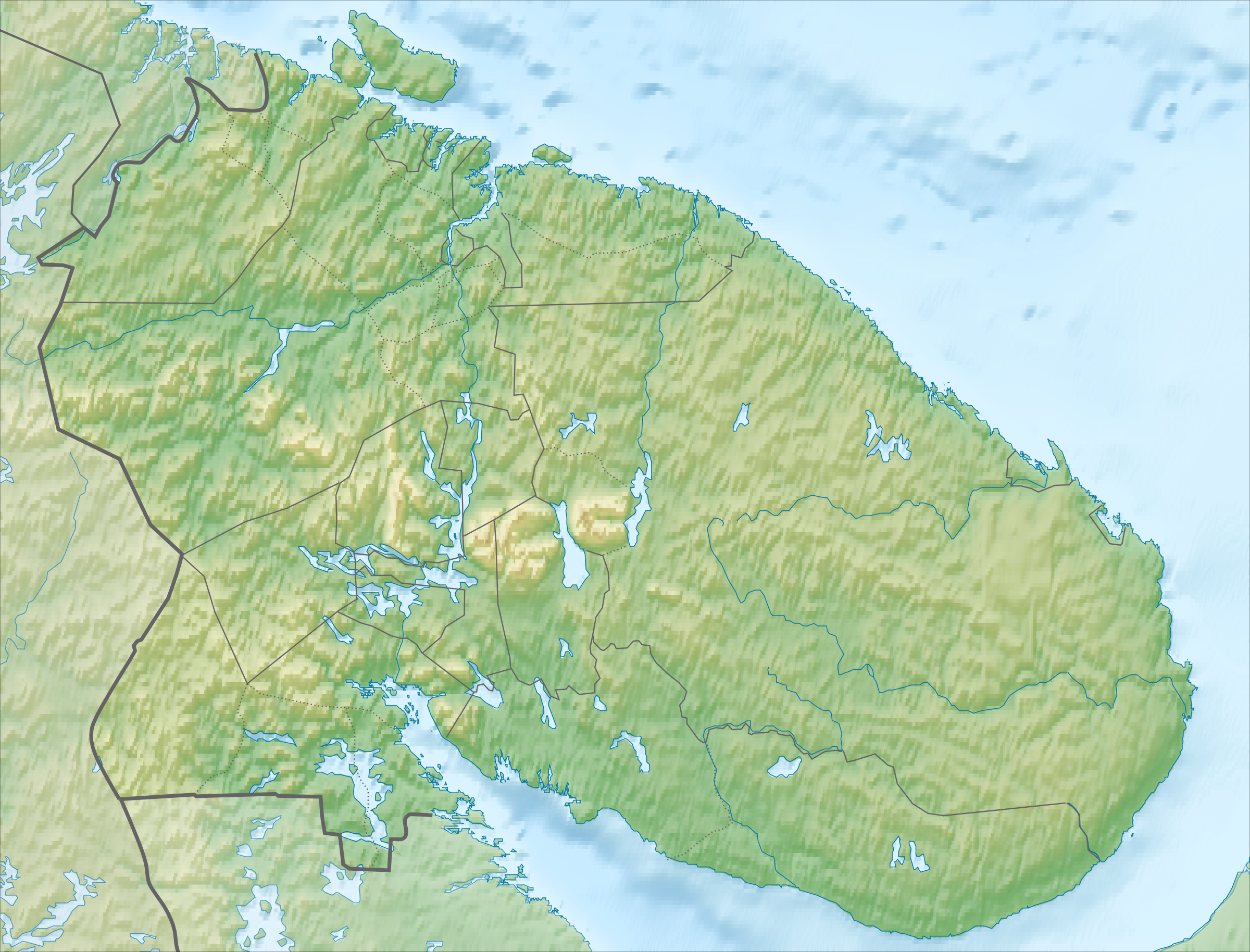
- Location within Murmansk Oblast
- Location: Kola Peninsula, Murmansk Oblast
- Coordinates: 68°35′N 31°12′E
- Lake type: Hydroelectric reservoir
- Primary inflows: Lotta, Nota, Vuva
- Primary outflows: Tuloma
- Basin countries: Russia
- Max. length: 85 km (53 mi)
- Surface area: 745 km^{2} (288 sq mi)

The Verkhnetulomskoye Reservoir (Russian: Верхнетуломское водохранилище) is a large reservoir on the Kola Peninsula, Murmansk Oblast, Russia. It impounds the river Tuloma. It was constructed in 1964-1965, and has an area of 745 km². Since the construction of the reservoir, the former Lake Notozero (Russian: Нотозеро; Skolt Sami: Njuõʹttjäuʹrr; Northern Sami: Njuohttejávri) has been submerged.
