= Small nucleolar RNA R12 =

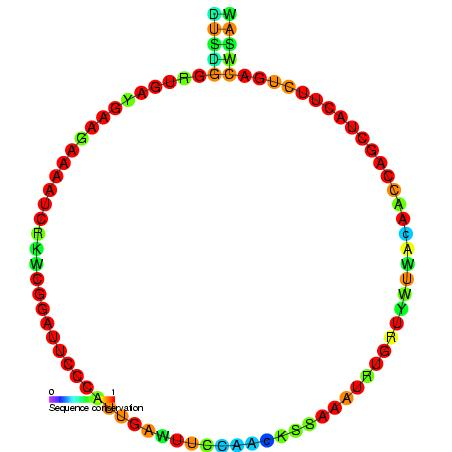
- Predicted secondary structure and sequence conservation of snoR12

Identifiers
- Symbol: snoR12
- Rfam: RF00204

Other data
- RNA type: Gene; snRNA; snoRNA; CD-box
- Domain: Eukaryota
- GO: GO:0006396 GO:0005730
- SO: SO:0000593
- PDB structures: PDBe

In molecular biology, Small nucleolar RNA R12 (also known as snoR12) is a non-coding RNA (ncRNA) molecule which functions in the modification of other small nuclear RNAs (snRNAs). This type of modifying RNA is usually located in the nucleolus of the eukaryotic cell which is a major site of snRNA biogenesis. It is known as a small nucleolar RNA (snoRNA) and also often referred to as a guide RNA.

snoR12 belongs to the C/D box class of snoRNAs which contain the conserved sequence motifs known as the C box (UGAUGA) and the D box (CUGA). Most of the members of the box C/D family function in directing site-specific 2'-O-methylation of substrate RNAs.

snoR12 was identified by computational screen of the rice Oryza sativa genome and is predicted to acts as a methylation guide for 25S ribosomal RNA in plants. snoR12 has been alternatively named snoZ44 in Arabidopsis thaliana and snoZ131 in rice.
