= Verkhnetulomsky =

Verkhnetulomsky Верхнетуломский
- Urban-type settlement
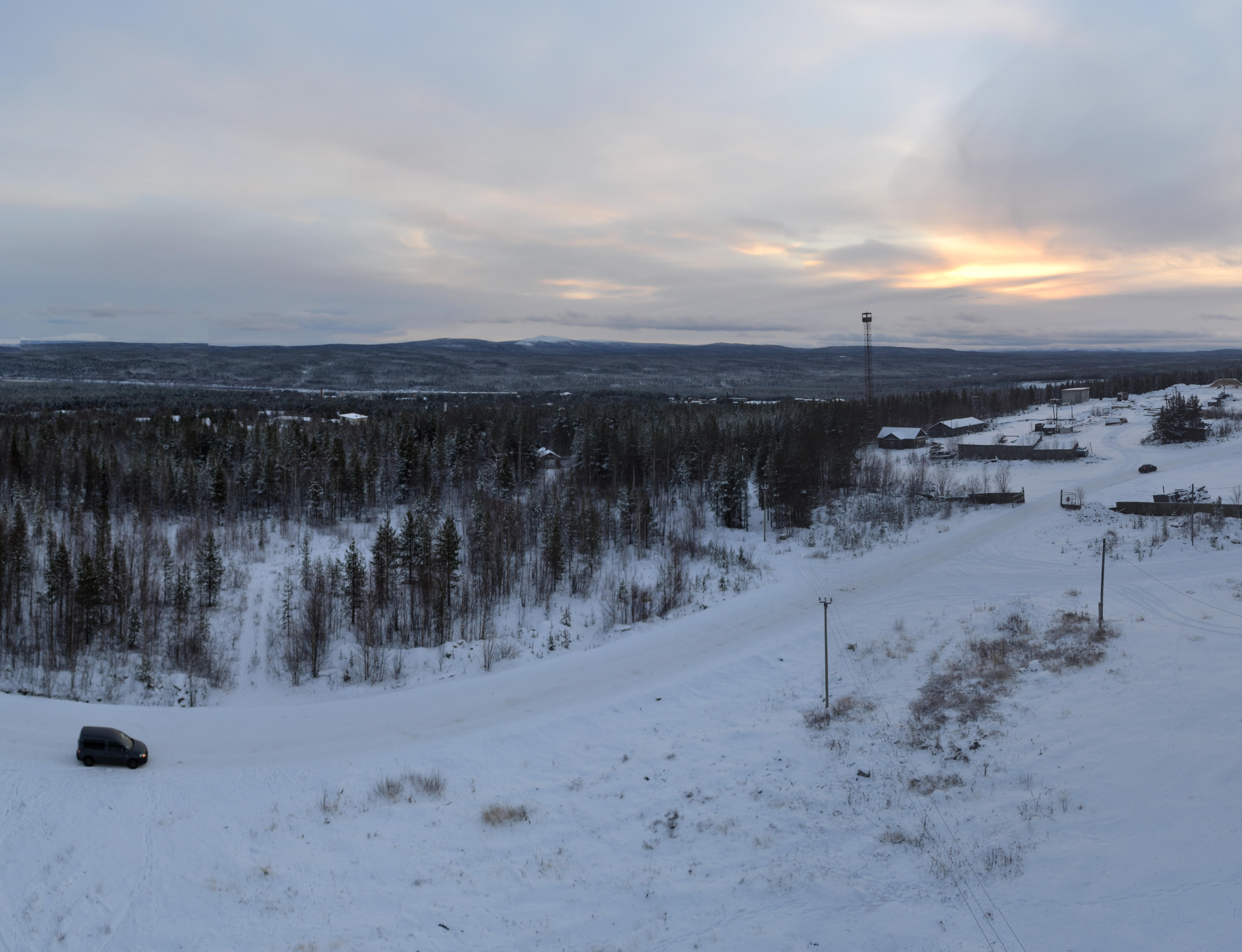
- View of Verkhnetulomsky. November 2015

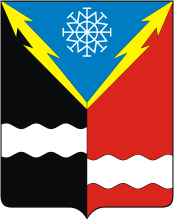
- Coat of arms
- Interactive map of Verkhnetulomsky
- Location of Verkhnetulomsky Verkhnetulomsky (Murmansk Oblast)
- Coordinates: 68°36′24″N 31°47′51″E
- Country: Russia
- Federal subject: Murmansk Oblast
- Administrative district: Kolsky District
- Elevation: 26 m (85 ft)

Population (2010 Census)
  - Total: 1,580
  - Estimate (2025): 1,173 (−25.8%)

Municipal status
  - Municipal district: Kolsky Municipal District
  - Urban settlement: Verkhnetulomsky Urban Settlement
- Time zone: UTC+3 (MSK)
- Postal code: 184374
- Dialing code: +7 81553
- OKTMO ID: 47605154051

Verkhnetulomsky (Russian: Верхнетуло́мский) is an urban locality (an urban-type settlement) in Kolsky District of Murmansk Oblast, Russia, located on the Kola Peninsula on the upper Tuloma River, 60 kilometers (37 mi) southwest of Murmansk. Population: 1,580 (2010 census); 2,003 (2002 census); 2,797 (1989 Soviet census).

It was founded as a work settlement around 1961.
