= Tuloma (rural locality) =

Tuloma Тулома
- Selo
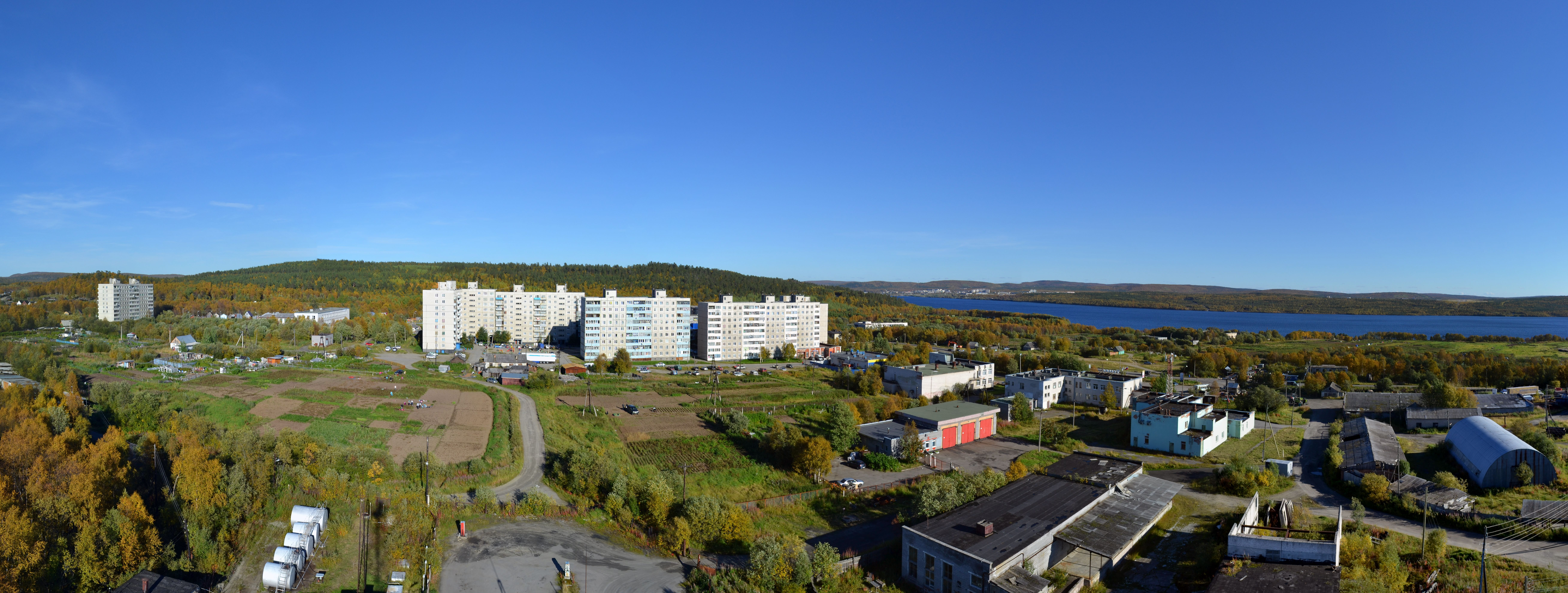
- Interactive map of Tuloma
- Location of Tuloma Tuloma (Murmansk Oblast)
- Coordinates: 68°49′N 32°42′E
- Country: Russia
- Federal subject: Murmansk Oblast
- Administrative district: Kolsky District
- Territorial okrugSelsoviet: Tulomsky Territorial Okrug
- Founded: 1930
- Elevation: 20 m (66 ft)

Population (2010 Census)
  - Total: 1,991
  - Estimate (2021): 1,771 (−11%)

Municipal status
  - Municipal district: Kolsky Municipal District
  - Rural settlement: Tuloma Rural Settlement
- Time zone: UTC+3 (MSK)
- Postal code: 184362
- Dialing code: +7 81553
- OKTMO ID: 47605406101

Tuloma (Russian: Туло́ма) is a rural locality (a selo) in Kolsky District of Murmansk Oblast, Russia, located beyond the Arctic Circle at a height of 20 meters (66 ft) above sea level. Population: 1,991 (2010 Census).
