= Tuloma (river) =

Tuloma Finnish: Tuulomajoki, Northern Sami: Doallánjohka
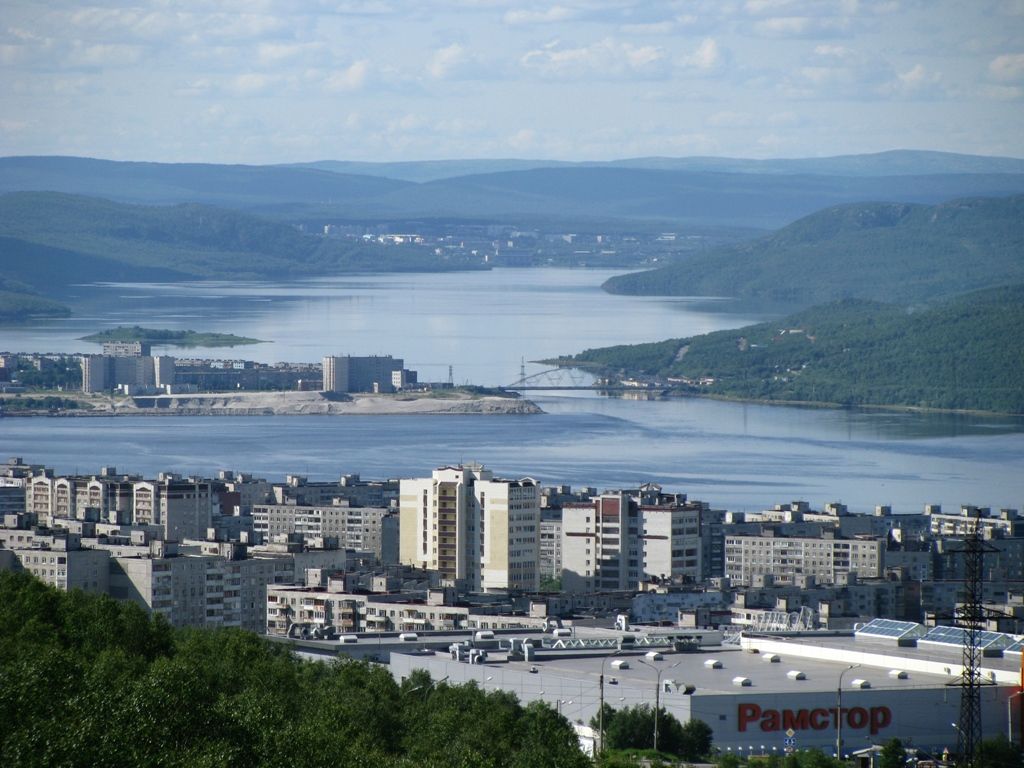

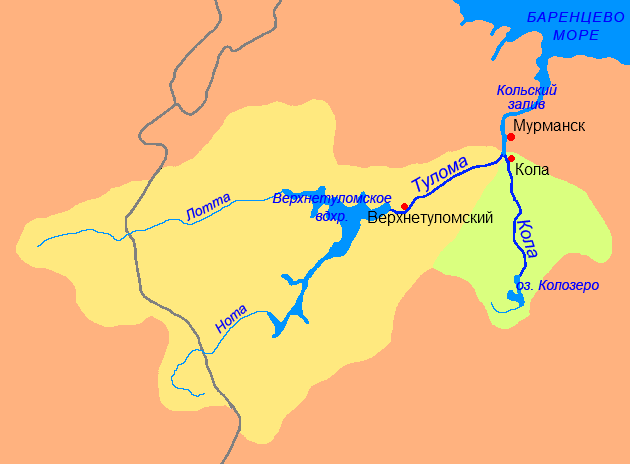
- Tuloma-Kola river basins. Tuloma in yellow
- Native name: Тулома (Russian); Tuloma (Russian); Tuållâmjokk (Skolt Sami)

Location
- Region: Murmansk Oblast, Russia

Physical characteristics
- Source: Verkhnetulomskoye Reservoir
- Mouth
  - location: Kola Bay, Murmansk Oblast, Russia
  - coordinates: 68.8891°N 33.0137°E
- Length: 64 km (40 mi)
- Basin size: 21,500 km^{2} (8,300 sq mi)
- Discharge
  - location: Kola Bay
  - average: 255 m^{3}/s (9,000 cu ft/s)

Basin features
- Tributaries
  - left: Lotta
  - right: Pecha, Ulita

The Tuloma (Russian: Тулома, romanized: Tuloma, Skolt Sami: Tuållâmjokk, Northern Sami: Doallánjohka and Finnish: Tuulomajoki) is a river in Murmansk Oblast in Russia. With a drainage basin of 21,500 square kilometres (8,300 sq mi) and an average discharge at 255 m^{3}/s, the Tuloma is one of the biggest rivers in northern Fennoscandia.

The river has its sources in the Saariselkä mountains in the eastern parts of the Lapland region in Finland. The Tuloma itself is formed by the confluence of the rivers Lotta and Nota rivers in the Verkhnetulomskoye Reservoir (formerly Lake Notozero). Its outflow is in the Kola Bay, at the confluence with the river Kola and 10 kilometres (6 mi) south of Murmansk in the Kola Peninsula in Russia.

== Hydro Power development ==
There are two hydroelectric power stations on the Tuloma. The Lower Tuloma was finished in 1938, and is located at the town of Murmashi, close to the rivers outflow into the Kola Bay. The dam raised the river by 19 metres (62 ft), and the resulting reservoir was 60 kilometres (37 mi) long.

The second and largest power plant, the Upper Tuloma, was built in the 1960s at Verkhnetulomsky, 60 kilometres further upriver. A 62-metre (203 ft) high dam was constructed below the outflow from Lake Notozero, forming the large Verkhnetulomskoye Reservoir 85 kilometres (53 mi) long and up to 20 kilometres (12 mi) wide.

| Hydroelectric Plant | Year built | Head | Capacity | Avg. annual production |
|---|---|---|---|---|
| Lower Tuloma | 1934–38 | 19 m | 56 MW | 250 GWh |
| Upper Tuloma | 1961–66 | 62 m | 268 MW | 800 GWh |

== Fishing ==
The Tuloma used to be a great salmon river, on a par with the famous Tana River in Norway in productivity, with annual catches in excess of 100 tons. At Padun Falls at the outflow from Lake Notozero the Skolt Sami had rights to catch salmon in a large weir, and every year tens of tons of salmon was caught at this site alone.

When hydro power plants were built the salmon spawning grounds and migration routes were destroyed. At the first power plant, the Lower Tuloma, a fish ladder was built. Within a few years salmon catches soon approached their former levels. When the Upper Tuloma plant and a dam at Verkhnetulomskiy were built the salmon stock collapsed. Lake Notozero became part of the large Verkhnetulomskoye reservoir, and the Padun Falls was gone. A fish lift was built at the dam, but it did not work and was closed down after a short time. There remains, however, a small salmon stock in the Toluma, spawning in the tributaries below the dam, especially in the Pecha. (tuulomajoki.fi)

There is a project under way to ascertain whether it is possible to reestablish the salmon to the river, by allowing the fish to pass the dams and thus reaching spawning grounds in the tributaries above the reservoirs, which are still in their natural state. It is hoped that this will bring substantial benefits to the region, through recreational fishing and eco-tourism. (Tuloma River Project)
