= Finland–Russia border =

International border

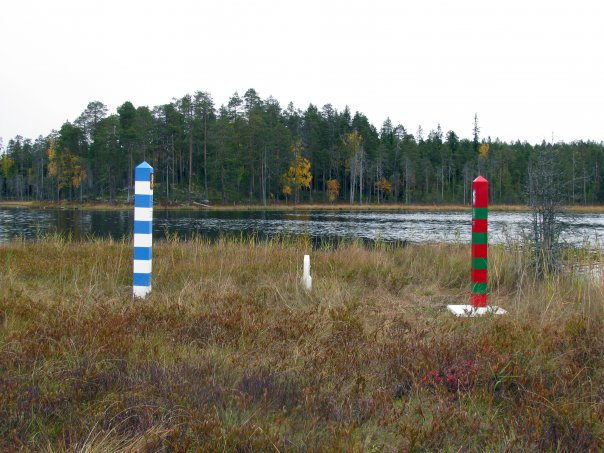
- Finnish (blue–white) and Russian (red–green) boundary marks at the easternmost point of Finland, in Ilomantsi

Characteristics
- Entities: Finland; Russia
- Length: 1,340 km (833 mi)

History
- Established: 1809 (internal), 1917 (international); Diet of Porvoo, Finnish Declaration of Independence
- Current shape: 10 February 1947; Paris Peace Treaties
- Treaties: Treaty of Tartu; Soviet–Finnish Non-Aggression Pact; Moscow Peace Treaty; Moscow Armistice; Finno-Soviet Treaty

Finnish and Russian boundary markers

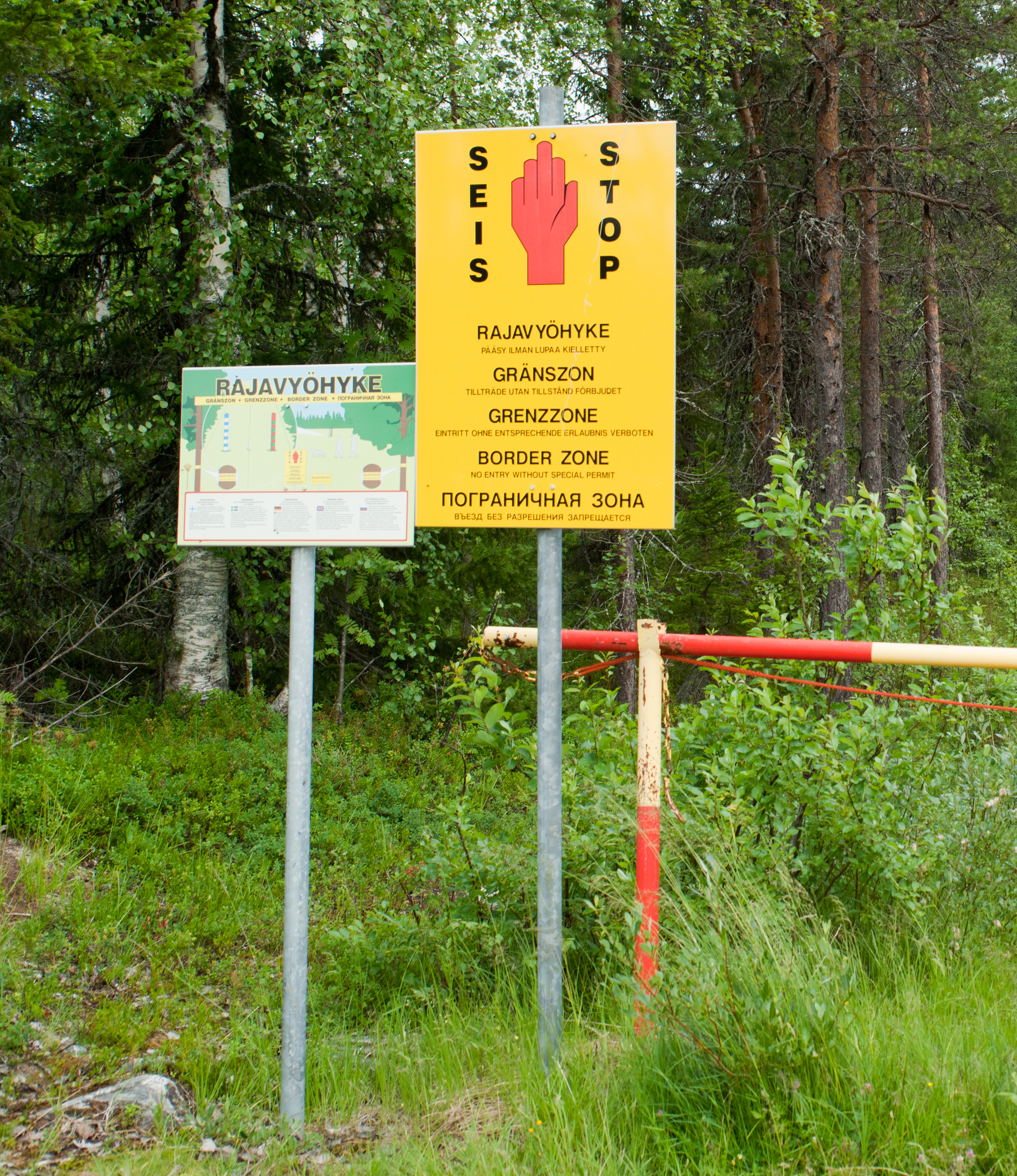
Border zone signs in Paljakka

The international border between Finland and Russia is 1,340 km (830 mi) long and runs approximately north to south, mostly through taiga forests and sparsely populated rural areas. It does not follow any natural landmarks, such as mountains or rivers. It is also an external border of the European Union and NATO.

It is patrolled by the Finnish Border Guard and the Border Guard Service of Russia, who also enforce border zones extending, respectively, up to 3 km (1.9 mi) on the Finnish side and at least 7.5 km (4.7 mi) on the Russian side. A permit is required for entry to these border zones. Electronic surveillance on the Finnish side is concentrated most heavily on the southernmost 200 kilometers (125 miles). In addition, the Finnish Border Guard conducts irregularly scheduled dog patrols multiple times daily to catch illegal entries into the border zone. The border can be crossed only at official checkpoints, and at least one visa is required for most people. Major border checkpoints are found in Vaalimaa and Nuijamaa, where customs services on both sides inspect and levy fees on imported goods. In an attempt to curb a sudden increase in asylum seekers entering Finland via Russia, all border crossings were closed in late 2023.

The northern endpoint of the border between Norway, Finland, and Russia forms a tripoint marked by Treriksrøysa, a stone cairn near Muotkavaara (69°03′06″N 28°55′45″E). On the south, the boundary is on the shore of the Gulf of Finland, in which there is a maritime boundary between the respective territorial waters, terminating in a narrow strip of international waters between Finnish and Estonian territorial waters.

== History ==
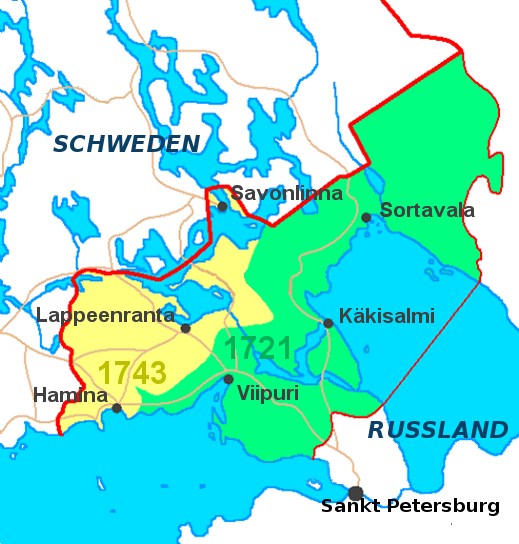
Old Finland, transferred to the Grand Duchy in 1812

=== Sweden–Russia border ===
The first treaty concerning the border was signed in Nöteborg in 1323 between Sweden (to which Finland belonged) and the Novgorod Republic. The Treaty of Teusina in 1595 moved the border eastward. As a result of the Ingrian War and the resulting Treaty of Stolbovo (1617), Sweden gained a large tract of land through the acquisition of the Nöteborg fortress, Kexholm and its large province, southwest Karelia and the province of Ingria. The Treaty of Nystad in 1721 and the Treaty of Åbo in 1743 moved the border westward.

The population of the border region was marked by religious differences, with the Russian side being predominantly Orthodox, while the Swedish side was initially Catholic, and later, Lutheran Protestant. After the peace of Stolbovo in 1617, the Orthodox population faced persecution and many fled to the Russian side or converted to Lutheranism. The displaced population was largely replaced by immigrants from Finland, most of whom were Savonians who spoke Finnish instead of the closely related Karelian.

=== Border of the Grand Duchy of Finland ===
After the Finnish War, the Treaty of Fredrikshamn transferred Finland from Sweden to the Russian Empire with the establishment of the Grand Duchy of Finland, an autonomous state ruled by the Russian Emperors. In 1812, the Vyborg Governorate, also known as "Old Finland", was incorporated into the new Grand Duchy.

A customs border was set up between the Grand Duchy and Russia, making Finland its own customs territory. The Finnish Customs Department was officially established on February 18, 1812. The customs border was primarily for Russia's benefit, but it gave Finland the crucial ability to use its own customs revenue and set its own tariffs. By the early 20th century, customs had become the Grand Duchy's most significant source of tax revenue, accounting for about three-quarters of state income. Efforts to unify the Finnish and Russian customs services and remove the border failed due to internal Russian turmoil in the early 1900s.

The first national atlas of Finland, Suomen kartasto, was published during the period of Russification in 1899. On the map, the border with Russia was intentionally drawn in a similar style to the borders with Sweden and Norway to emphasize Finland's distinct status as a separate entity from Russia. The depiction of the border drew attention from the Governor-General of Finland, the Russian representative in Finland, who sent a letter to the Senate and requested that the border between the Grand Duchy and Russia be marked differently from the national borders. In the 1910 edition of the atlas, this request was acknowledged by making a nearly imperceptible change to the width of the lines marking the borders with Sweden and Norway.

=== Finland–Soviet-Russia border ===
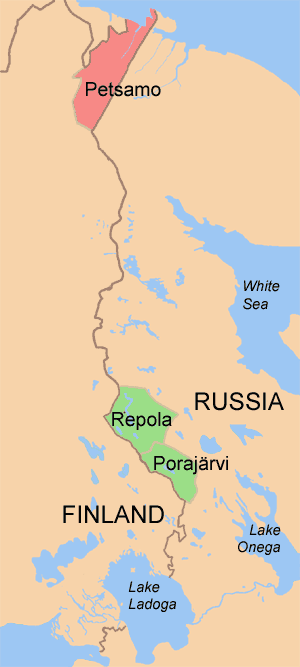
Treaty of Tartu in 1920: Repola and Porajärvi, occupied by the Finnish government, were returned to the Soviet Union, while Petsamo was gained by Finland.

In the period following Finland's declaration of full independence in 1917, during the Finnish Civil War and Russian Civil War, Finnish activists often crossed the border into Soviet territory in order to fight in the "heimosodat" wars surrounding Finnish ethnic self-determination and possible annexation into Finland. This ended in 1920 when the Russian–Finnish Treaty of Tartu in 1920 defined Finland as an independent country and established the border between the two countries. Despite this, Finnish fighters took part in the East Karelian uprising and Soviet–Finnish conflict of 1921–22. In 1922, the Finnish government closed the border to volunteers and food and munitions shipments.

=== Changes to borders with World War II ===
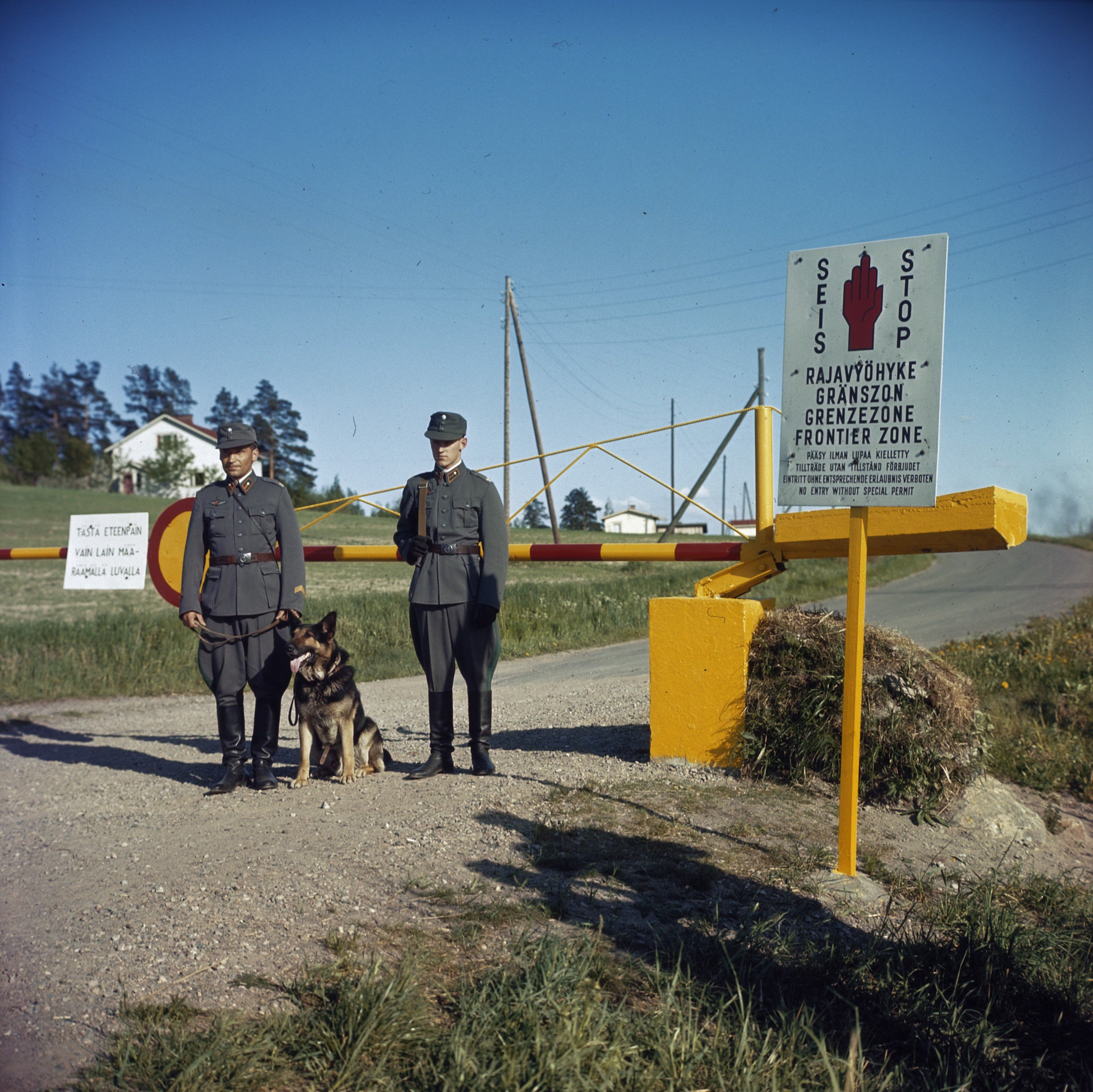
Border zone in 1967

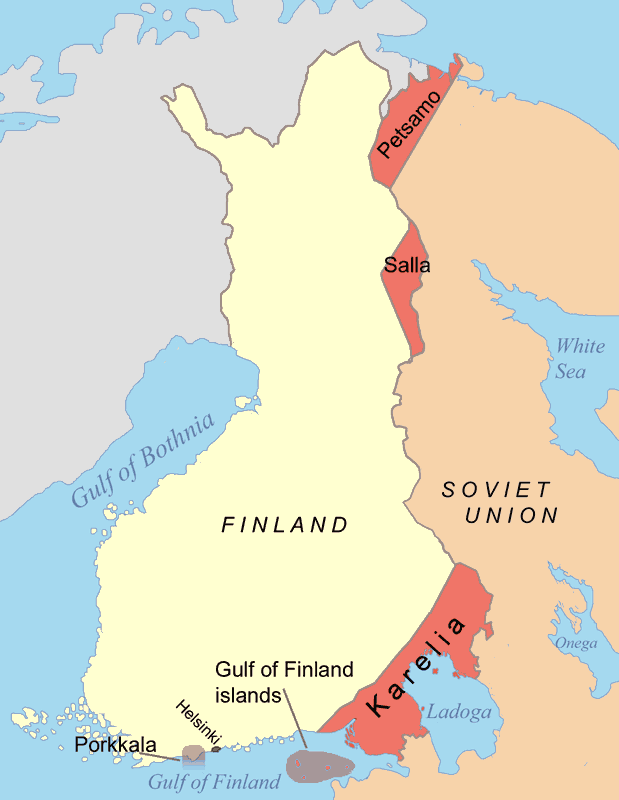
Territorial losses of Finland to Soviet Union in conclusion to World War II; Porkkala was returned in 1956.

In 1939, the Soviet Union invaded Finland in the Winter War, leading to the signing of the Moscow Peace Treaty the following year. The treaty had Finland cede several border areas to the USSR.

The naval border was established in 1940 and more accurately defined in 1965.

In 1940 and 1941, the Soviet Union rented Hanko Peninsula as a military base, thereby creating an additional border crossing leading to the exclave.

After the Continuation War (1941–44), the land border was demarcated in the Treaty of Paris (1947). As a result, approximately half of Finnish Karelia (including Finland's fourth-largest city Vyborg), parts of Salla, and all of Petsamo were ceded to the Soviet Union. The new border cut through what was previously Finnish territory, severing many rail lines and isolating many Karelian towns from Finland. The Soviet Union demanded the territories be emptied, and Finns were subsequently evacuated from the area and resettled in Finland. The areas that they left were then settled by Soviet immigrants.

In the Moscow Armistice signed in 1944 between Finland, the Soviet Union and the United Kingdom, a small peninsula towards the Gulf of Finland, Porkkala, was rented to the Soviet Union as a military base. This created in effect a southern border crossing to the Soviet exclave. Border crossings were in Luoma (checkpoint) and Tähtelä. In 1947, Finnish trains were allowed to pass through the base, but the passenger car windows were blacked out and the locomotives replaced while crossing through. Porkkala was returned to the Finnish government in 1956.

=== Soviet–Finnish border during the Cold War ===
During the Cold War, the border constituted part of the perimeter of the Iron Curtain. Crossing the border was not possible for much of its length. Only a very limited number of border crossing points existed, and the Soviet government permitted only escorted trips to select cities; border zones were off limits to tourists. There was little contact between cities that were relatively close to each other on opposite sides of the border, such as Imatra and Svetogorsk.

The Soviet side maintained extensive electronic systems and patrols to prevent illegal crossings. Soviet border surveillance began at a great distance from the actual border, and was as extensive as elsewhere along the Iron Curtain. The first surveillance systems were installed in railway stations in cities, where the militsiya monitored potentially suspicious traffic. The border zone began at 120 kilometres (75 mi) from the border. A special permit was required for entry, and the first line of control was equipped with electronic alarms. At 60 kilometres (37 mi), there was a raked sand strip (to detect footprints) and a thin alarmed tripwire. At 20 kilometres (12 mi), there was a 3 metres (9.8 ft) tall barbed wire fence, with a top that curved inwards towards their own territory to prevent Soviet citizens from leaving. The fence had an electronic alarm system. However, it was not protected underground and tunnelling under it was possible. At the international border, there was a border vista. On the Finnish side, there was a border zone where entry was allowed only with a permit. In Northern Finland, there was a reindeer fence intended to prevent privately owned reindeer from crossing, but this was not designed as an obstacle to persons. Since Finland was a neutral country for most of the Cold War, they did not protect illegal border crossers and instead returned them to the Soviet authorities if captured. As a result, illegal border crossers had to arrive in a third country, for example Sweden, in order to defect to the West.

Both states verified the inviolability of borders and territorial integrity in the first Conference on Security and Co-operation in Europe in 1975.

== Infrastructure ==
The Finnish side has a border zone, where entry is legal only with a permit. It is 50 m at its narrowest and 3 km at its widest on land, varying in width according to terrain features. It is up to 4 km at sea. In Virmajärvi in Ilomantsi, it is delineated so that the easternmost point in Finnish territory is accessible without permit. The zone is marked in terrain with yellow signs, yellow straps or yellow painted rings around the trunk of a tree, and in waters, with buoys, signs and placards. The zone is not always uninhabited; inhabitants obtain permanent permits. Entering the border zone without permit is an offence punished with fines. In minor cases, foreigners are deported without punishment. Roads pass through the border zone to the border, and leaving the road is not permitted.

Although there are fences near major border crossings, the Finnish side is mostly not fenced. It is marked by a border vista and two or three boundary markers. The Finnish side has blue and white striped poles, tall enough to be visible in deep snow, displaying a Finnish coat of arms. Russians have a corresponding pole in red and green. A short white pole marks the actual border. In 2023, Finland began constructing a Finland–Russia border barrier at the southernmost part of the border.

Little reliable information is available on the status of the infrastructure on the Russian side after the Cold War. However, it is known that the border zone is much deeper on the Russian side, and that patrolling against genuinely unpermitted traffic is efficient.

== Traffic ==
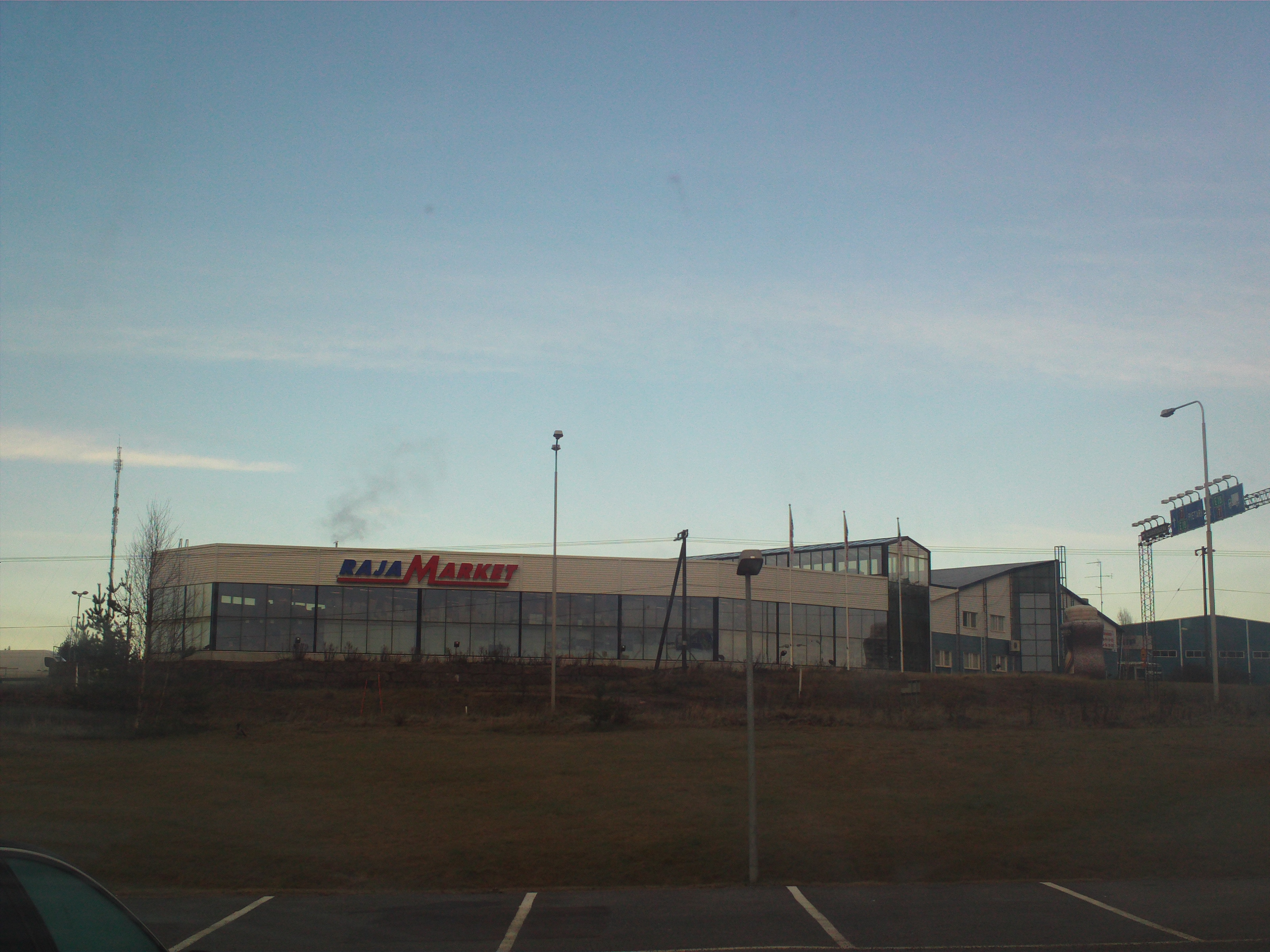
Rajamarket is a border shopping mall near the Russian border

In 2011, Finland issued the most Schengen visas to Russians out of all the countries in the Schengen area.

In 2015, 9.1 million individuals crossed the border, half of which went through Vaalimaa and Nuijamaa.

Traffic across the border was interrupted during the COVID-19 pandemic.

In 2023, Finland stopped issuing new tourist visas to Russians due to the Russo-Ukrainian War, and downgraded their travel advisory for Russia to "avoid all travel". New Finnish visas can only be issued for travelers in certain categories, such as people with family in Finland or people who currently reside or work in Finland. As a result, border traffic has not yet returned to pre-COVID-19 levels, though it still remains significant. By July 2023, there had been 973,337 border crossings, most of which occurred over land borders. Most people crossing the border had multiple-entry visas issued before 2019 or Schengen visas issued by other member states. Entering Finland via Norway still remains legal, as Norway does not restrict tourist visas.

On September 16, 2023, Finland banned vehicles with Russian license plates from entering their territory, in accordance with a decision by the European Union.

=== November 2023 border closures ===
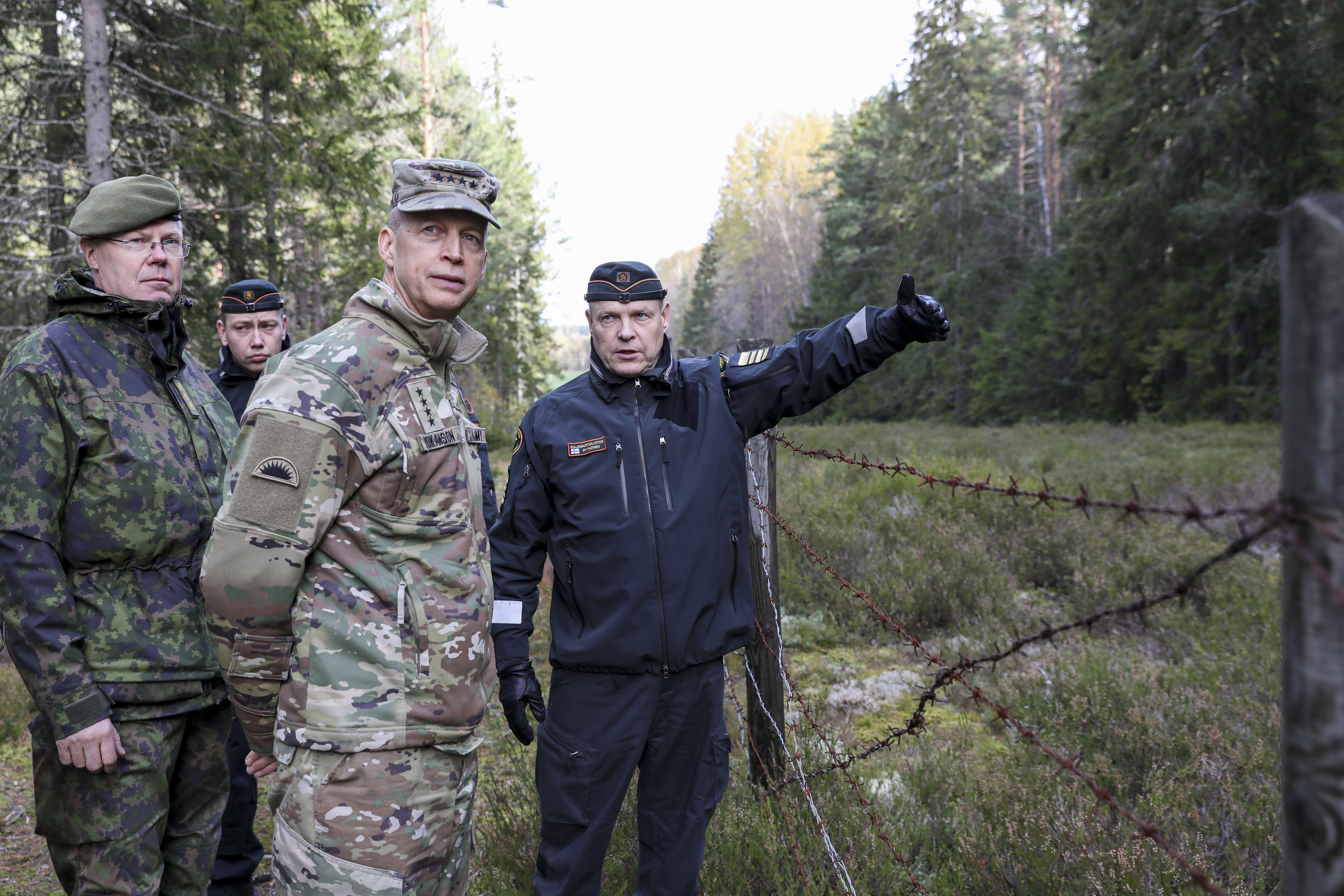
United States Army General Daniel R. Hokanson and chief of the National Guard Bureau visiting the Finland–Russia border in October 2023

Amid the worsening of relations between the two countries, on November 16, 2023, the Finnish Government announced the closure of four border crossings in the south-east (Vaalimaa, Nuijamaa, Imatra and Niirala), effective November 18, 2023. One week later, they announced the further closure of all other crossings (namely, Kuusamo, Salla and Vartius), effective November 24, 2023. The one exception was Raja‑Jooseppi, located in the Arctic Circle, through which asylum seekers could still cross. Additionally, on November 23, Frontex announced that the EU would help Finland secure its eastern border by deploying more personnel.

Only five days after the closure of Kuusamo, Salla and Vartius, the last remaining crossing, Raja-Jooseppi, was temporarily closed for a period of two weeks.

The closures, which applied to all traffic, including Finnish citizens, was to last until April 14, 2024. Initially, they were slated to reopen on February 11, 2024, but on February 8, the Finnish government announced an extension.

The Finnish government said the measures were taken to curb the influx of illegal entries into the country, which they claim is being "aided and encouraged" by Russia. The Finnish government has also accused Russia of deliberately using refugees as weapons as part of its hybrid warfare strategy.

== Incidents ==
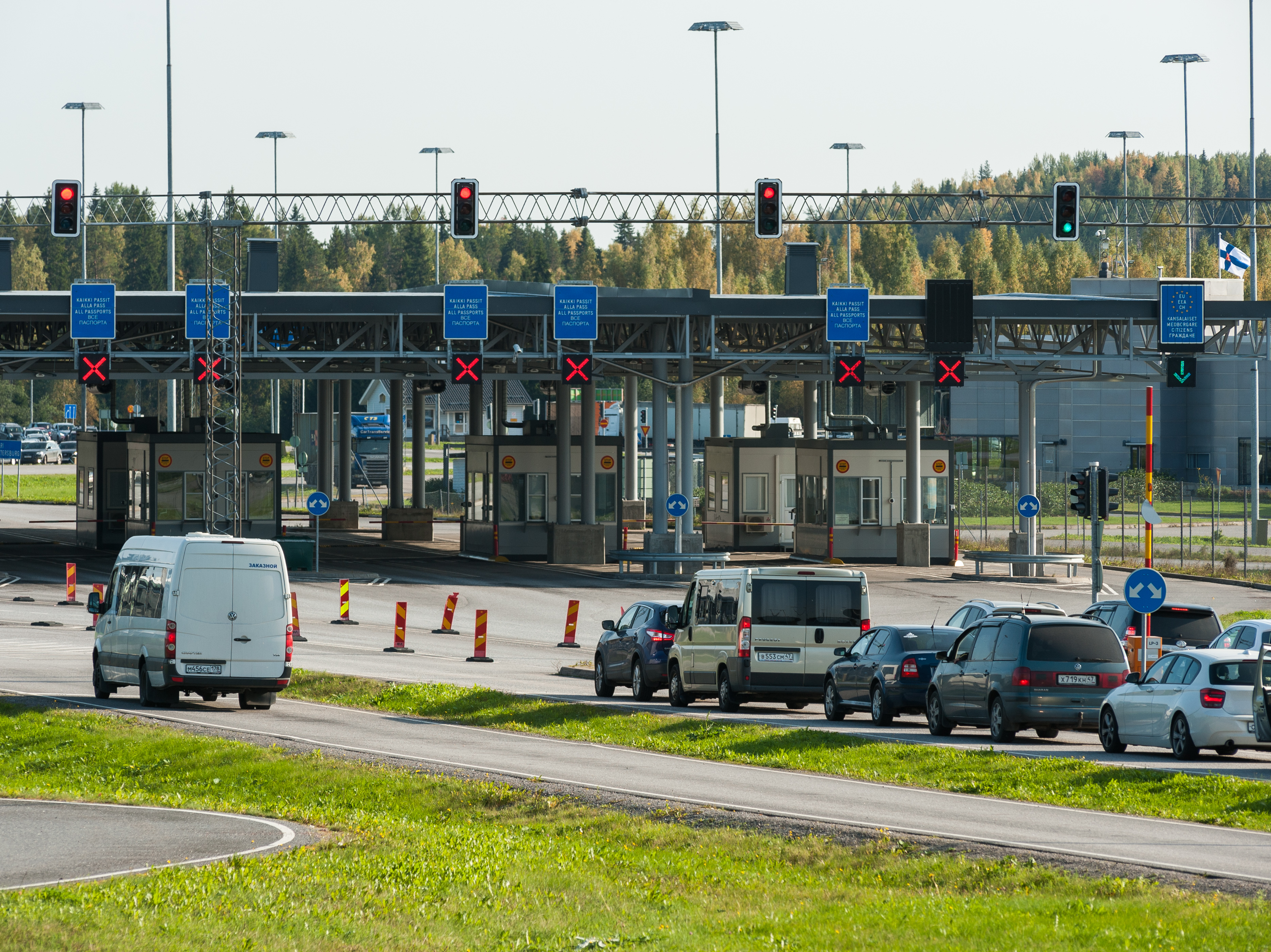
The car traffic on the Finnish side at the Nuijamaa Border Crossing Point in Nuijamaa, Lappeenranta, South Karelia, in September 2017

On 26 November 1939, the Soviet Union carried out a false flag attack on Finland, shelling the village of Mainila, located on the Soviet side of the Finland–Russia border, and then accusing Finland of being the aggressor. The Soviets used this as a pretext to instigate the Winter War, which began four days later on November 30.

On 27 December 2015, Finland blocked access to people crossing the border by bicycle at Raja-Jooseppi and Salla. According to the Finnish Border Guard, this measure was to limit illegal immigration and ensure safety on slippery roads. The Finnish Border Guard stated that organized traffickers were making their clients cross the border by bike in order to avoid being captured on the Finnish side and prosecuted for organizing illegal immigration, which is a felony in Finnish law. In response to the prohibition, asylum seekers started to cross the border by car, often using dilapidated cars purchased in Russia.

On 23 January 2016, Finnish Foreign Minister Timo Soini, member of the Finns Party, visited the Salla border crossing, where he talked about human smuggling across the border and claimed that there was "probably" an entity on the Russian side that was organizing the inflow of immigrants. Furthermore, a representative of the Finns Party noted that the influx of immigrants was causing disturbances for Finns driving to the Russian side to purchase petrol, as the border was being held up by lengthy immigration proceedings.

In March 2016, Finland and Russia temporarily closed the Raja-Jooseppi and Salla border crossings to third country nationals. Only Finnish, Russian and Belarusian citizens were allowed to use these crossings for a period of six months. The measure was later removed.

Finland began constructing a border barrier in 2023 due to the Russo-Ukrainian War.

Russia introduced a bill on 21 May 2024, aiming to redefine its maritime boundaries in the Baltic Sea. The proposed changes would expand its territorial waters by altering the maritime borders it shares with Finland and Lithuania, effective from January 2025. Initially published on the official website of the Registry of Laws, the text of the bill was later taken down.

== List of border checkpoints ==
A border crossing point. 1 Raja‑Jooseppi (closed), 2 Salla (closed), 3 Kuusamo (closed), 4 Vartius (closed), 5 Niirala (closed), 6 Parikkala (closed), 7 Imatra (closed), 8 Nuijamaa (closed), 9 Vainikkala (only railway use), 10 Vaalimaa (closed)

Regular border checkpoints, ordered from north to south, are as follows:

- Raja-Jooseppi / Lotta (road 91 / P11 / 47А-059)
- Salla (road 82)
- Kuusamo border station (road 866 / A136)
- Vartius (road 89)
- Vartius (Kontiomäki–Kostomuksha railway, freight only)
- Niirala (Tohmajärvi) / Vyartsilya (road 9 / A130)
- Imatra (road 62 / A124)
- Nuijamaa (road 13 / A127)
- Nuijamaa (Saimaa Canal)
- Vainikkala (Riihimäki – Saint Petersburg Railway, passenger and freight trains, the only rail crossing used in 2015)
- Vaalimaa/Torfyanovka (road E18 / 7 / M10)

In addition, there are provisional border crossing points:

- Haapovaara
- Inari
- Karttimo
- Kurvinen
- Leminaho
- Parikkala
- Ruhovaara
- Imatra railway crossing point (Imatra–Kamennogorsk railway, freight only)

== Passport stamps ==
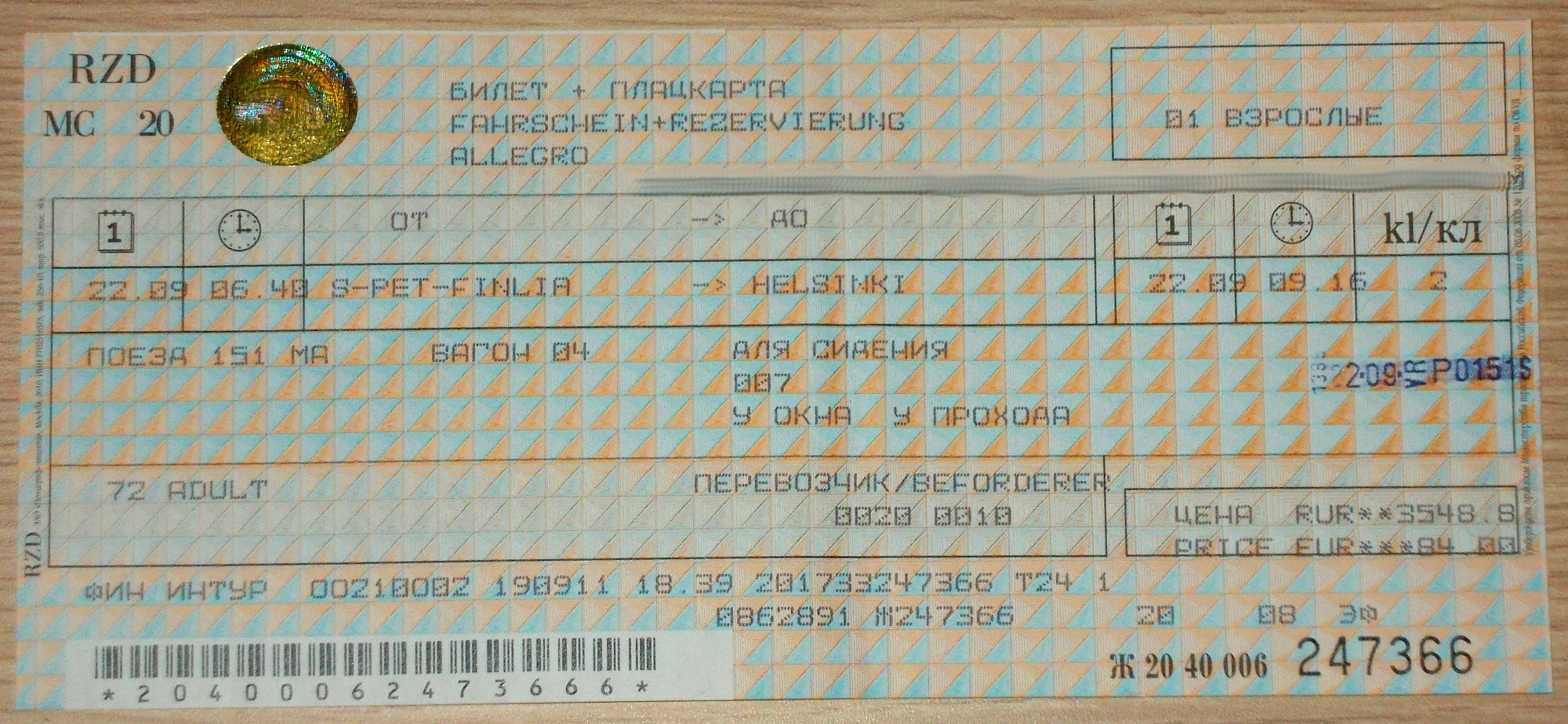
Allegro train ticket from St. Petersburg to Helsinki

The following are Finnish ink passport stamps issued at the Finnish–Russian border.

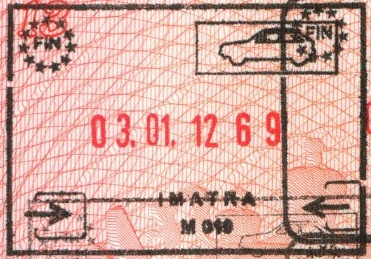
Passport entry stamp from the Finnish border checkpoint at Imatra

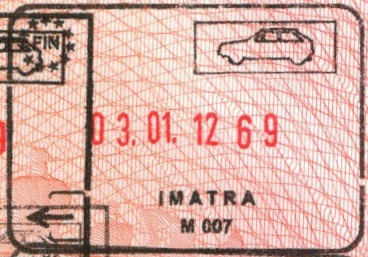
Passport exit stamp from the Finnish border checkpoint at Imatra

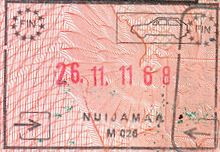
Passport entry stamp from the Finnish border checkpoint at Nuijamaa

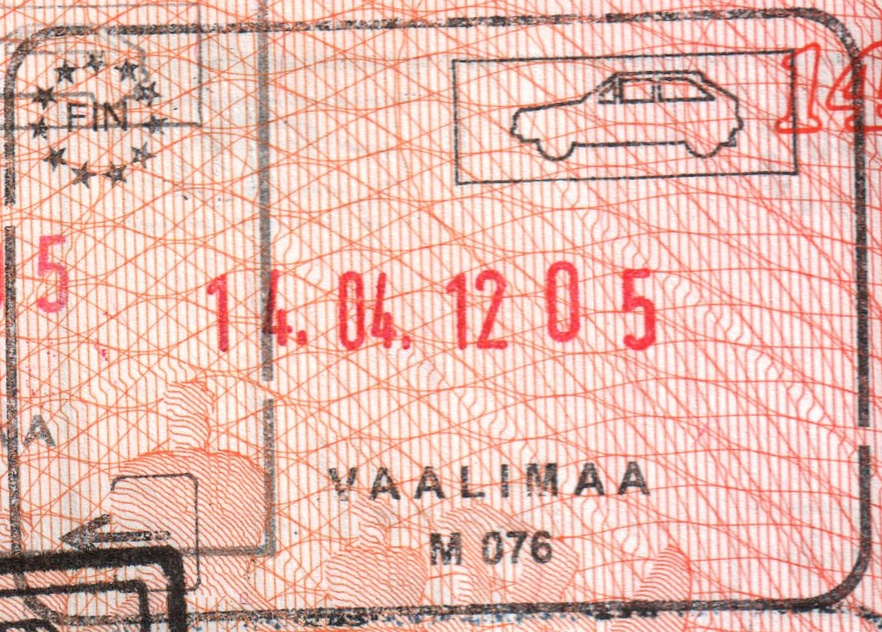
Passport exit stamp from the Finnish border checkpoint at Vaalimaa

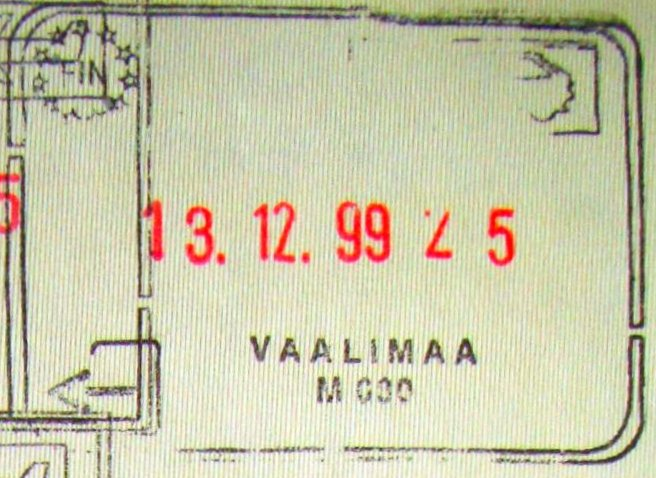
Passport exit stamp (old style) from the Finnish border checkpoint at Vaalimaa

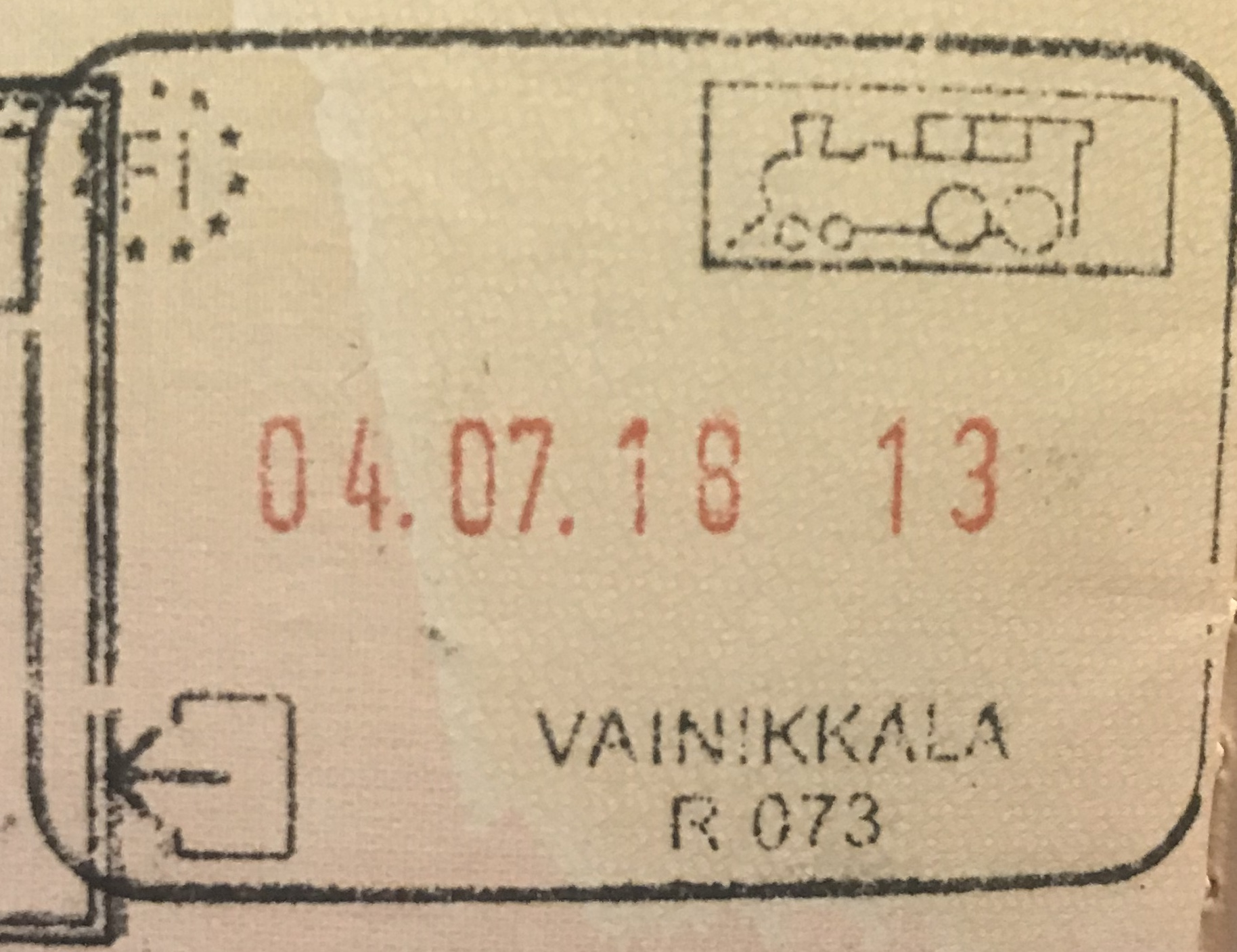
Passport exit stamp issued on the train in Vainikkala

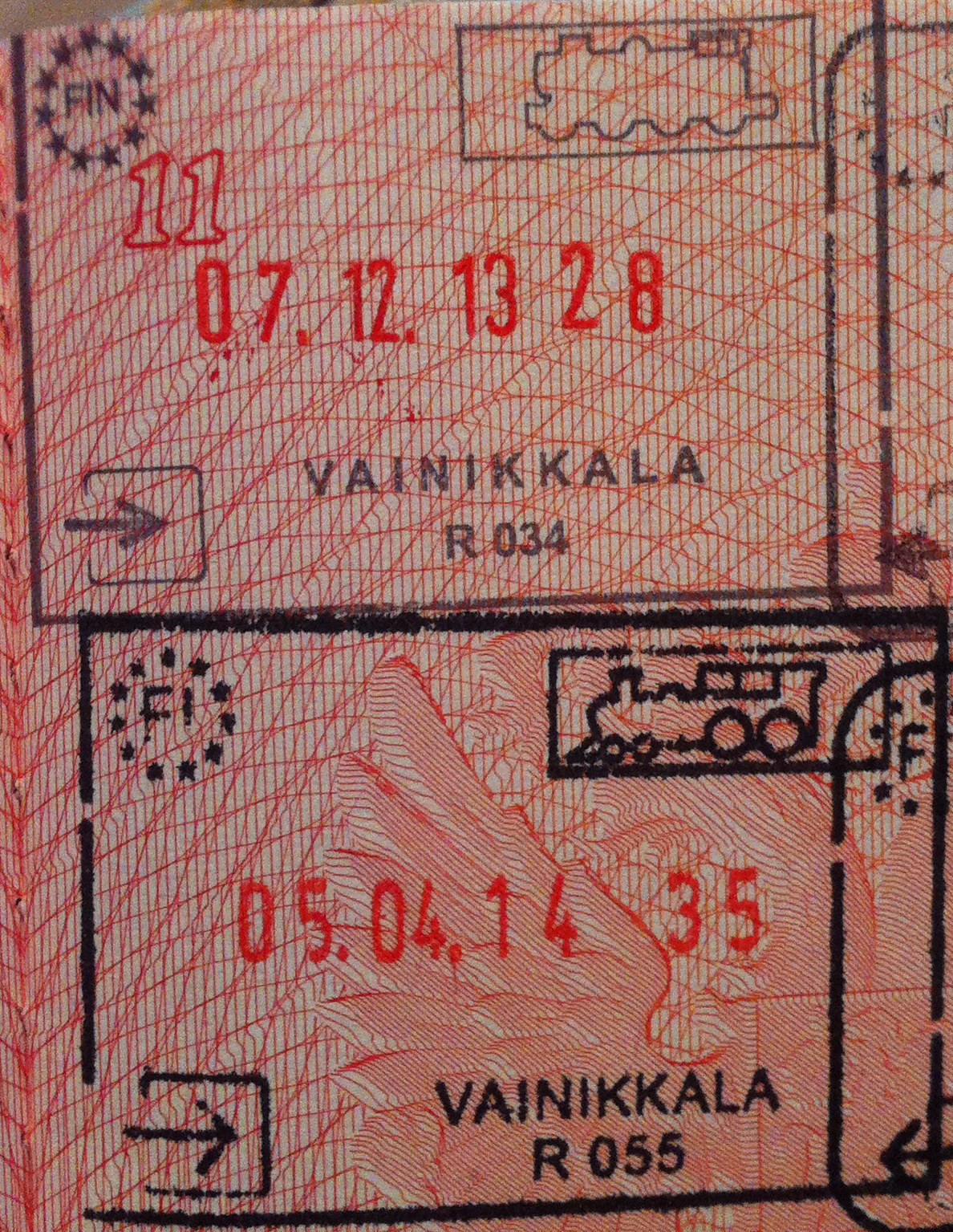
Passport entry stamp (new and old styles) issued on the train in Vainikkala

== See also ==
- Borders of Finland
- Borders of Russia
- Finland–Russia relations
- Finland–Russia border barrier
