= Vilovataya =

Vilovataya may refer to one of the following two rivers in Murmansk Oblast, Russia:

- Vilovataya (White Sea), a direct tributary of the White Sea
- Vilovataya (Vyala), a tributary of the Vyala
