= Lake Kanozero =

Lake in Murmansk, Russia

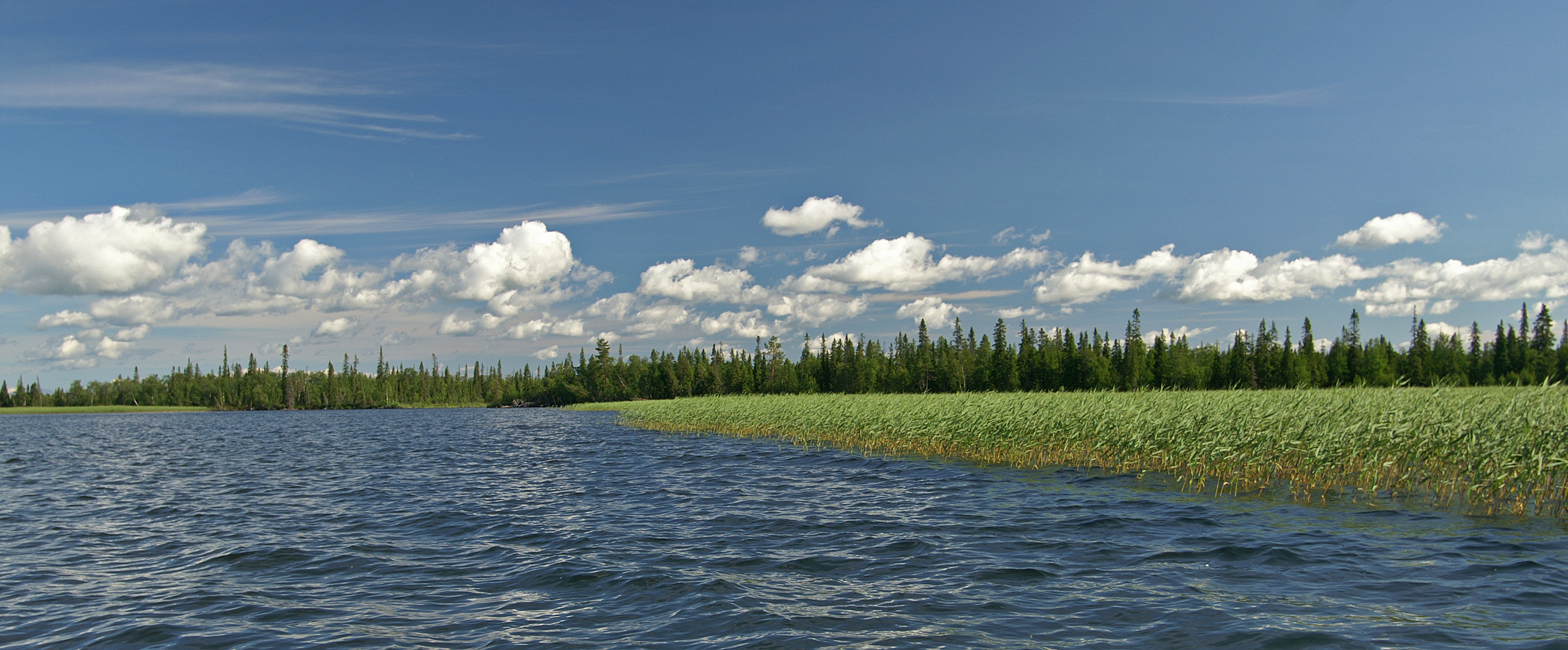

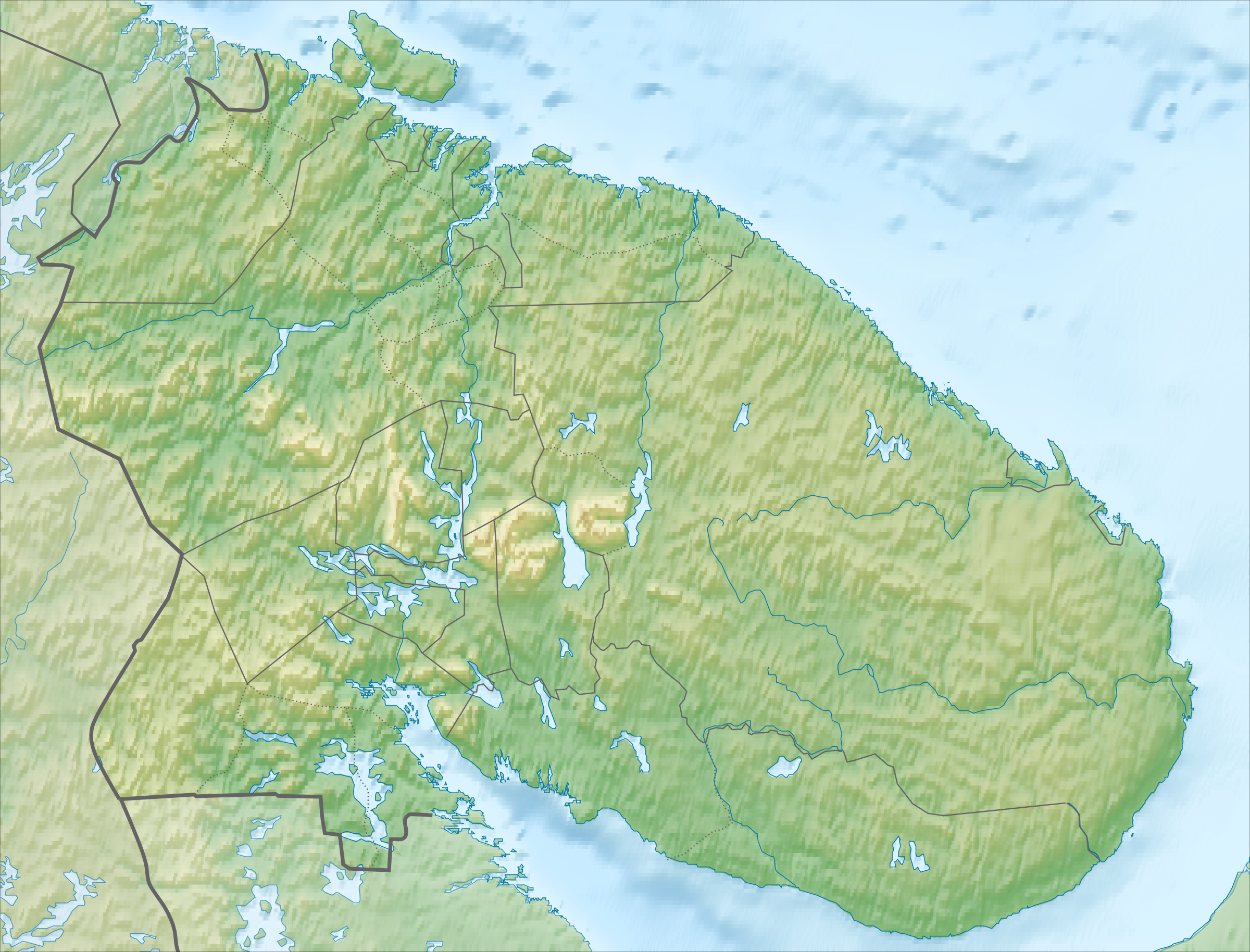
- Location within Murmansk Oblast Location within Russia
- Location: Murmansk Oblast
- Coordinates: 67°02′N 34°07′E
- Primary inflows: Umba, Muna, Kana
- Primary outflows: Umba
- Basin countries: Russia
- Max. length: 32 km (20 mi)
- Max. width: 6 km (3.7 mi)
- Surface elevation: 52 m (171 ft)

Kanozero (Russian: Канозеро) is a lake on the river Umba in Murmansk Oblast in Russia.

The lake is 32 km long and between three and six kilometers wide. Ita area is 84.3 square kilometres (32.5 sq mi). It is situated about halfway between Lake Umbozero and the White Sea. The Umba river enters the lake on the east side, about five kilometers from its northern end. Two of the Umba's main tributaries, the Kana and the Muna, flow into the Umba through Lake Kanozero.

The lake has two outflow channels: At Zasheyek-Kanozero at the very southern end of the lake the Rodvinga channel exits through the Kanoserskiy Falls, while five kilometers to the northeast the Kitsa channel leaves the lake over the Padun Falls. The channels rejoin in Lake Ponchozero about ten kilometers downriver.

Lake Kanozero is also known for the Kanozero Petroglyphs.
