= Umbozero (air base) =

- IATA: none; ICAO: none

Summary
- Airport type: Military
- Operator: Russian Air Force
- Location: Umbozero
- Elevation AMSL: 518 ft / 158 m
- Coordinates: 67°31′0″N 034°18′36″E
- Interactive map of Umbozero

Runways
Direction	Length		Surface
Direction	ft	m	Surface
	8,202	2,500	Concrete

For the lake, see Umbozero Lake

Umbozero (also Umba) was a Soviet Naval Aviation and Russian Navy reserve airfield in Murmansk Oblast, Russia located in the southwest Kola Peninsula 3 km north of Umbozero. It is now derelict with vegetation growing through the cracks between the concrete slabs and it is located 165 km southeast of Murmansk. This airfield provided 20 revetments for combat aircraft.

Umbozero was identified in the early 1960s by US reconnaissance aircraft, but only a few aircraft were observed at the airfield. In summer 1967 the runway was being paved. No regiment is believed to have been assigned permanently to the base, and as it contains almost no infrastructure it is thought to be a dispersal airfield for tactical aircraft.

== Umbozero South airfield ==
A nearby airfield with a 3000 m runway, also derelict, is listed on charts as "Umbozero South", exists 16 km south of Umbozero airfield. Like Umbozero, it is totally derelict and has almost no infrastructure. It is also categorized as a naval reserve airfield. It was one of nine Arctic staging bases for the Tupolev Tu-22M (Backfire).
