= Kana (river) =

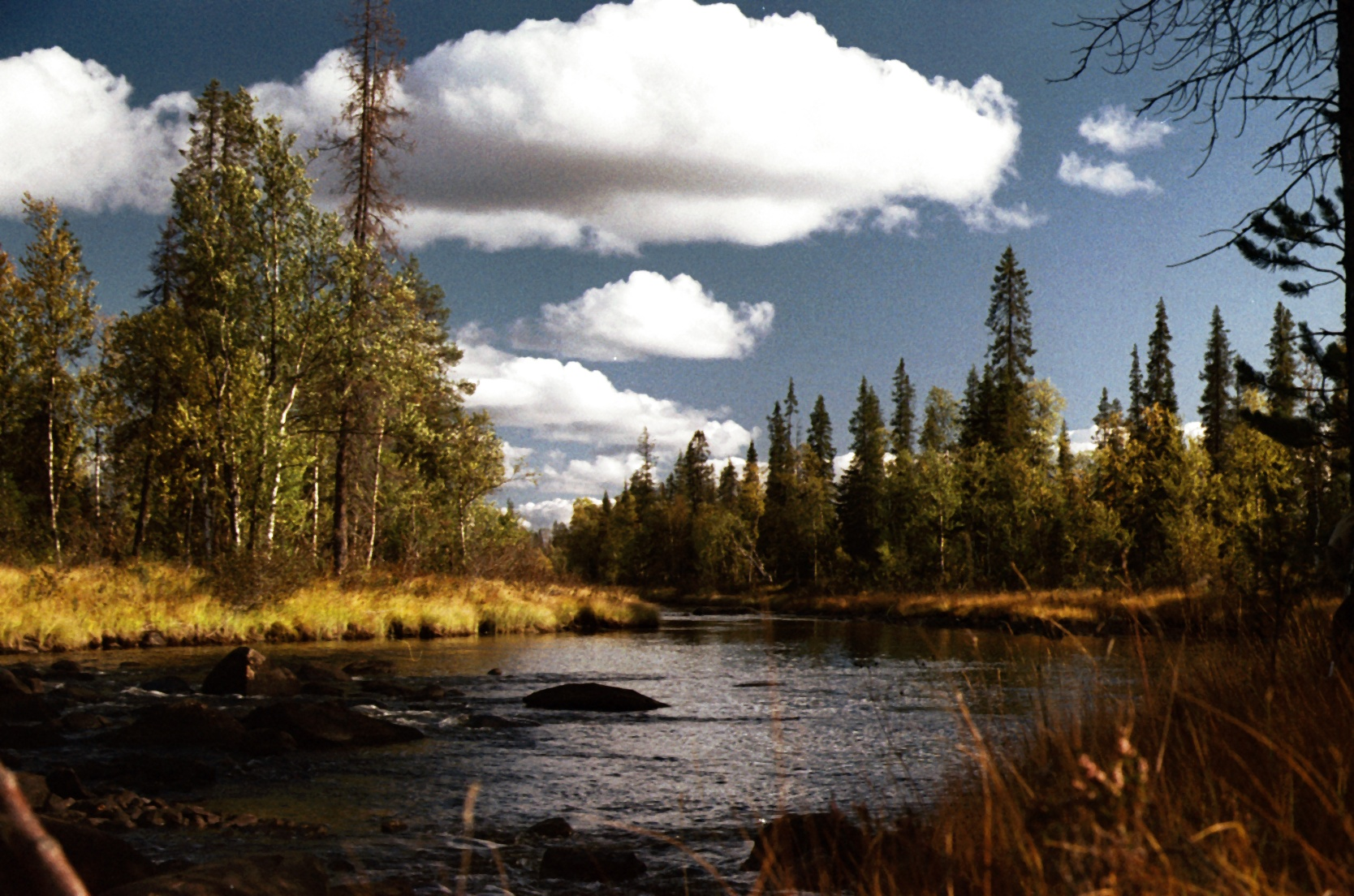

Location
- Country: Russia

Physical characteristics
- Mouth: Lake Kanozero
  - coordinates: 67.1314°N 33.9987°E
- Length: 48 km (30 mi)
- Basin size: 284 km^{2} (110 sq mi)

Basin features
- Progression: Lake Kanozero→ Umba→ White Sea

The Kana (Russian: Кана) is a river in the southwestern part on the Kola Peninsula, Murmansk Oblast, Russia. The Kana is a tributary to the Umba. It is 48 kilometres (30 mi) long, and has a drainage basin of 284 square kilometres (110 sq mi). It has its sources in the forests southeast of Lake Imandra, about 25 km south of the town of Apatity. From there it flows in a southeasterly direction, through a largely uninhabited landscape dominated by forests and bogs. Its outlet is at the northern end of Lake Kanozero on the Umba River.
