= Lake Vyalozero =

Lake in Murmansk Oblast, Russia

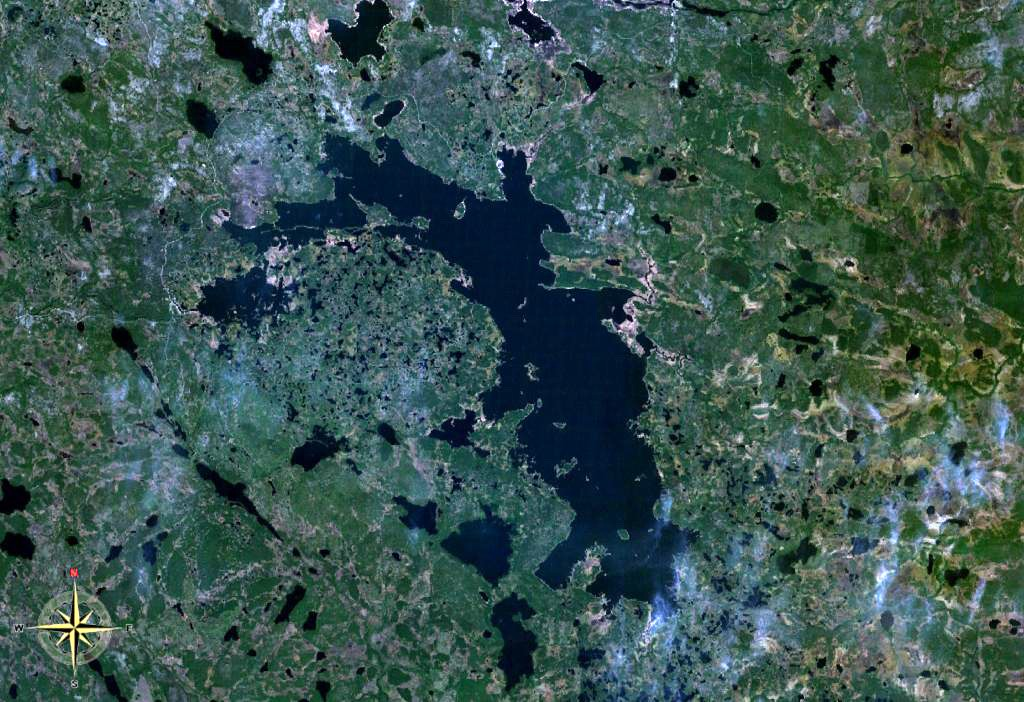
- from space

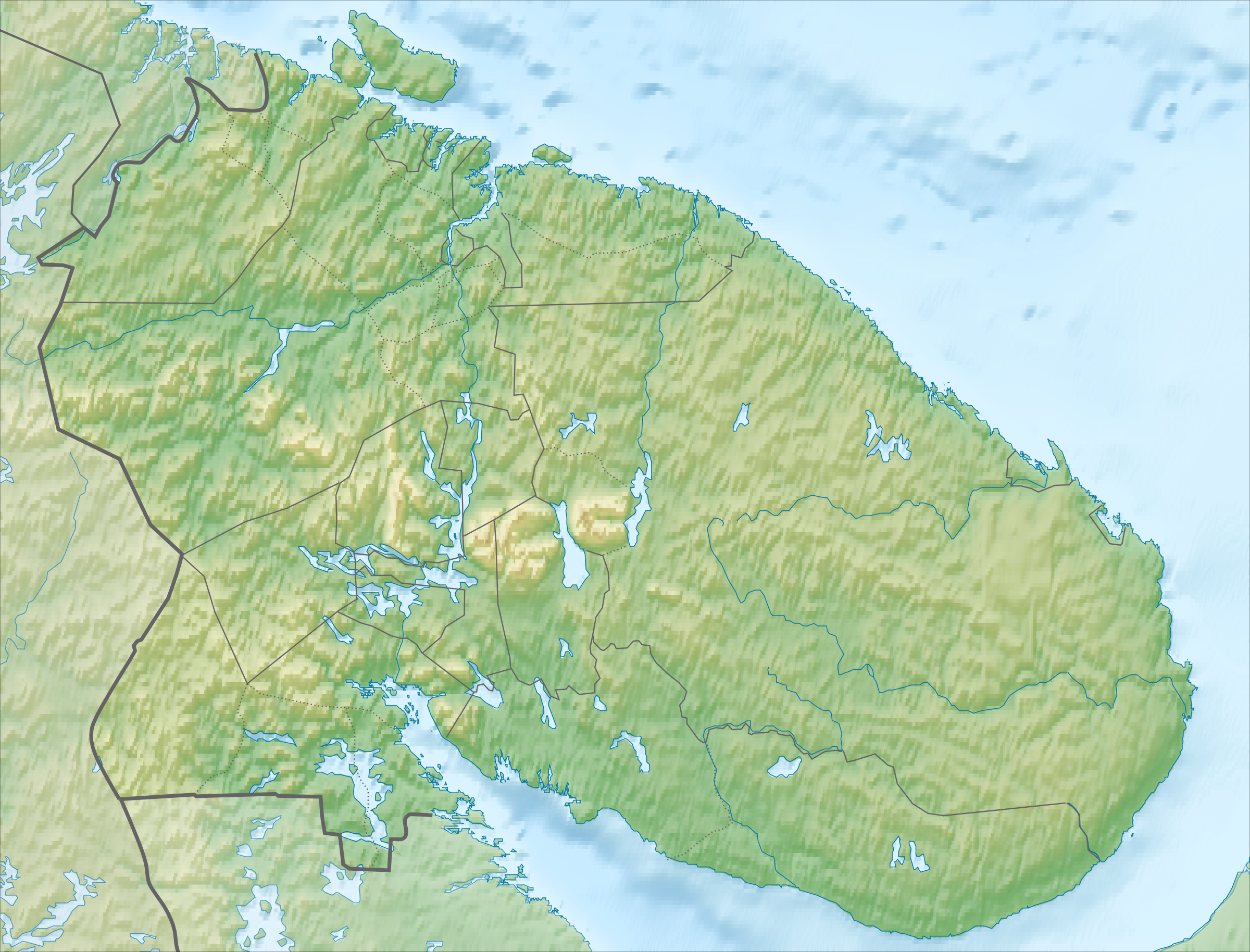
- Location within Murmansk Oblast Location within Russia
- Location: Kola Peninsula, Murmansk Oblast
- Coordinates: 66°50′23″N 35°10′22″E
- Primary outflows: Vyala River
- Basin countries: Russia
- Surface area: 98.6 km^{2} (38.1 sq mi)
- Water volume: 0.8 km^{3} (0.19 cu mi)
- Surface elevation: 116 m (381 ft)

Lake Vyalozero (Russian: Вялозеро) is a large freshwater lake on the Kola Peninsula, Murmansk Oblast, Russia. The lake is mesotropic, with a slower water exchange than the neighboring Lake Inari. It has an area of 98.6 km². Vyala River, a tributary of the Umba, flows from the lake.

== Ecology ==
Along with other lakes in northwestern Russia, Lake Vyalozero was in the path of airborne radiation following the Chernobyl disaster. In 1998, 12 years after the Chernobyl disaster, Lake Vyalozero contained 1.8 times the amount of Cesium-137 compared to Lake Inari.

Some paleoglaciologists have suggested that the Lake Vyalozero-Munozero was the western extent of the Fenno-Scandian ice sheet, though this has been disputed.
