= Kanozero Petroglyphs =

Set of rock drawings on an island in Lake Kanozero, Murmansk Oblast, Russia

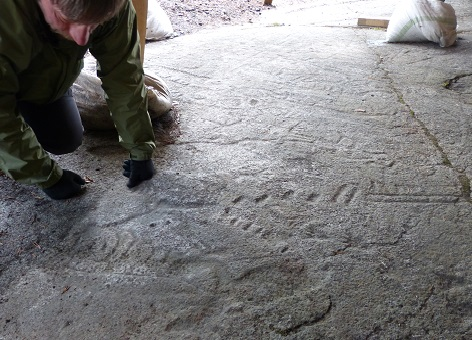
- Petroglyph specialist examining the Kanozero rock inscriptions
- Interactive map of Kanozero Petroglyphs
- Type: Rock art
- Location: Murmansk, Russia

History
- Built: c. 2000 BC

Site notes
- Discovered: 1997

The Kanozero Petroglyphs (Russian: Канозерские петроглифы, romanized: Kanozerskiye petroglify) are a set of rock drawings discovered in 1997 on an island in Lake Kanozero in the southwestern part of the Kola Peninsula in Murmansk Oblast, Russia. The petroglyphs have been dated from the 2nd and 3rd millennium BC. There are currently about 1,300 different images discovered in 18 groups at the site. Their meaning is not yet deciphered.

== See also ==
- Compartment No. 6, a film featuring a trip to and search for the petroglyphs.
