= Vilovataya (Vyala) =

River in Murmansk Oblast, Russia, tributary of Vyala

Location
- Country: Russia
- Region: Murmansk Oblast

Physical characteristics
- Source
  - location: Small Lambina lake
- Mouth: Vyala
  - coordinates: 66.8579°N 34.7379°E
- Length: 11 km (6.8 mi)
- Basin size: 48 km^{2} (19 sq mi)

Basin features
- Progression: Vyala→ Umba→ White Sea

The Vilovataya (Russian: Виловатая) is a river in the Murmansk region of Russia. It flows through Tersky District of Murmansk Oblast. It is a tributary of the Vyala. It is 11 kilometres (6.8 mi) long, and has a drainage basin of 48 square kilometres (19 sq mi).

Originating in Small Lambina lake, the river flows through the forest and marshland. It passes through the Upper and Lower Vilovatoe lakes, emptying into the right side of Vyala 31 km (19 mi) from its mouth at a height of 80.5 m (264 ft) above sea level. There are no settlements on the river.

According to the Russian state registry of water, it belongs to the "Barents and White Sea basin district".
