= Muna (Umba) =

River in Murmansk Oblast, Russia

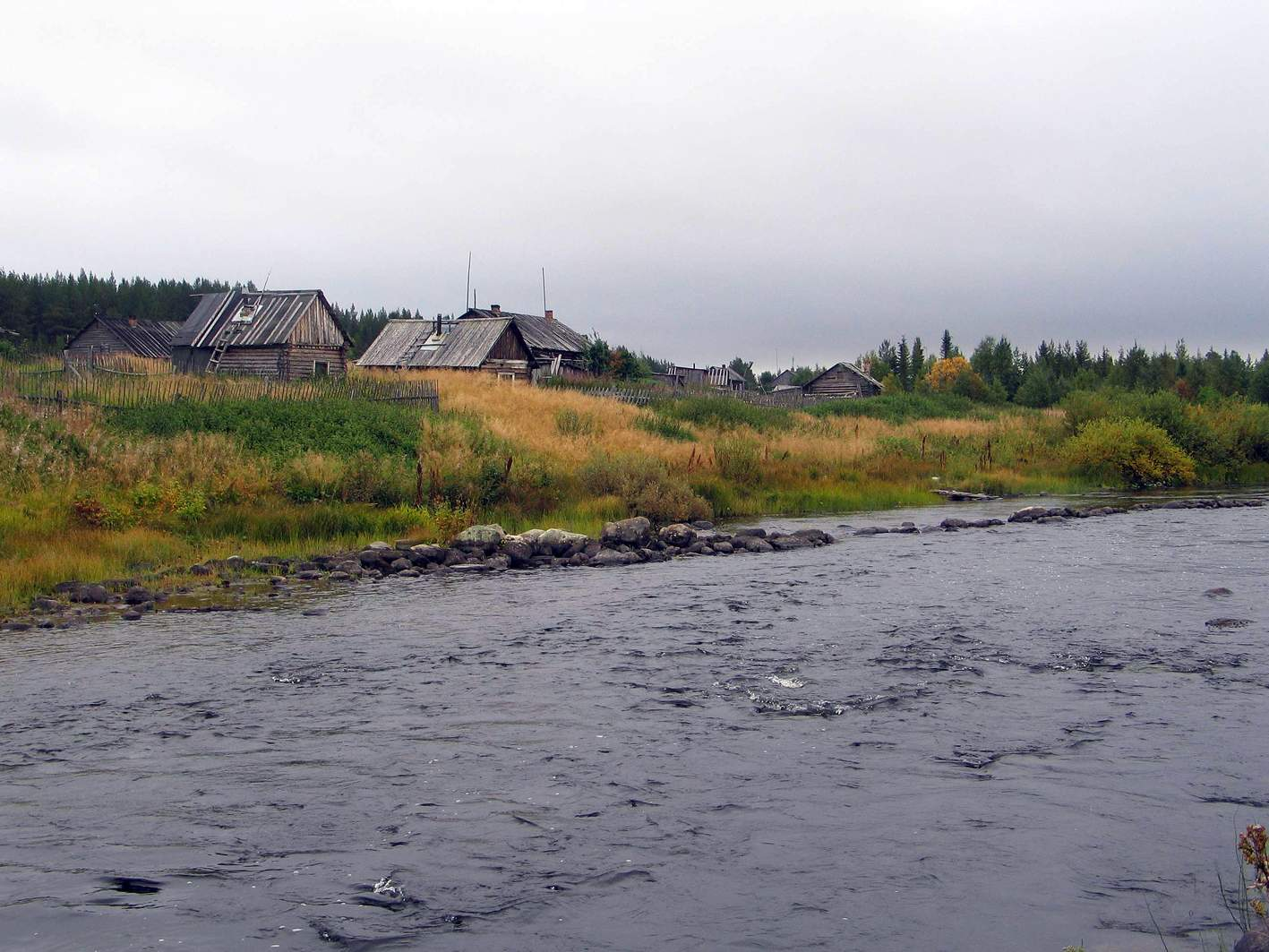

Location
- Country: Russia

Physical characteristics
- Source: Lake Munozero
  - coordinates: 67°04′29″N 34°40′36″E
- Mouth: Lake Kanozero
  - coordinates: 67.0647°N 34.1611°E
- Length: 40 km (25 mi)
- Basin size: 988 km^{2} (381 sq mi)

Basin features
- Progression: Lake Kanozero→ Umba→ White Sea

The Muna (Russian: Муна) is a river in the southwestern part on the Kola Peninsula, Murmansk Oblast, Russia. The Muna is a tributary to the river Umba. It is 40 kilometres (25 mi) long, and has a drainage basin of 988 square kilometres (381 sq mi). Its source is Lake Munozero, about 30 km east of Lake Kanozero. From there it flows towards the west, following a winding course through a sparsely populated, hilly landscape dominated by forests and bogs. A substantial tributary, the Inga, flows into the Muna from the north. The Muna's outlet is at the eastern bank of Lake Kanozero, about 8 km southeast of where the river Umba falls into the same lake.
