= Sarvanovsky Island =

Sarvanovsky Island Сарвановский
- Island
- Interactive map of Sarvanovsky Island
- Coordinates: 67°34′52″N 34°32′18″E
- Country: Russia
- Region: Murmansk Oblast

Area
  - Total: 2 km^{2} (0.77 sq mi)

Sarvanovsky (Russian: Сарвановский) is the largest island in Lake Umbozero. It is part of Kirovsk Urban Okrug, Murmansk Oblast, Russia.

The island has an area of 2 km^{2} (0.77 mi^{2}).
