= Vyala (river) =

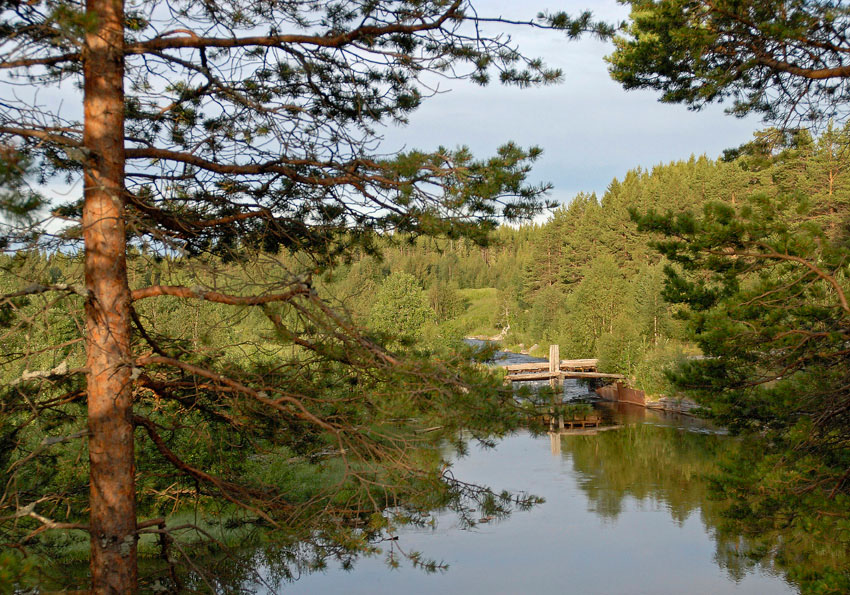

Location
- Country: Russia

Physical characteristics
- Mouth: Umba
  - coordinates: 66.7686°N 34.3572°E
- Length: 37 km (23 mi)
- Basin size: 852 km^{2} (329 sq mi)

Basin features
- Progression: Umba→ White Sea
- Tributaries
  - right: Vilovataya

The Vyala (Russian: Вяла) is a river in the southwestern part on the Kola Peninsula, Murmansk Oblast, Russia. The Vyala is a right tributary to the Umba. It is 37 kilometres (23 mi) long, and has a drainage basin of 852 square kilometres (329 sq mi). It flows westwards from Lake Vyalozero through a sparsely populated landscape of forests and bogs. It joins the Umba 16 km north of the Umba's outlet into the White Sea.
