= Umba (White Sea) =

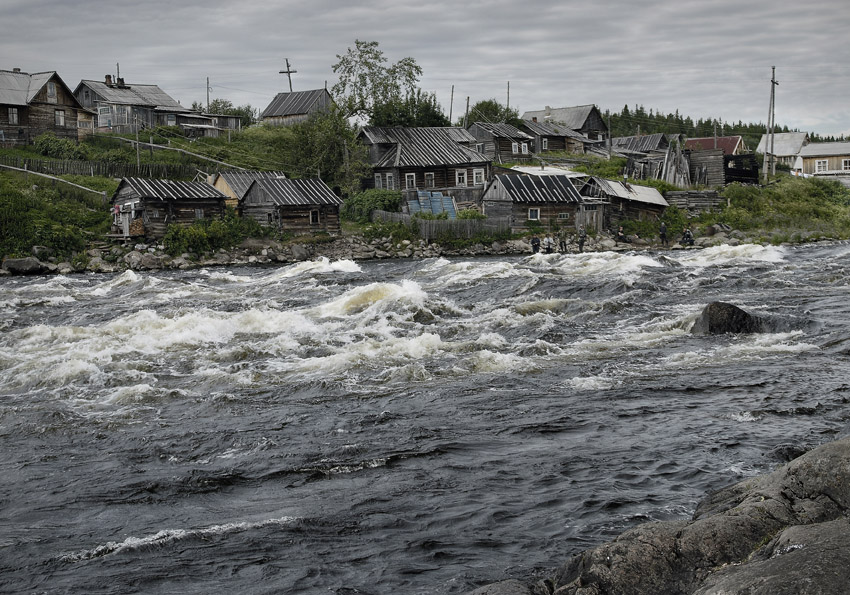
- Native name: Умба (Russian)

Location
- Country: Russia
- Region: Murmansk Oblast

Physical characteristics
- Source
  - location: Lake Umbozero
  - elevation: 149 m (489 ft)
- Mouth
  - location: Kandalaksha Gulf
  - coordinates: 66.8255°N 34.2781°E
  - elevation: 0 m (0 ft)
- Length: 123 km (76 mi)
- Basin size: 6,250 km^{2} (2,410 sq mi)
- Discharge
  - location: Payalka, 3.7 km from the mouth
  - average: 78.2 m^{3}/s (2,760 cu ft/s)

Basin features
- Tributaries
  - left: Vyala, Muna
  - right: Kana

The Umba (Russian: Умба) is a river on the Kola Peninsula, Murmansk Oblast, Russia. It discharges into the Kandalaksha Gulf of the White Sea. It is 123 kilometres (76 mi) long, and has a drainage basin of 6,250 square kilometres (2,410 sq mi).

== Geography ==
The river's source is Lake Umbozero, 100 km northeast of Kandalaksha, located between the mountains of the Khibiny Massif and the Lovozero Tundras on the Kola Peninsula. From there it flows south, through a landscape of forests and hills. The river alternates between rapids and more quiet sections, and it flows through several lakes, the largest of which is Lake Kanozero.

The river exits from Lake Kanozero through two separate outlet channels, about five kilometers apart. The outlets are called the Kitsa and the Rodvinga, and the latter again divides forming yet another channel called the Nizma. The Kitsa and Rodvinga rejoins in Lake Ponchozero, below which the river is again called the Umba, and it is rejoined by the Nizma a few kilometers further downstream.

The river empties into the Kandalaksha Gulf at the urban-type settlement of Umba.

Its biggest tributary is the Vyala, which comes from Lake Vyalozero and joins the Umba 15 km before the outlet to the sea.

== Fishing ==
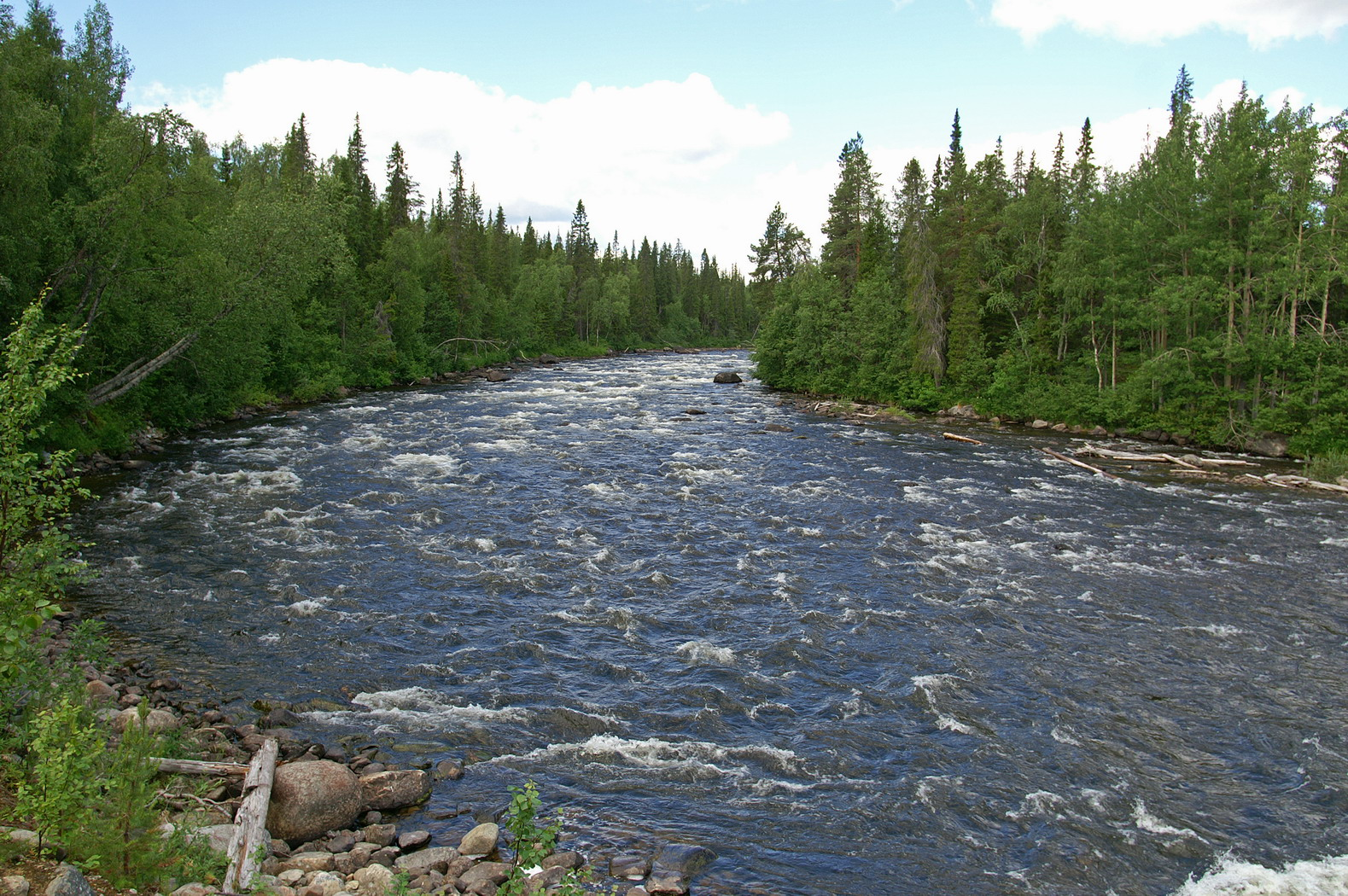

The Umba is known as a very good river for salmon fishing. Along with the Varzuga, it was the first river on the Kola Peninsula to be made available for fishing tourism for foreign customers in the early 1990s, and infrastructure such as fishing lodges has been built along the river to accommodate this.

However, in recent years the number of salmon has dropped, as a result of poaching by the local population, caused by an unemployment rate of a staggering 90% in the municipal centre of Umba, and made worse by the fact that drivable roads go along the banks of the entire length of the river, making it easily accessible.

== Other ==
The Umba is also used for timber floating.

Semi-precious stones found in the Umba river are used for high quality, very rare jewelry.
