= Vilovataya (White Sea) =

Location
- Country: Russia
- Region: Murmansk Oblast

Physical characteristics
- Mouth: White Sea
  - coordinates: 67°38′00″N 41°00′53″E
- Length: 19 km (12 mi)
- Basin size: 90.7 km^{2} (35.0 sq mi)

Vilovataya is a river in the Murmansk Oblast of Russia, which flows directly into the White Sea. According to the Russian state registry of water, it belongs to the "Barents and White Sea basin district". It is 19 kilometres (12 mi) long, and has a drainage basin of 91 square kilometres (35 sq mi).
