= Lake Umbozero =

Lake in Murmansk Oblast, Russia

Umbozero Lake
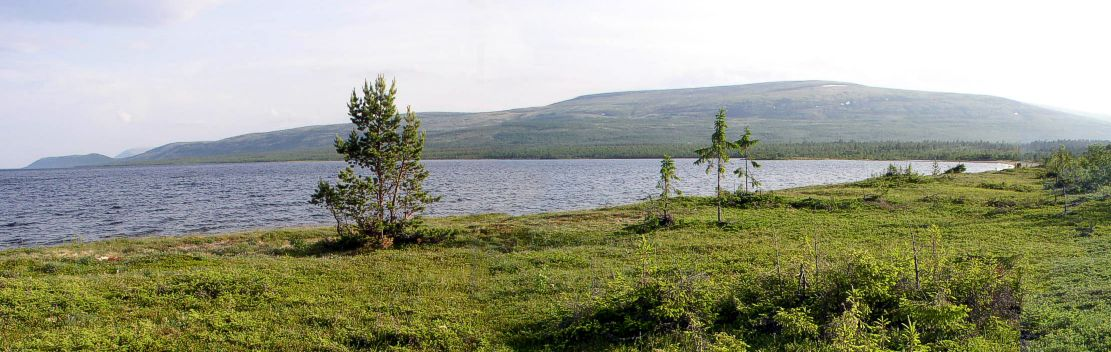

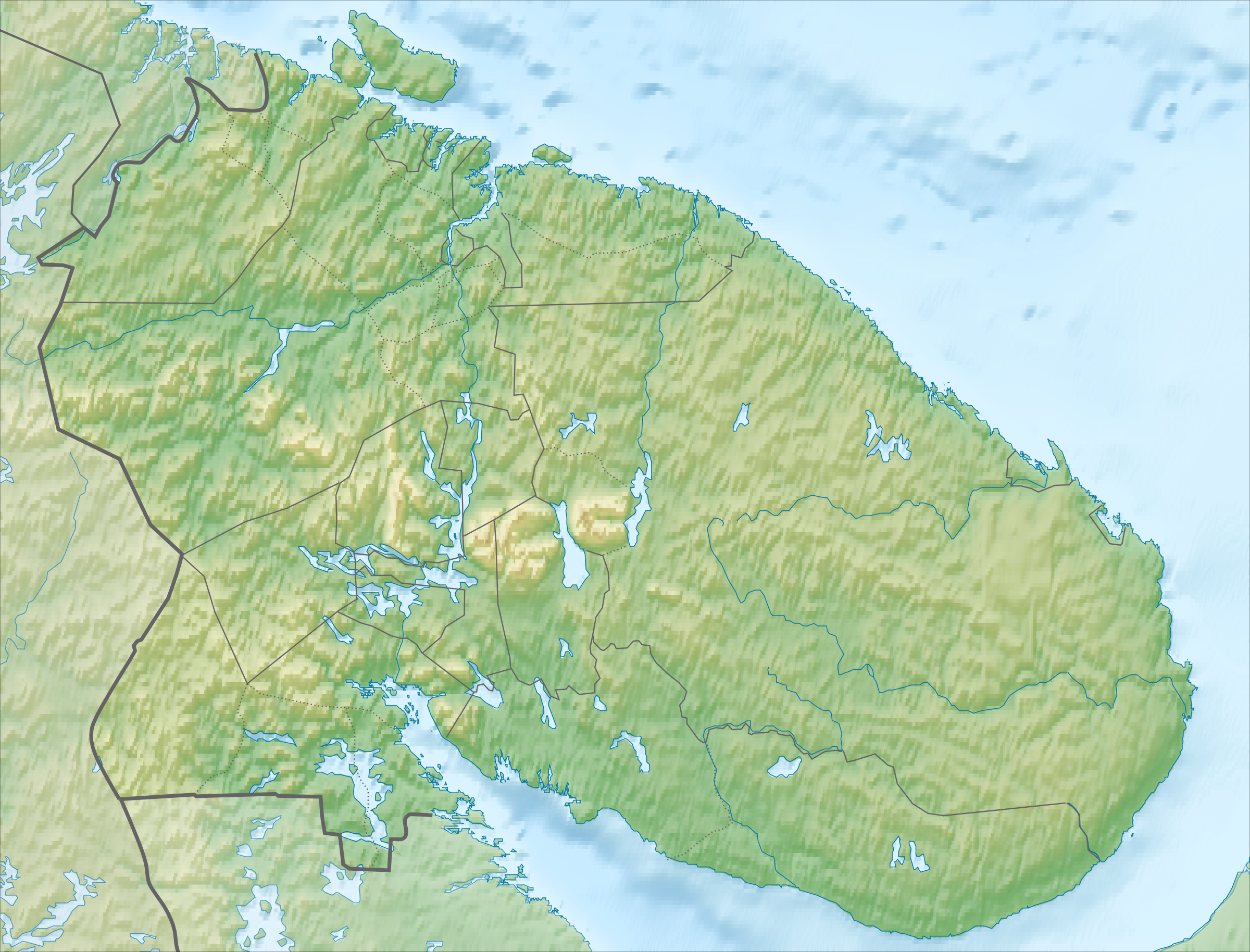
- Location within Murmansk Oblast Location within Russia
- Location: Murmansk Oblast
- Coordinates: 67°41′45″N 34°22′44″E
- Type: Natural lake
- Primary inflows: Sura River
- Primary outflows: Umba River
- Basin countries: Russia
- Max. length: 44 km (27 mi)
- Max. width: 10 km (6.2 mi)
- Surface area: 422 km^{2} (163 sq mi)
- Average depth: 15 m (49 ft)
- Max. depth: 115 m (377 ft)
- Surface elevation: 149 m (489 ft)

Umbozero Lake (Russian: Умбозеро, named after the adherent Umba River) is located in Murmansk Oblast of Russia, between the Khibiny on the west and Lovozero Tundras on the east. Area is 422 km^{2}, average depth is 15 m, maximum is 115. The lake freezes from the end of October. Its largest island is Sarvanovsky. Three kinds of fish are found in the lake.
