= Strelna (river) =

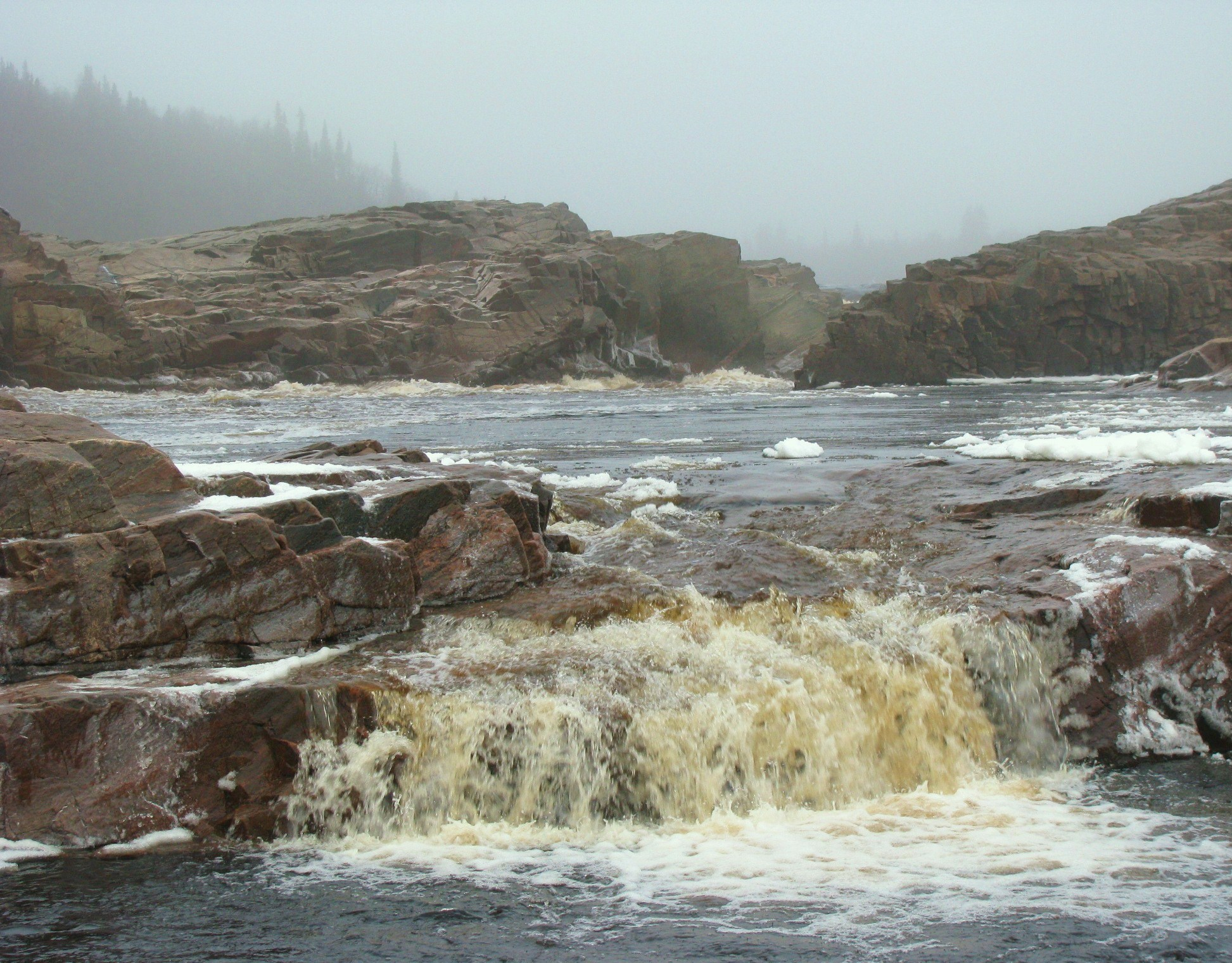

- Native name: Стрельна (Russian)

Location
- Country: Russia
- Region: Murmansk Oblast

Physical characteristics
- Mouth
  - location: White Sea
  - coordinates: 66°04′08″N 38°38′43″E
  - elevation: 0 m (0 ft)
- Length: 213 km (132 mi)
- Basin size: 2,770 km^{2} (1,070 sq mi)

The Strelna (Russian: Стрельна) is a river in the south of the Kola Peninsula in Murmansk Oblast, Russia. It is 213 kilometres (132 mi) long, and has a drainage basin of 2,770 square kilometres (1,070 sq mi). The Strelna originates on the Keivy and flows into the White Sea. Its biggest tributary is the Beryozovaya.
