= Sápmi =

Sámi cultural region of Fennoscandia

Coordinates: 68°N 20°E

- Flag
- Anthem: Sámi soga lávlla
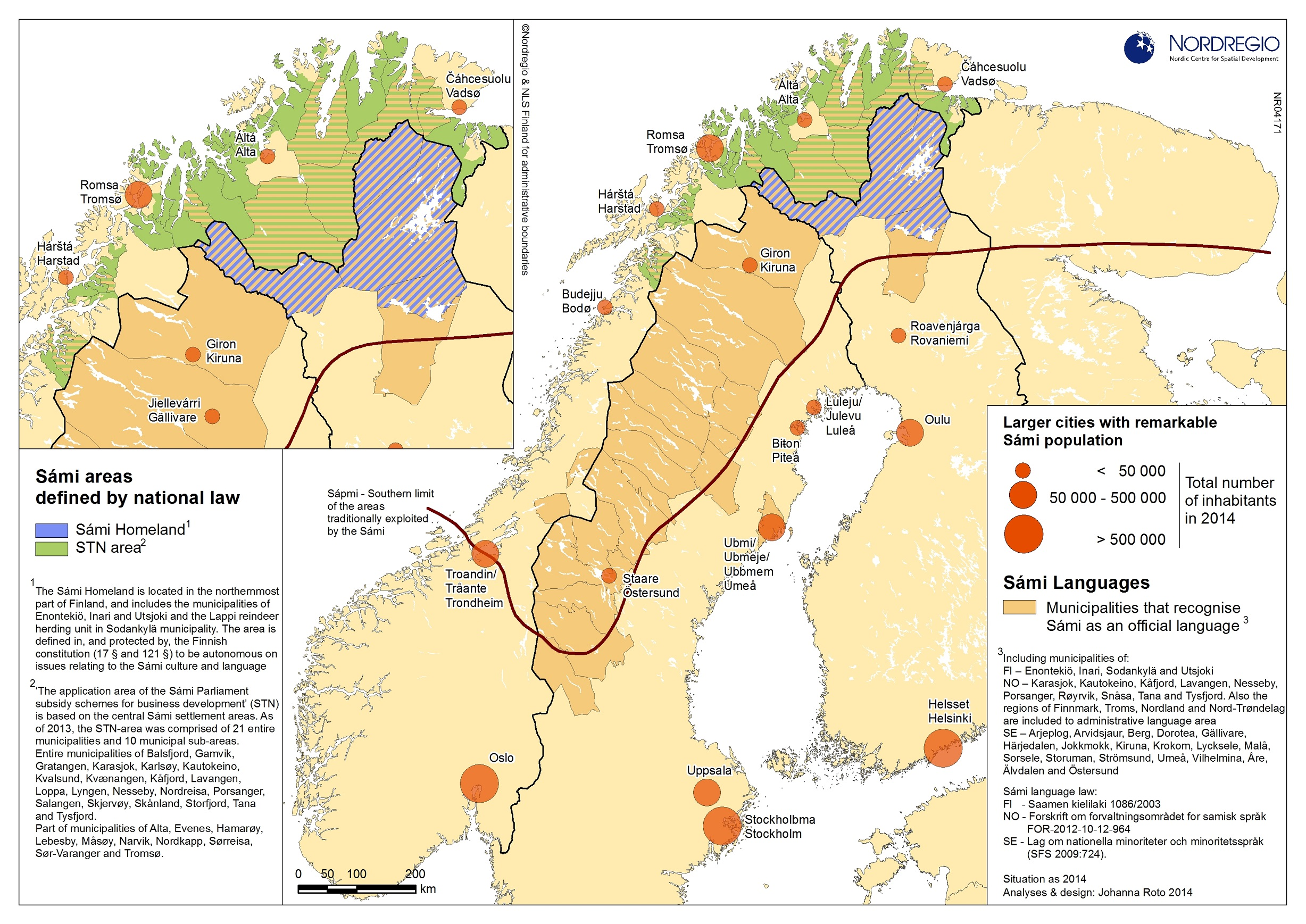
- Location of Sápmi: dark red line showing the Southern limit of the areas traditionally inhabited by the Sámi
- Regional: Sámi languages, Norwegian, Swedish, Finnish, Meänkieli, Kven and Russian
- Demonym: Sámi

Integrated parts of Norway, Sweden, Finland and Russia respectively, but with varying degrees of autonomy for the Sami
- Time zone: UTC+1 to +3 (CET, EET, FET)

- People: Sámi
- Language: Sámi
- Country: Sápmi

Sápmi is the cultural region traditionally inhabited by the Sámi people. Sápmi includes the northern parts of Fennoscandia, stretching over four countries: Norway, Sweden, Finland, and Russia. Most of Sápmi lies north of the Arctic Circle, bounded by the Barents Sea, Norwegian Sea, and White Sea. In the south, Sápmi extends to the counties of Trøndelag in Norway and Jämtland in Sweden.

Most of the Sámi population is concentrated in a few traditional areas in the northernmost part of Sápmi, such as Kautokeino and Karasjok. Inari is considered one of the centres of Sámi culture. In the past, the Sámi settlement reached much farther south, possibly to present-day Oslo in the west and the lakes Ladoga and Onega in the east.

Sápmi has never been a sovereign political entity. Since the 1970s–1990s, the Sámi have had a limited self-governance in the Nordic states, represented by the Sámi Parliaments. The interstate cooperation is organized by the umbrella organization Sámi Council.

Historically, the Scandinavian peoples referred to the Sámi using the exonyms Finns and Lapps, terms now considered outdated or pejorative. In Scandinavian languages, historical names for the region include Finnmǫrk, Lappmarken, and Lappland, and in English, Sápmi has traditionally been called Lapland (/ˈlæp.lænd/). Today, variations of these names persist in smaller cultural, geographic and administrative designations within each country, such as Finnmark County in Norway, Lapland Province in Sweden and Lapland Region in Finland, all of which overlap with Sápmi. The Russian part of the Sápmi is covered by Murmansk Oblast.

== Etymology ==
Sápmi (and corresponding terms in other Sámi languages) refers to both the Sámi land and the Sámi people. The word Sámi is the accusative-genitive form of the noun Sápmi—making the name's (Sámi olbmot) meaning "people of Sápmi". The origin of the word has been argued to be related to the Baltic word *žēmē, meaning "land". Also Häme, the Finnish name for Tavastia, a historical province of Finland, is thought to have the same origin, and the same word has been argued to be the origin of Suomi, the Finnish name for Finland, although the issue is debated.

Sápmi is the name in Northern Sámi, the most widely spoken of the Sámi languages. In other languages, the following terms are used:

- Northern Sami: Sápmi / Sámieanan
- Lule Sami: Sábme / Sámeednam
- Southern Sami: Saepmie
- Pite Sami: Sämijednam
- Ume Sami: Sábmie
- Inari Sami: Säämi
- Skolt Sami: Sääʹmjânnam
- Kildin Sami: Са̄мь е̄ммьне, romanized: Saam' jiemm'n'e

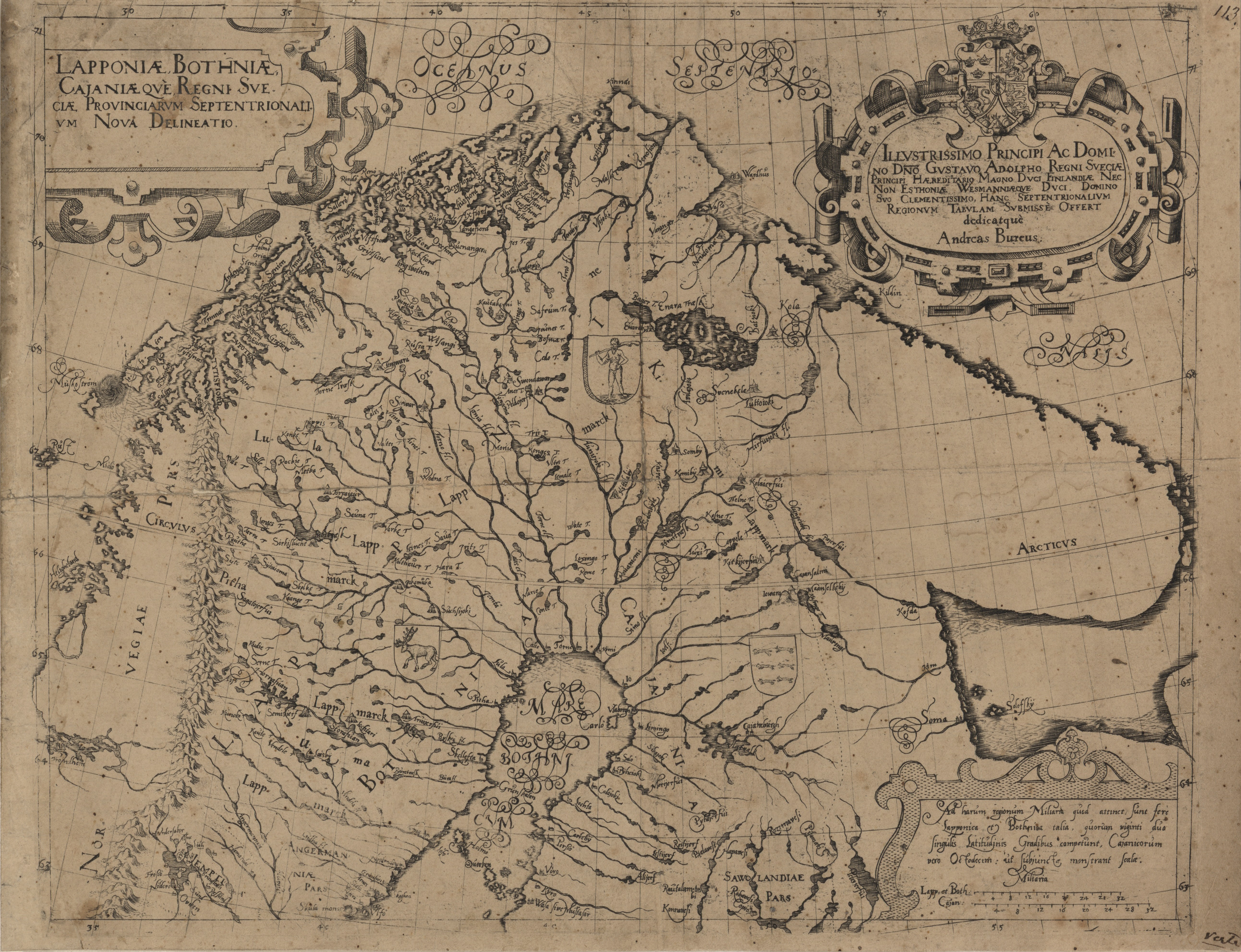
Lapponia, the first reliable map of the northern regions of both Sweden and Finland (1611), is also an important source for discussions about the early modern history of Sámi peoples.

In modern Swedish and Norwegian, Sápmi is known as either Sapmi or Sameland. In Finnish it is known as Saamenmaa or saamelaisalue. In Old Norse, it was historically called Finnmǫrk, a name that later evolved into Finnmark, the name of Norway's northernmost county. In older Swedish, Sápmi was known as Lappmarken or Lappland. Some English language sources refer to Northern Norway and Murmansk Oblast as Norwegian Lapland and Russian Lapland, respectively, especially in the context of tourism marketing.

Lappland became the name of Sweden's northernmost province (landskap) which was divided in 1809, leaving one part in Sweden and other under Finland, which became part of the Russian Empire. The name Lappland remains in use for both the Swedish province of Lapland and the Finnish region of Lapland. Finnish Lapland includes Peräpohjola, a region traditionally considered part of Ostrobothnia. Consequently. Lapland and Sápmi are not interchangeable in the Finnish context. While Rovaniemi is located in Lapland, it is not part of Sápmi.

In the 17th century, Johannes Schefferus assumed the etymology of the term Lapland to be related to the Swedish word for "running", löpa (cognate with English, to leap). The terms Lapp and Lappland are now regarded as outdated or offensive by many Sámi people, who prefer the area's name in their language Sápmi, because over time the term Lapp has acquired the pejorative connotation of "silly", "uneducated", "backwards", etc. in the major languages of the Scandinavian countries that include Sápmi.

== Geography ==
=== Landscape ===
The largest part of Sápmi lies north of the Arctic Circle. The western portion is an area of fjords, deep valleys, glaciers and mountains, the highest point being Mount Kebnekaise (2,096.8 m [6,879 ft]). The Swedish part of Sápmi is characterized by great rivers running from the northwest to the southeast. From the former Norwegian county of Troms and Finnmark and eastward, the terrain is that of a low plateau with many marshes and lakes, the largest of which is Lake Inari in Finnish Lapland. The extreme northeastern section lies within the tundra region, but it does not have permafrost. In the 19th century, scientific expeditions to Sápmi were undertaken, for instance by Jöns Svanberg.

=== Climate ===
The climate is subarctic/tundra and vegetation is sparse, except in the densely forested southern portion. The mountainous west coast has significantly milder winters and more precipitation than the large areas east of the mountain chain. North of the Arctic Circle polar nights characterize the winter season and the midnight sun the summer season—both phenomena are longer the further north you go. Traditionally, the Sami divide the year into eight seasons instead of four.

In Inari, the climate is warm-end subarctic, with summer highs of 18 °C (64 °F), and winter lows of −15 °C (5 °F). The average winter sees 131 days of snowfall, with the first flakes falling to the ground in September. Snow cover lasts about two-thirds of the year and may persist past the last flake and even the last frost.

Even without permafrost or a true tundra climate, much of Sápmi is arctic moorland with stunted, scattered trees.

=== Natural resources ===
Mountain reindeers, Eurasian wolves, Eurasian brown bears, and birds are the main forms of animal life, in addition to a myriad of insects in the short summer. Sea and river fisheries abound in the region. Steamers are operated on some of the lakes, and many ports are ice-free throughout the year. All ports along the Norwegian Sea in the west and the Barents Sea in the northeast to Murmansk are ice-free all year. The northern part of the Gulf of Bothnia usually freezes over in winter. The ocean floor to the north and west of Sápmi has deposits of petroleum and natural gas. Sápmi contains valuable mineral deposits, particularly iron ore in Sweden, copper in Norway, and nickel and apatite in Russia.

=== Cultural subdivisions ===
==== East Sápmi ====
East Sápmi consists of the Kola Peninsula and the Lake Inari region and is home to the eastern Sami languages. While being the most heavily populated part of Sápmi, this is also the region where the Indigenous population and their culture are weakest. Corresponds to the regions marked 6 through 9 on the map below.

==== Central Sápmi ====
Central Sápmi consists of the western part of Finland's Sami Domicile Area, the parts of Norway north of the Saltfjellet mountains and areas on the Swedish side corresponding to this. Central Sápmi is the region where Sami culture is strongest and home to North Sami—the most widely used Sami language, with around 20,000 speakers as of 2024. In the southernmost part of this subregion, however, Sami culture is rather weak—this is where the moribund Bithun Sami language is used. The areas around the Tysfjorden fjord in Norway and the river Lule in Sweden are home to the Julev Sami language, one of the more widely used Sami languages. These correspond to the regions marked 3 through 5 on the map below.

==== South Sápmi ====
South Sápmi consists of the areas south of Saltfjellet and corresponding areas in Sweden and is home to the southern languages. In this area, Sami culture is mostly visible inland and on the coast of the Baltic Sea, and the languages are spoken by few. Corresponds to the regions marked 1 and 2 on the map below to the southeast of region 1 in Sweden.

== Sámi languages ==
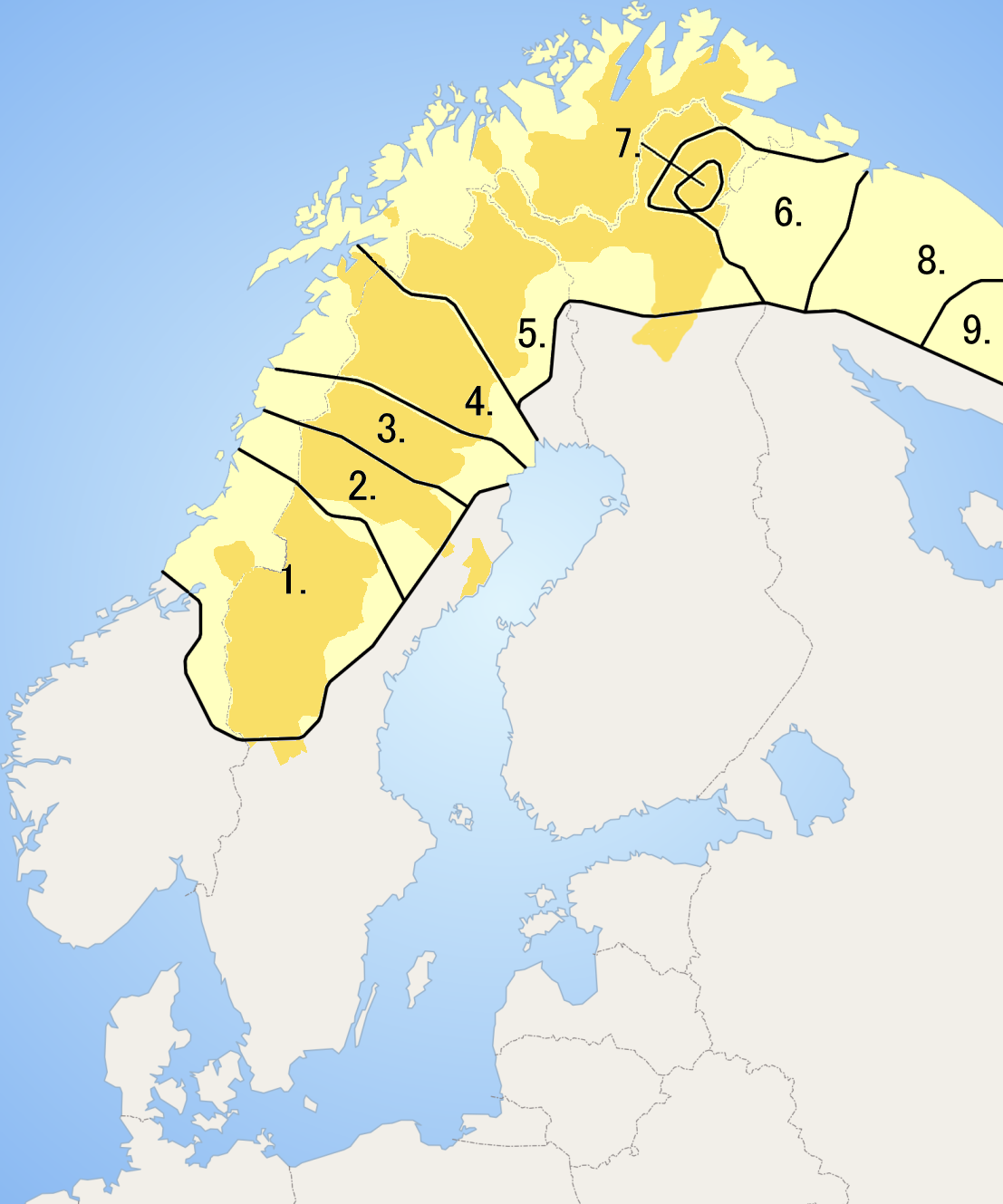
Map of Sámi language areas: 1. Southern (Åarjel) Sámi; 2. Ume (Ubme) Sámi; 3. Pite (Bidum) Sámi; 4. Lule (Julev) Sámi; 5. Northern (Davvi) Sámi; 6. Eastern (Skolt) Sámi; 7. Inari (Ánár) Sámi; 8. Kildin (Kīllt) Sámi; 9. Ter (Tar'je) Sámi; Darkened areas represent municipalities that recognize Sami as an official language.

The Saamic languages are the region's main minority languages and its oldest attested languages. They belong to the Uralic language family and are most closely related to the Finnic languages. Many Sami languages are mutually unintelligible, but the languages originally formed a dialect continuum stretching southwest and northeast, so that a message could hypothetically be passed between Sami speakers from one end to the other and be understood by all. Today, however, many of the languages are moribund and thus there are "gaps" in the original continuum.

On the map to the right numbers indicate Sámi languages. Of these languages, Northern Sámi is by far the most vital; whereas Ume Sámi and Pite Sámi are critically endangered. Kemi Sámi has been extinct for over a century.

North Sami is subdivided into three main dialects: West, East, and Coast. The written standard is based on the Western dialect.

== Demography ==
It is difficult to give estimates of inhabitants since Sápmi is not precisely defined. It is also difficult to account for the distribution of ethnic groups as many people have double or multiple ethnic identities—both seeing themselves as members of the majority population and being part of one or more minority groups.

The number of Sámi is generally estimated to be between 80,000 and 100,000. Many live in areas outside Sápmi such as Oulu, Oslo, Stockholm and Helsinki. Some Sámi people have migrated to places outside the Sápmi vernacular region, such as Canada and the United States.

Groups of Sámi people have settled in the northern parts of Minnesota.

The Sami are a small minority in the Russian part of Sápmi.

As of 2016, 13,226 people inhabited the Sami native region of Finnish Lapland many of whom are Sami.

== Politics ==
Norway, Finland and Sweden all have Sámi Parliaments that to varying degrees are involved in governing the region—though mostly they only have authority over the matters of the Sámi citizens of the states in which they are situated.

=== Sámi Parliaments ===
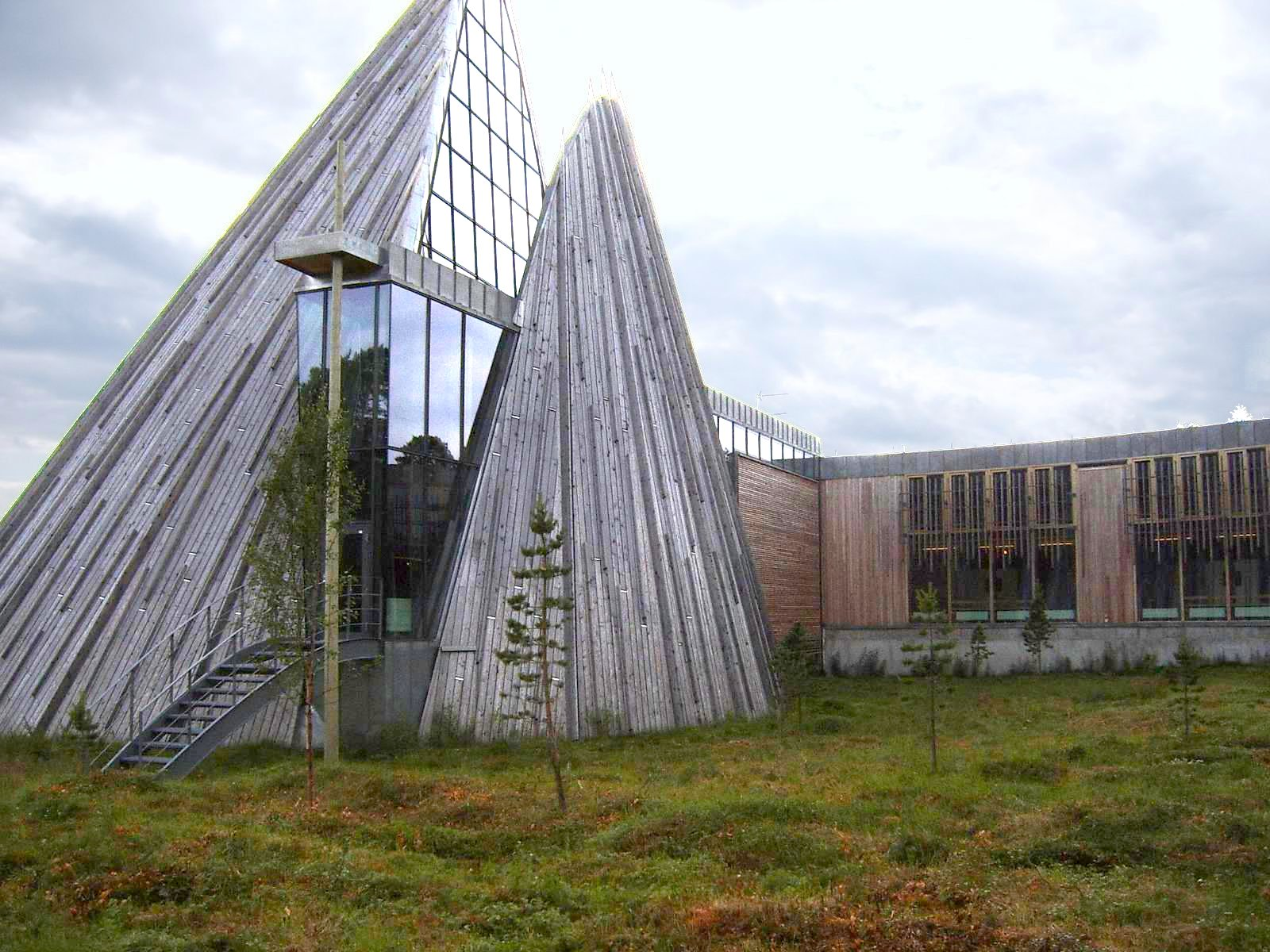
The Sámi Parliament of Norway

Every Norwegian citizen registered as a Sámi has the right to vote in the elections for the Sámi Parliament of Norway. Elections are held every four years by direct vote from seven constituencies covering all of Norway (six of which are in Sápmi) and run parallel to the general Norwegian parliamentary elections. This is the Sámi Parliament with the most influence over any part of Sápmi, as it is involved in the autonomy established by the Finnmark Act. The parliament is in the village of Kárášjohka and its current president is Silje Karine Muotka from the Norwegian Sámi Association.

The Sámi Parliament of Sweden, situated in Kiruna (Northern Sami: Giron), is elected by a general vote which all registered Sámi citizens of Sweden may attend. The current president is Lars-Anders Baer.

Every Sámi person in Finland who is registered in the election roll can vote in the elections of the Sámi Parliament of Finland. At least 12 of the 21 seats of the parliament are reserved for members from the Sámi Domicile Area. The Parliament is in Inari (Inari Sami: Aanaar), and its current president is Pirita Näkkäläjärvi [fi].

In Russia, there is no Sámi Parliament. Two Sámi organisations are members of the national umbrella organisation of Indigenous peoples, the Russian Association of Indigenous Peoples of the North (RAIPON), and represent the Russian Sámi in the Sámi Council. RAIPON is represented in Russia's Public Chamber by Pavel Sulyandziga. On 14 December 2008, the first Congress of the Russian Sámi took place. The Conference decided to demand the formation of a Russian Sámi Parliament, to be elected by the local Sámi. A suggestion to have the Russian Federation pick representatives for the Parliament was voted down with a clear majority. The Congress also chose a Council of Representatives that was to work for the establishment of a parliament and otherwise represent the Russian Sámi. It is headed by Valentina Sovkina.

=== Sámi Parliamentary Council ===
On 2 March 2000, the Sámi parliaments of Norway and Finland founded the Sámi Parliamentary Council, and the Sámi Parliament of Sweden joined two years later. Each parliament sends seven representatives, and observers are sent from the Sámi organisations of Russia and the Sámi Council. The Sámi Parliamentary Council discuss cross-border cooperation, hands out the annual Gollegiella language development award, and represents the Sámi people abroad.

=== Saami Council ===
In addition to the parliaments and their common council, there is a Saami Council based on Saami organisations. This council also organises interstate cooperation between the Saami, and also often represents the Saami in international fora such as the Barents Region. This organisation is older than the Parliamentary Council, but not connected to the parliaments except that some of the NGOs double as party lists in Sami parliament elections.

=== Russia ===
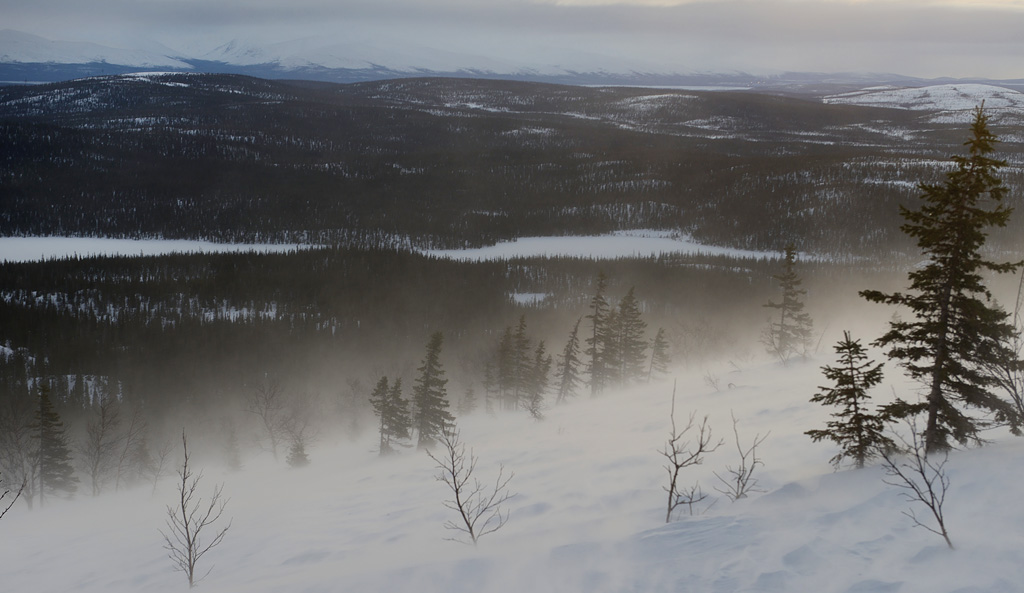
Lapland Nature Reserve, Russia

The Russian side of Sápmi is within Murmansk Oblast. Oblasts are governed by popularly elected parliaments and formally headed by governors. The governors are nominated by the president of Russia and accepted or rejected by the local parliaments. However, should the parliament refuse to accept the president's nominee, the president is entitled to dissolve parliament and call local elections.

Murmansk Oblast covers the Kola Peninsula and is home to Murmansk, the largest city north of the Arctic Circle and in the Sápmi. It is subdivided into several districts, of which the geographically largest is Lovozersky District. This is also part of Russia where the Sami population is most numerous and visible.

The Lapland Nature Reserve (Russian: Лапландский заповедник, Laplandskiy zapovednik) is a Russian zapovednik (strict nature reserve) in Murmansk Oblast, above the Arctic Circle. Its administrative centre is the rural locality of Laplandsky Zapovednik. First established between 1930-1951 and reestablished in 1957, the reserve protects an area of 2,784 km^{2} (1,075 sq mi) to the northwest of Lake Imandra, including 86 km^{2} of inland water.

=== Norway ===
The counties of Norway are governed by popularly elected assemblies, headed by county mayors. Formally, the counties are headed by county governors, but in practice, these have limited influence today.

The largest of Norway's landscapes, Finnmárku (Northern Sami) or Finnmark (Norwegian) county, is in Sápmi and has a special form of autonomy: 95% (about 46,000 km^{2} [18,000 sq mi]) of the area is owned by the Finnmark Estate. The board of the Estate consists of many representatives from the Sami Parliament of Norway and Finnmark's county council. The two institutions appoint leaders of the board alternately. The administrative centre of Finnmárku (Finnmark) is Čáhcesuolu or Vadsø, in the far east of the county. The current county governor is Runar Sjåstad from the Norwegian Labour Party.

Romsa (or Troms) county is southwest of Finnmárku. Its administrative centre is the city after which the county is named, Romsa or Tromsø. Romsa is North Norway's biggest city and Sápmi's biggest city after Murmansk. The current fylkesordfører is Terje Olsen from the Conservative Party. A similar solution to the Finnmark Estate, Hålogalandsallmenningen, has been proposed for Romsa County and its southern neighbour Nordlánda.

Nordland covers a long strip of coast that includes both North Sami, Julev Sami, Bithun Sami, and South Sami areas. Its administrative centre is Bådåddjo or Bodø. The current county governor is Mariette Korsrud from the Norwegian Labour Party.

The southernmost parts of Norwegian Sapmi lie in Trøndelag county (mostly the northern part of the county). The administrative centre is Steinkjer. The largest city in Trøndelag is Trondheim. Trondheim is outside Sápmi but is well known for being the site of the first international Sami conference in February 1917. The county governor is Frank Jenssen from the Conservative Party.

=== Sweden ===
Lapland is a large northwestern province of Sweden, wholly within Sápmi. The traditional provinces of Sweden are cultural and historical entities; for administrative and political purposes they were replaced by the counties of Sweden (län) in 1634.

Five counties are wholly or partially within Sápmi. Län is formally governed by the landshövding, who is an envoy of the government and runs the government-appointed länsstyrelse that coordinates administration with national political goals for the county. Much of county politics is run by the county council or landsting, which is elected by the inhabitants of the county; but the counties' top positions are still determined by those who win the general elections of Sweden.

Norrbotten County is mostly covered by Sápmi, although the lower Tornedalen region is often excluded. The administrative centre is Luleå in the Julev Sami area (Norrbotten includes North, Julev and Bithun areas). Current landshövding is Per-Ola Eriksson of the Centre Party.

Sápmi covers the interior majority of Västerbotten County, which are Ubmeje and South Sami regions. The administrative centre is Umeå, and the current landshövding is Chris Heister from the conservative Moderate Party.

Västernorrland County is an old part of Sapmi and still is. There are a lot of Sami on the coast of the Baltic Sea (Gulf of Bothnia).

Jämtland County is sometimes considered a part of the Sápmi cultural region and is a South Sami county. The administrative centre is Östersund. Current landshövding is Jöran Hägglund from the centre party Centerpartiet.

=== Finland ===
Finland is divided into nineteen regions (maakunta), each governed by regional councils. These councils serve as cooperative forums for municipalities rather than being elected through a direct popular vote. Lapland (Lappi, Lappland) is the northernmost region, extending further south than Sápmi and encompassing Southern Lapland (Peräpohjola, Nordbotten), historically regarded as the northernmost part of Ostrobothnia. The administrative centre is Rovaniemi. North Sami, Skolt Sami, and Aanaar Sami are Indigenous to the region.

Four municipalities, Anár (Inari), Eanodat (Enontekiö), Ohcejohka (Utsjoki) and Soađegilli (Sodankylä) in the northern part of Finnish Lapland constitute the Sami Domicile Area, Sámiid Ruovttoguovlu, a region that is autonomous on issues regarding Sami culture and language. Ohcejohka is the only municipality in Finland with a Sami majority.

=== Coats of arms of Sami communities ===
Coats of arms

Finnmárku (Norway)

Romsa (Norway)

Nordlánda (Norway)

Trööndelage (Norway)

Lapplánda
(Sweden)

Norrbottena
(Sweden)

Västerbottena
(Sweden)

Jämtlándda
(Sweden)

Härjedaelie
(Sweden)

Lappi
(Finland)

Murmánska
(Russia)

== Sports ==
The region has its own football team, the Sápmi football team, which is organised by FA Sápmi. It is a member of ConIFA and the host of the 2014 ConIFA World Football Cup. The Sápmi football team won the 2006 VIVA World Cup and hosted the 2008 event.

== Notable places ==
The following towns and villages have a significant Sami population or host Sami institutions. Norwegian, Swedish, Finnish, or Russian toponyms are in parentheses.

=== North Sámi area ===
- Deatnu (Tana) has a significant Sami population.
- Divtasvuodna (Tysfjord) is a centre for the Lule (Julev) Sami population. The Árran Lule-Sami centre is here.
- Eanodat (Enontekiö).
- Gáivuotna (Kåfjord) is an important centre for the Coastal Sami culture, which is host to the Riddu Riđđu international Indigenous festival each summer. The municipality has a Sami language centre and hosts the Ája Sami Centre. The opposition against Sami language and culture revitalization in Gáivuotna was infamous in the late 1990s and included Sami language road signs being shot to pieces repeatedly.
- Giron (Kiruna) is the seat of the Swedish Sami Parliament and the largest urban settlement in Swedish Lapland.
- Guovdageaidnu (Kautokeino): About 90% of the population speaks North Sami, and several Sami institutions are here. These include Beaivváš Sami Theatre, a Sami High School and Reindeer Herding School, the Sami University College, the Nordic Sami Research Institute, the Sami Language Board, the Resource Centre for the Rights of Indigenous People, and the International Centre For Reindeer Husbandry. In addition, several Sami media are based in Kautokeino. These include the Sami language newspaper Áššu and the DAT Sami publishing house/record company. Kautokeino also hosts the Sami Easter Festival. The Kautokeino rebellion in 1852 was one of the few Sami rebellions against the Norwegian government's oppression of the Sami.
- Jiellevárri or Váhčir (Gällivare)
- Johkamohkki (Jokkmokk) holds a large Sami market and festival the first weekend of every February. It is also the location of Ájtte.
- Kárášjohka (Karasjok) is the seat of the Norwegian Sami Parliament. Other important Sami institutions include NRK Sami Radio, the Sami Collections Museum, the Sami Art Centre, the Sami Specialist Library, the legal office of Middle Finnmark, the Inner Finnmark Child and Youth Psychiatric Policlinic, the Sami Specialist Medical Centre, and the Sami Health Research Institute. In addition, the Sápmi cultural park is in the township, and the Sami language Min Áigi newspaper is published here.
- Leavdnja (Lakselv) in Porsáŋgu (Porsanger) municipality is the location of the Finnmark Estate and the Ságat Sami newspaper. The Finnmarkseiendommen organisation owns and manages about 95% of the land in Finnmark, and 50% of its board members are elected by the Norwegian Sami Parliament.
- Ohcejohka (Utsjoki).
- Romsa or Tromsa (Tromsø) is the largest city in the Central Sami area and has a university that specialises in Sami subjects. It also has a notable and very active Sami population.
- Unjárga (Nesseby) is an important centre for the Coastal Sami culture. It is also the site for the Várjjat Sami Museum and the Norwegian Sami Parliament's Department of Culture and Environment. The first Sami to be elected into the Norwegian Parliament, Isak Saba, was born here.

=== South Sápmi ===
- Aarborte (Hattfjelldal) is a southern Sami centre with a southern Sami language school and a Sami culture centre.
- Arjeplog.
- Snåase (Snåsa) is a centre for the Southern Sami language and the only municipality in Norway where Southern Sami is an official language. The Saemien Sijte southern Sami museum is in Snåase.

=== East Sápmi ===
- Aanaar, Anár, or Aanar (Inari) is the seat of the Finnish Sami Parliament
- Lujávri (Lovozero) is the largest settlement of Sami on the Russian side.

== See also ==
- Sámi cuisine
- Environmental injustice in Europe
- French Geodesic Mission to Lapland
- Laestadian
- Lapland War
- Lapland Biosphere Reserve
