= Khibiny (disambiguation) =

Khibiny (Russian: Хиби́ны) may refer to:

- Khibiny Mountains
- Khibiny Airport
- Khibiny, Murmansk Oblast, a village in the Kola Peninsula, near the Khibiny Mountains
- Khibiny National Park
- Khibiny, code name for the L-175V Russian radioelectronic jamming system, named after the Khibiny Mountains
