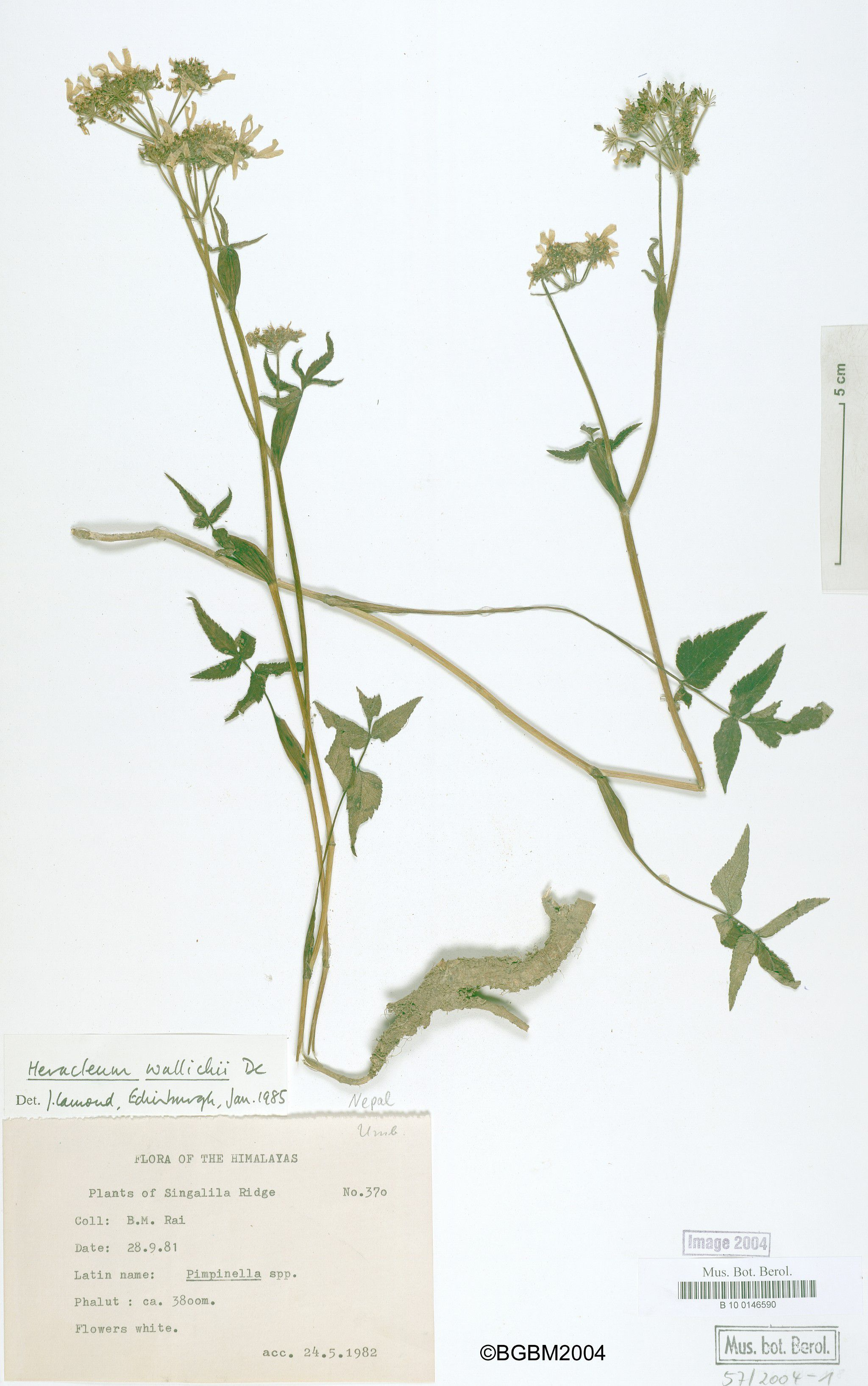
- Tetrataenium wallichii
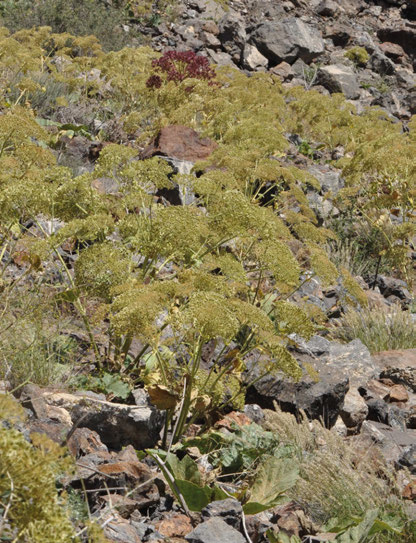
- Tetrataenietum olgae, Tajikistan

Scientific classification
- Kingdom: Plantae
- Clade: Embryophytes
- Clade: Tracheophytes
- Clade: Spermatophytes
- Clade: Angiosperms
- Clade: Eudicots
- Clade: Asterids
- Order: Apiales
- Family: Apiaceae
- Subfamily: Apioideae
- Tribe: Tordylieae
- Subtribe: Tordyliinae
- Genus: Tetrataenium (DC.) Manden.

= Tetrataenium =

Genus of flowering plants

Tetrataenium is a genus of flowering plants belonging to the family Apiaceae. Its native range is Turkey to Central Asia and Indo-China.

== Taxonomy ==
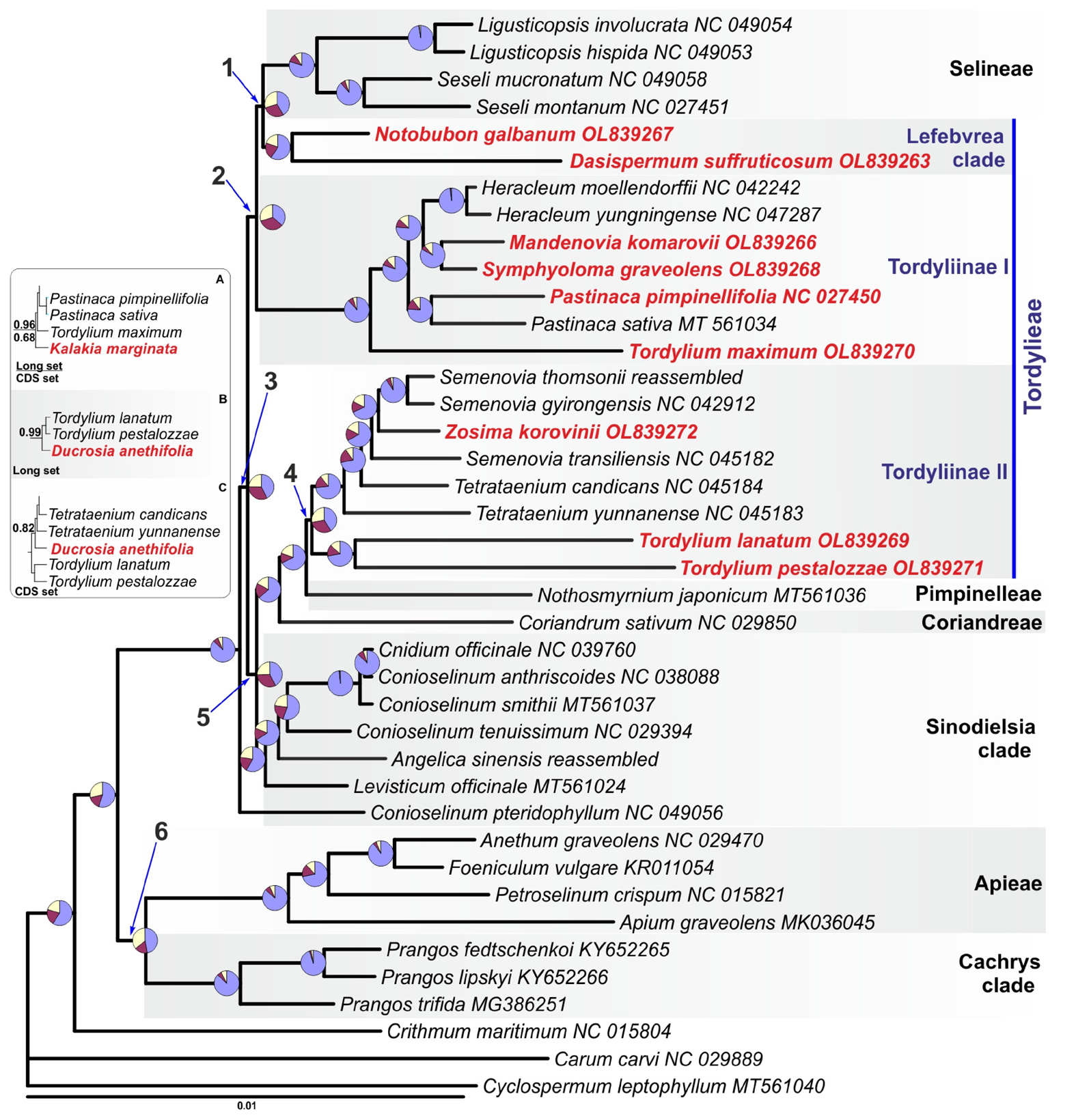
Phylogenetic tree of Tetrataenium.

Tetrataenium is a member of the family Apiaceae, a family mostly aromatic flowering plants. It forms a clade within this family with other genera like Semenovia and Zosmia. Closely related to this clade are other genera such as Tordylium, Nothosmyrnoum and Coriandrum. All are located within the polyphyletic group Tordylieae, specifically within group ll.

== Species ==
This is a large genus containing numerous species which are listed below:

- Tetrataenium aquilegifolium (C.B.Clarke) Manden.
- Tetrataenium birmanicum (Kurz) Manden.
- Tetrataenium bivittatum (H.Boissieu) Manden.
- Tetrataenium canescens (Lindl.) Manden.
- Tetrataenium cardiocarpum (Rech.f. & Riedl) Manden.
- Tetrataenium ceylanicum (Gardner ex C.B.Clarke) Manden.
- Tetrataenium grande (Dalzell & A.Gibson) Manden.
- Tetrataenium hookerianum (Wight & Arn.) Manden.
- Tetrataenium kumaonense Kljuykov & Ukrainsk.
- Tetrataenium lallii (C.Norman) Cauwet, Carb. & Farille
- Tetrataenium lasiopetalum (Boiss.) Manden.
- Tetrataenium leucocarpum (Aitch. & Hemsl.) Manden.
- Tetrataenium nepalense (D.Don) Manden.
- Tetrataenium nephrophyllum (Leute) Manden.
- Tetrataenium olgae (Regel & Schmalh.) Manden.
- Tetrataenium rigens (Wall. ex DC.) Manden.
- Tetrataenium sprengelianum (Wight & Arn.) Manden.
- Tetrataenium sublineare (C.B.Clarke) Manden.
- Tetrataenium wallichii (DC.) Manden.
- Tetrataenium yunnanense (Franch.) Manden. ex Q.Y.Xiao & X.J.He
