= Khibiny National Park =

National park of Russia

- (Russian: Хибины)
- IUCN category II (national park)
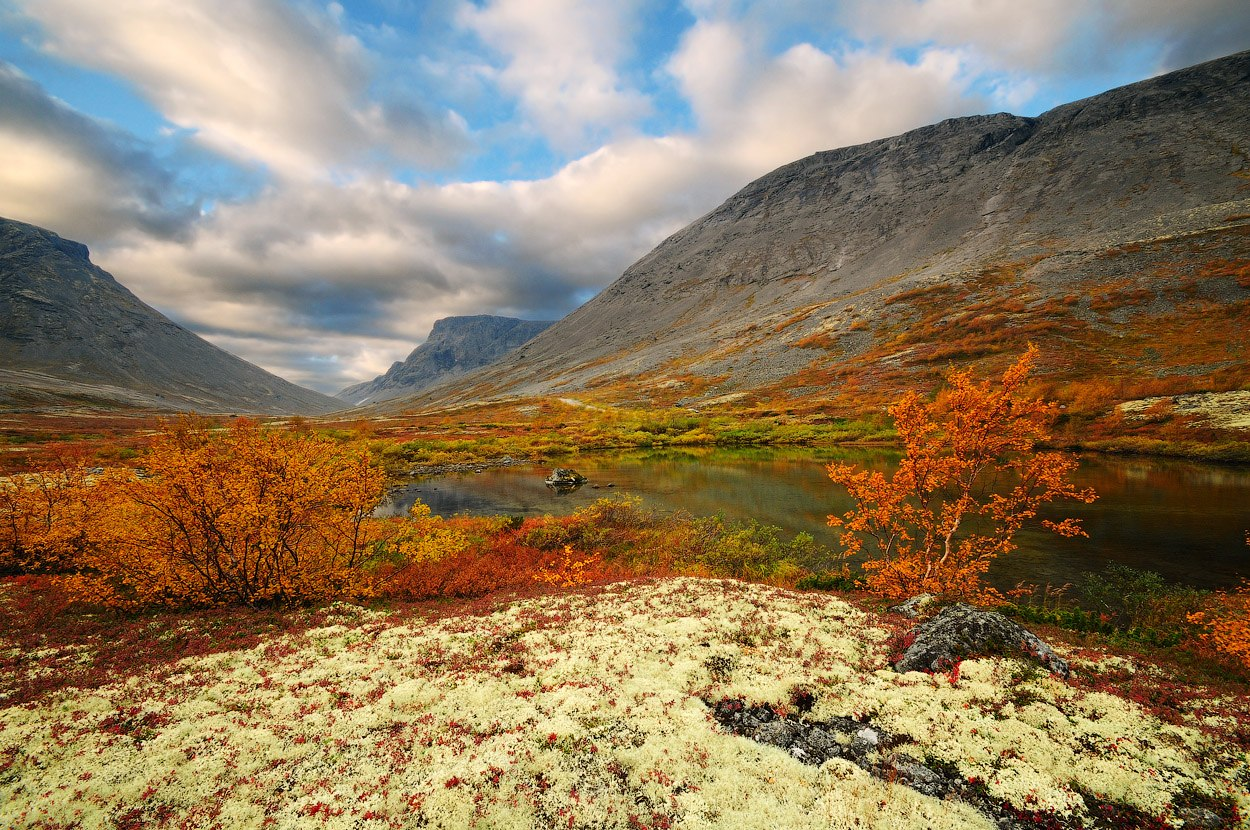
- Khibiny National Park

- Location within Russia
- Location: Murmansk Oblast
- Nearest city: Kandalaksha
- Coordinates: 67°43′N 33°28′E
- Area: 84,804 hectares (209,555 acres; 848 km^{2}; 327 sq mi)
- Established: 8 February 2018 (established) April 2019 (Merged into Lapland State Biosphere Reserve)
- Governing body: FGBU "Khibiny "

Khibiny National Park (Russian: Национальный парк «Хибины») protects a mountainous region of taiga and tundra on the Khibiny Mountains and Lovozero Massif of the western Kola Peninsula in northwestern Russia. The mountains contain commercially important minerals, and the park's borders reflect the need to balance three uses - protection of the unique natural environment, recreation (hiking in the summer, skiing in the winter), and industrial mining. The park was officially created in 2018, and is located in the districts of Kirovsk and Olenegorsk in Murmansk Oblast.

== Topography ==
Surrounded by low plains, the varied terrain of the mountains supports high biodiversity. The mountain range itself is a circle about 40 km across, with Lake Imandra on the western border, and Lake Umbozero on the eastern. The park has two sections - a west sector and an east sector of approximately equal size and a central valley corridor not in the protected zone. Across Lake Imandra to the west is the Lapland Biosphere Reserve. Elevations in the park range from 130 to 1,196 meters.

== Ecoregion and climate ==
The park is at the northern edge of the Scandinavian and Russian taiga ecoregion, only a few kilometers south of the official transition to the Kola Peninsula tundra ecoregion.

The climate of the ecoregion is Subarctic climate, without dry season (Köppen climate classification Subarctic climate (Dfc)). This climate is characterized by mild summers (only 1-3 months above 10 °C (50.0 °F)) and cold, snowy winters (coldest month below −3 °C (26.6 °F)).

Kandalaksha, Russia

Climate chart (precipitation, max. and min. temperature)
J	F	M	A	M	J	J	A	S	O	N	D
0 16 3	0.1 17 5	0.2 26 13	0.6 36 24	1.8 47 35	2.7 58 45	2.9 64 51	2.4 60 48	1.9 50 41	1.3 37 30	0.5 26 16	0.1 19 7
- █ Average max. and min. temperatures in °F
- █ Precipitation totals in inches
- Source: Weatherspark.com
Metric conversion
J	F	M	A	M	J	J	A	S	O	N	D
0 −9 −16	2.5 −8 −15	5.1 −3 −11	15 2 −4	46 8 2	69 14 7	74 18 11	61 16 9	48 10 5	33 3 −1	13 −3 −9	2.5 −7 −14
- █ Average max. and min. temperatures in °C
- █ Precipitation totals in mm

== Plants and animals ==
Ground cover in the park is 62% grassland, 27% forest, 8% bare rock, and the remaining 3% shrub cover or water. Species diversity is high, as there are different altitude zones, different landform types, and mixing of species in the transition zone between Arctic and taiga flora zones.

== See also ==
- Protected areas of Russia
