= Belaya (Lake Imandra) =

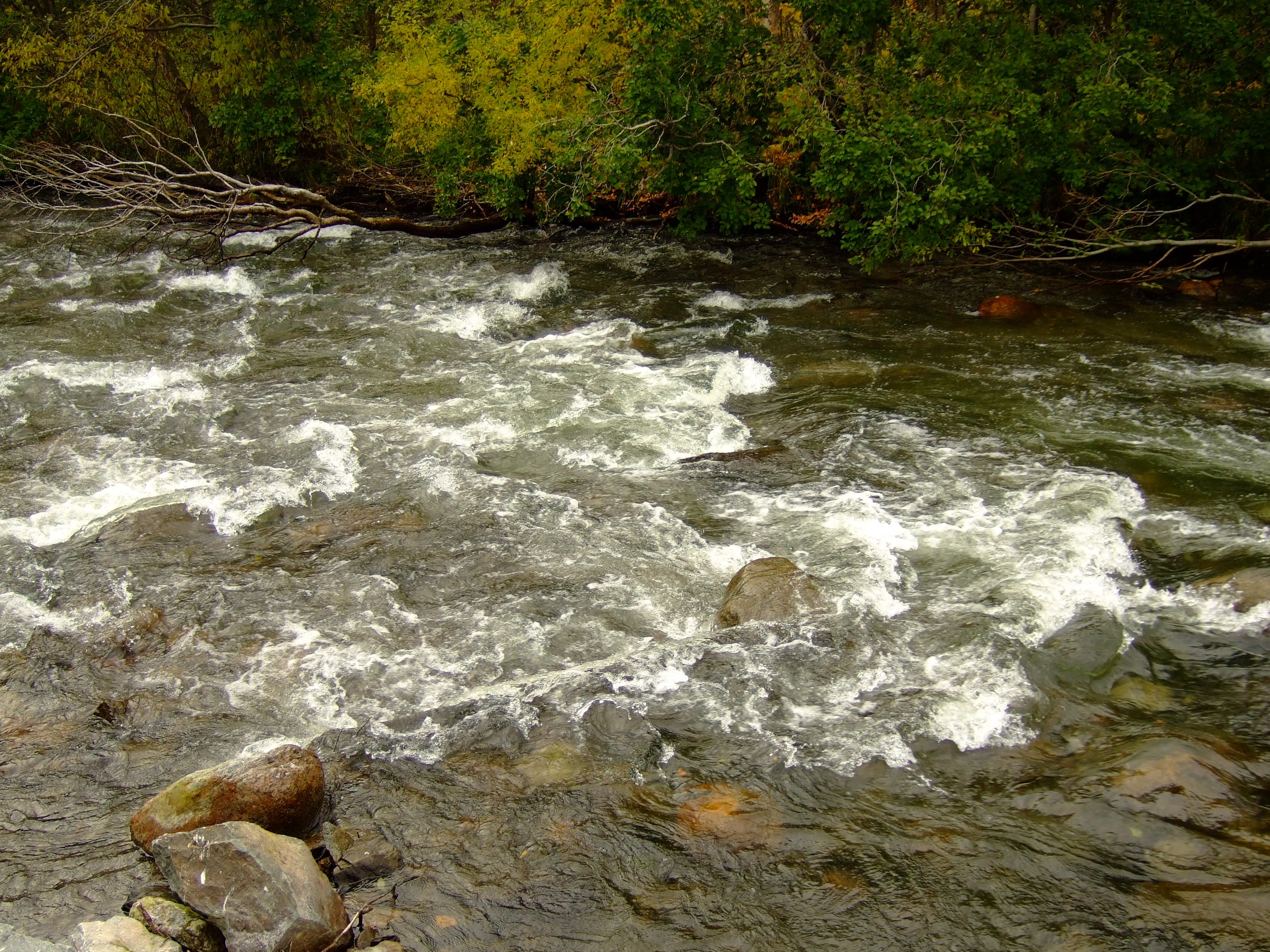

- Location within European Russia
- Native name: Белая (Russian)

Location
- Country: Russia
- Region: Murmansk Oblast

Physical characteristics
- Source
  - location: Lake Bolshoy Vudyavr
- Mouth: Lake Imandra
  - coordinates: 67.6454°N 33.1869°E
- Length: 30 km (19 mi)

Basin features
- Progression: Lake Imandra→ Niva→ White Sea

The Belaya (Russian: Белая) is a river in the center of the Kola Peninsula in Murmansk Oblast, Russia. It is 24 km in length. The Belaya originates in the Lake Bolshoy Vudyavr and flows into the Lake Imandra.
