= Polyarnye Zori =

Town in Murmansk Oblast, Russia

Polyarnye Zori Полярные Зори
- Town
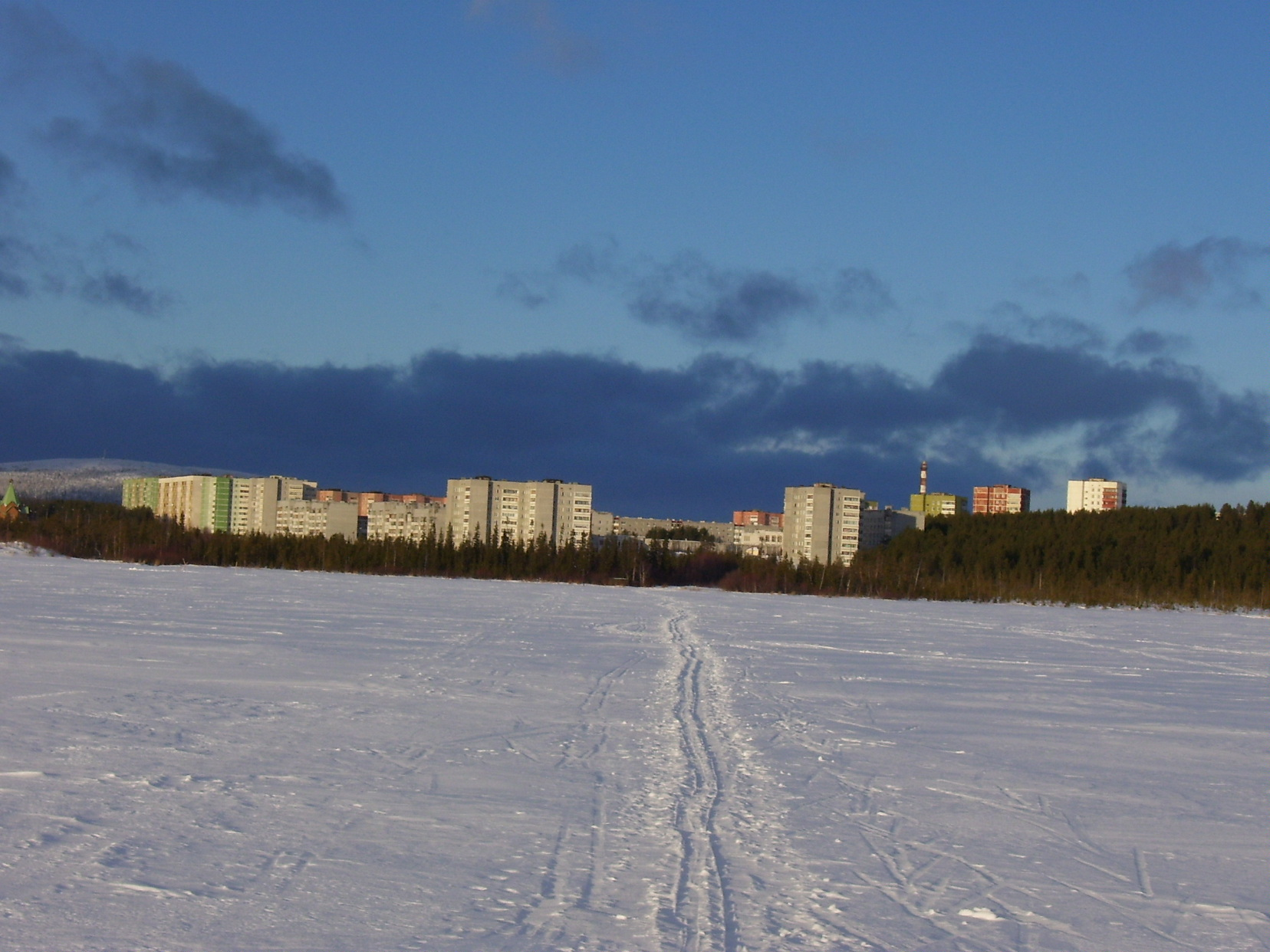

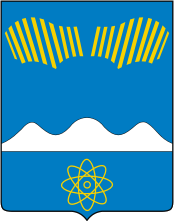
- Coat of arms
- Interactive map of Polyarnye Zori
- Location of Polyarnye Zori Polyarnye Zori (Murmansk Oblast)
- Coordinates: 67°22′N 32°30′E
- Country: Russia
- Federal subject: Murmansk Oblast
- Founded: 1968
- Town status since: April 22, 1991

Government
  - Mayor: Maxim Pukhov
- Elevation: 120 m (390 ft)

Population (2010 Census)
  - Total: 15,096
  - Estimate (2023): 14,078 (−6.7%)

Administrative status
  - Subordinated to: Polyarnye Zori Town with Jurisdictional Territory
  - Capital of: Polyarnye Zori Town with Jurisdictional Territory

Municipal status
  - Urban okrug: Polyarnye Zori Urban Okrug
  - Capital of: Polyarnye Zori Urban Okrug
- Time zone: UTC+3 (MSK)
- Postal code: 184230
- Dialing code: +7 81532
- OKTMO ID: 47719000001
- Website: www.pz-city.ru

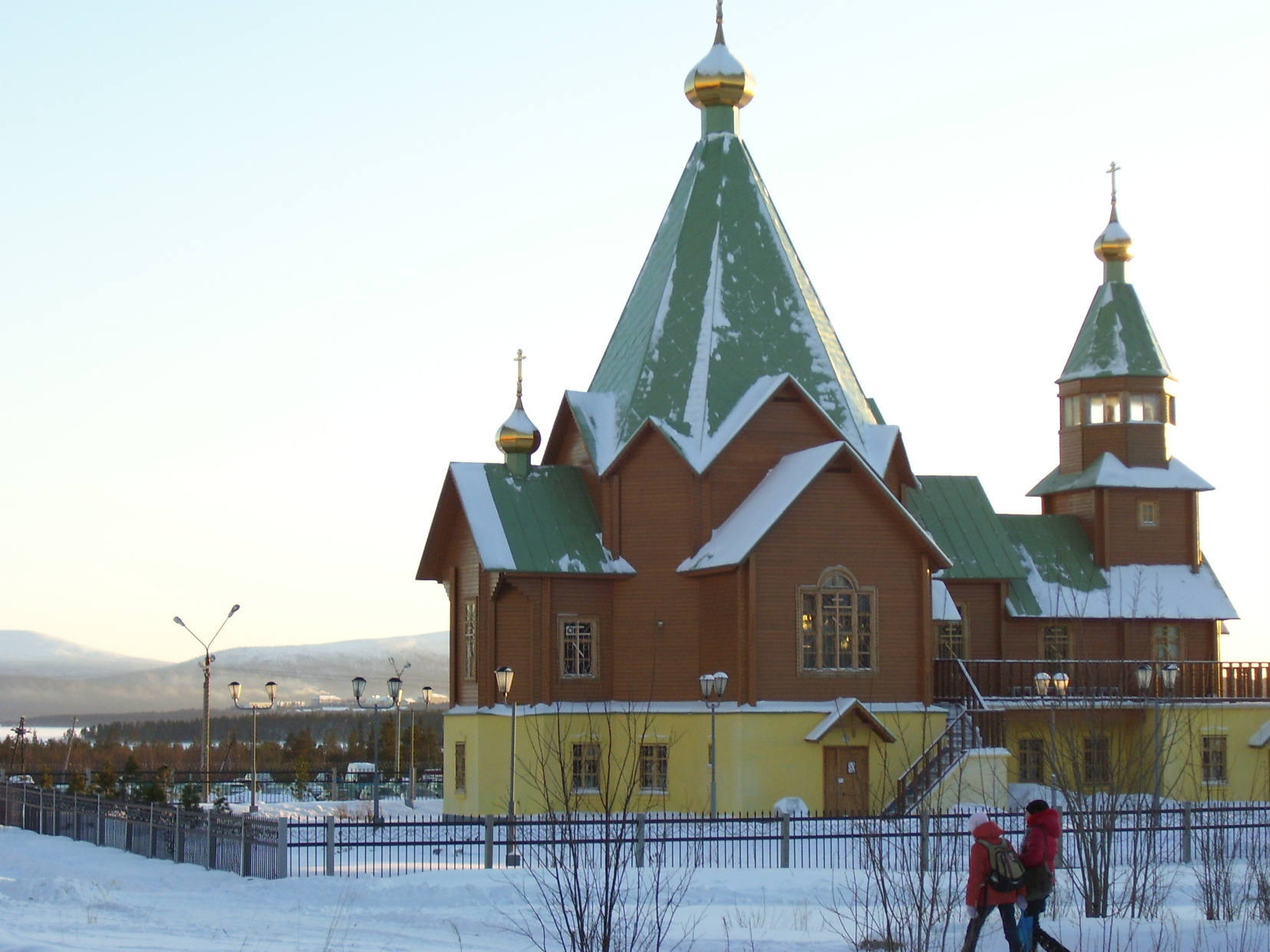
A church in Polyarnye Zori

Polyarnye Zori (Russian: Поля́рные Зо́ри, lit. polar dawns) is a town in Murmansk Oblast, Russia, located on the Niva River, Lake Imandra, and Lake Pinozero, 224 kilometers (139 mi) south of Murmansk. The nearest settlements to Polyarnye Zory are: Zasheek (3 km), Pinozero (4 km), Nivskiy (8 km) and Afrikanda-1,2 (16 and 13 km). Population : 14,196 (2020 Сensus), 15,096 (2010 census); 15,910 (2002 census); 19,428 (1989 Soviet census).

== History ==
Polyarnye Zori was founded in 1968 as a settlement for workers of the electric power industry due to the construction of the Kola Nuclear Power Plant. Initially a work settlement subordinated to the town of Apatity, it was elevated in status to that of a town under oblast jurisdiction by the Presidium of the Supreme Soviet of the Russian SFSR Decree of April 22, 1991. A part of the territory in jurisdiction of Apatity was also transferred to Polyarnye Zori by the Decision of the Presidium of the Murmansk Oblast Soviet of People's Deputies of May 16, 1991.

== Administrative and municipal status ==
Within the framework of administrative divisions, it is, together with two rural localities, incorporated as Polyarnye Zori Town with Jurisdictional Territory—an administrative unit with the status equal to that of the districts. As a municipal division, Polyarnye Zori Town with Jurisdictional Territory is incorporated as Polyarnye Zori Urban Okrug.

== Mayors of Polyarnye Zori ==
1. Lyudmila Chistova (1994–1998)
2. Valery Mironov (1998–2001)
3. Vladimir Goncharenko (2001–2005)
4. Nikolay Goldobin (2005–2013)
5. Maxim Pukhov (since 2013)

== Notable people ==
- Marina Sergina (born 1986 in Polyarnye Zori), ice hockey player
- Ivan Yershov (born 1979 in Polyarnye Zori), footballer
