= Apatity =

Town in Murmansk Oblast, Russia

Apatity Апатиты
- Town
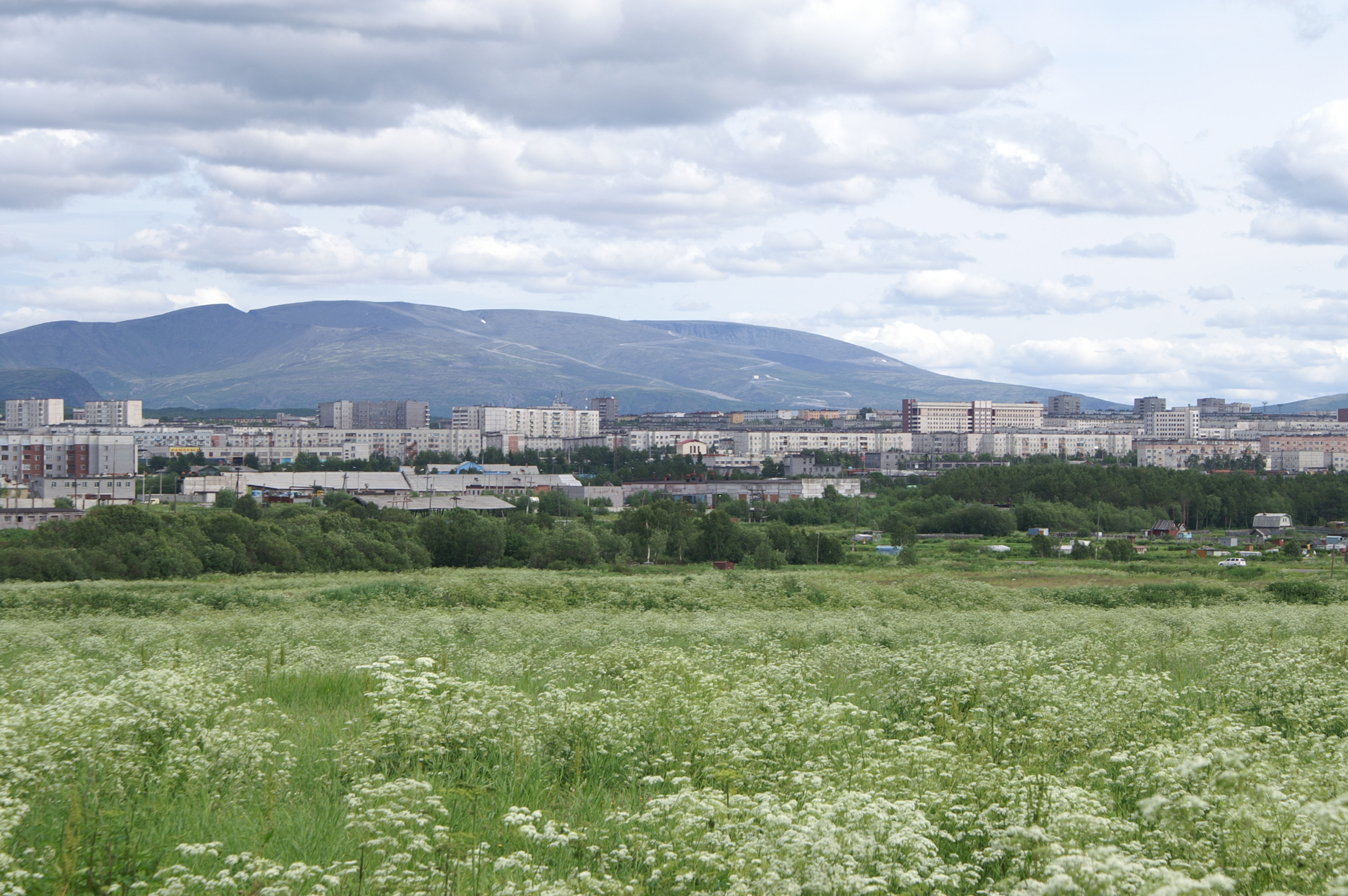
- Apatity and Khibiny Mountains

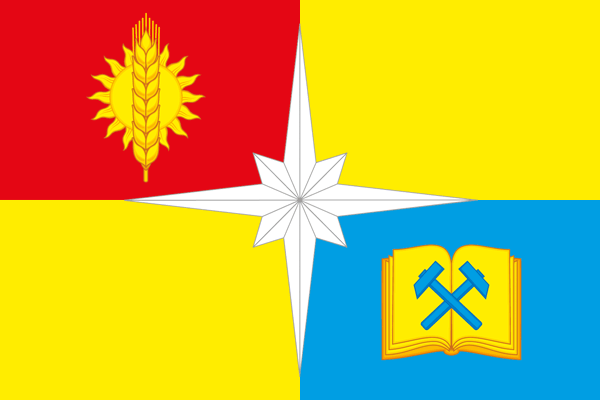
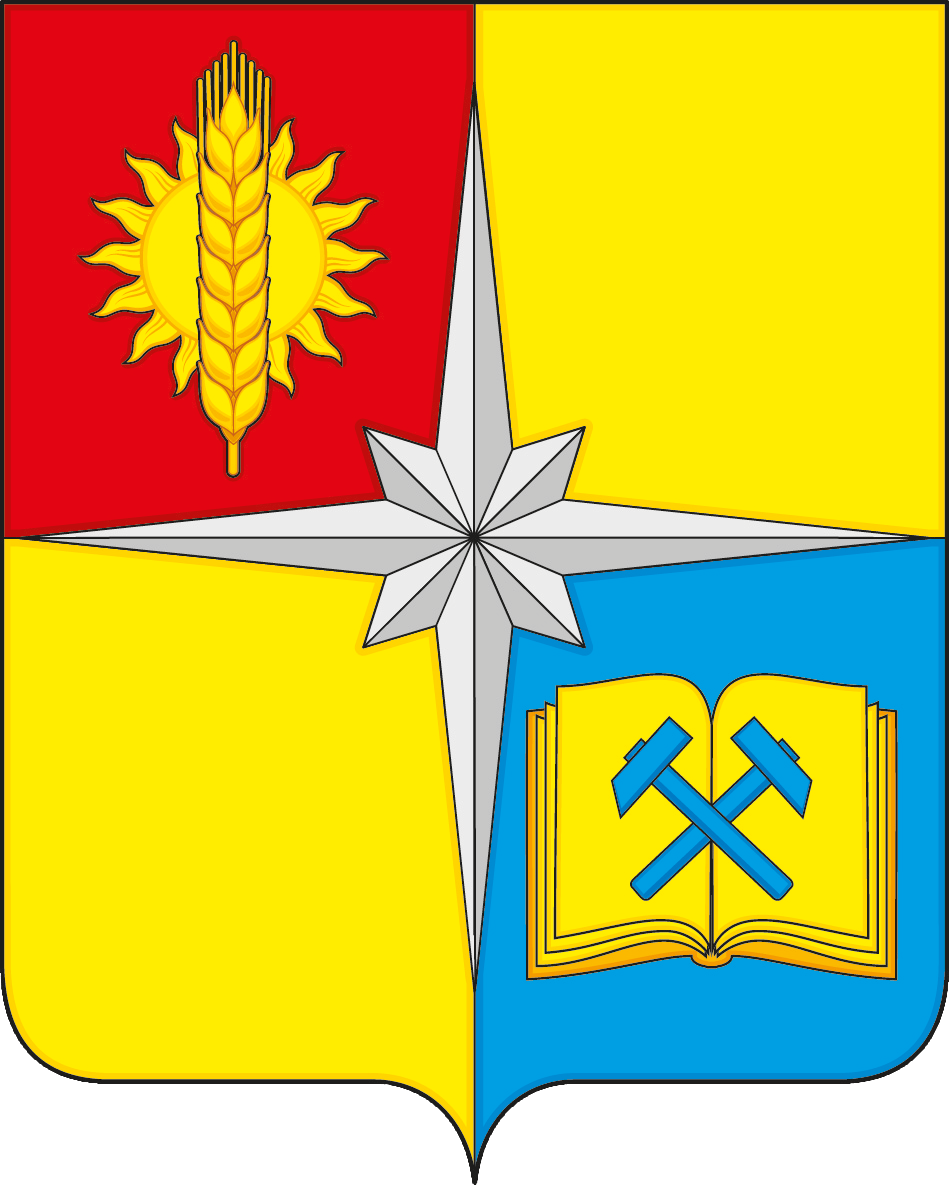
- Flag Coat of arms
- Interactive map of Apatity
- Location of Apatity Apatity (Murmansk Oblast)
- Coordinates: 67°34′N 33°24′E
- Country: Russia
- Federal subject: Murmansk Oblast
- Urban locality: 1935
- Town status since: July 7, 1966

Government
  - Mayor: Konstantin Gumenichenko
- Elevation: 170 m (560 ft)

Population (2010 Census)
  - Total: 59,672
  - Estimate (2025): 48,410 (−18.9%)
  - Rank: 276th in 2010

Administrative status
  - Subordinated to: Apatity Town with Jurisdictional Territory
  - Capital of: Apatity Town with Jurisdictional Territory

Municipal status
  - Urban okrug: Apatity Urban Okrug
  - Capital of: Apatity Urban Okrug
- Time zone: UTC+3 (MSK)
- Postal code: 184209
- Dialing code: +7 81555
- OKTMO ID: 47705000001
- Website: apatity.gov-murman.ru

Apatity (Note: [əpɐˈtʲitɨ]) (Russian: Апатиты, lit. 'apatites') is a town in Murmansk Oblast, Russia, located along the Murman Railway, 23 km (14 mi) west of Kirovsk and 185 km (115 mi) south of Murmansk, the administrative center of the oblast. It is the second-largest city in Murmansk Oblast after Murmansk, and the fifth most-populous city in the world above the Arctic Circle. The town is named after one of its most abundant natural resources in the area, apatite, the raw mineral used in the production of phosphorus mineral fertilizers. Population: 59,672 (2010 census).

Historical population
Year	Pop.	±%
1939	4,409	—
1959	13,958	+216.6%
1970	45,627	+226.9%
1979	62,010	+35.9%
1989	88,026	+42.0%
2002	64,405	−26.8%
2010	59,672	−7.3%
2021	49,647	−16.8%
Population size may be affected by changes in administrative divisions. Source: Censuses

== Geography ==
The town is located on the Kola Peninsula, between Lake Imandra and the Khibiny Mountains, by the left bank of the Belaya River.

== History ==
The passing loop of Bely (разъезд Бе́лый) on the Leningrad–Murmansk Railway was built in 1926 and the settlement of Apatity was founded in 1930. It was classified as an urban locality by the All-Russian Central Executive Committee (VTsIK) Resolution of August 20, 1935, when the settlement of pri sovkhoze "Industriya" was merged into Apatity and it was granted work settlement status.

Many of the early settlers in the Apatity area were former "rich peasants" from several regions of Northwestern Russia, resettled to Murmansk Oblast as part of Stalin's Dekulakization program. Members of certain ethnic minorities were deported to Apatity as well.

On January 6, 1966, the Murmansk Oblast Executive Committee petitioned to transform the work settlement of Molodyozhny in jurisdiction of Kirovsk into a town under oblast jurisdiction called Khibinogorsk and on subordinating a part of the area in Kirovsk's jurisdiction to it. The petition was reviewed by the Presidium of the Supreme Soviet of the Russian SFSR, which, however, decreed on July 7, 1966 to merge the work settlements of Molodyozhny and Apatity into a town under oblast jurisdiction, which would retain the name Apatity. Consequently, the Murmansk Oblast Executive Committee subordinated a part of the territory in Kirovsk's jurisdiction to the new town by the decision of October 13, 1966.

By the November 29, 1979 Decree by the Presidium of the Supreme Soviet of the Russian SFSR, Kovdorsky District was formed from the parts of the territory in Apatity's jurisdiction. The work settlement of Polyarnye Zori subordinated to Apatity was elevated in status to that of a town under oblast jurisdiction by another Decree of April 22, 1991. A part of the territory in jurisdiction of Apatity was also transferred to Polyarnye Zori by the Decision of the Presidium of the Murmansk Oblast Soviet of People's Deputies of May 16, 1991.

== Administrative and municipal status ==
Within the framework of administrative divisions, it is, together with two rural localities, incorporated as Apatity Town with Jurisdictional Territory—an administrative unit with the status equal to that of the districts. As a municipal division, Apatity Town with Jurisdictional Territory is incorporated as Apatity Urban Okrug.

== Economy ==
The main employer of Apatity is JSC "Apatit", the largest mining and concentrating enterprise in Europe and Russia. Other employers include the Kola Science Center of the Russian Academy of Science and various state and private enterprises.

The joint civilian-military Kirovsk-Apatity Airport is located 15 kilometers (9.3 mi) southeast of the town

== Museums ==
- Museum of Investigation and Development History of the European North of Russia (International Cultural Center of KSC RAS);
- Museum of regional studies and history (municipal);
- Geological museum (KSC RAS);
- Mineralogical museum (The Institute of Geology KSC RAS)

== Notable people ==
- Larisa Arap, psikhushka whistleblower
- Maxim Kononenko, journalist
- Andrey Malakhov, television personality
- Fedor Fedorov (ice hockey), ice hockey forward

== International relations ==
=== Twin towns and sister cities ===
Apatity is twinned with:

- Alta, Norway
- Boden Municipality, Sweden
- Keminmaa, Finland
