= Kola Canal =

Proposed canal

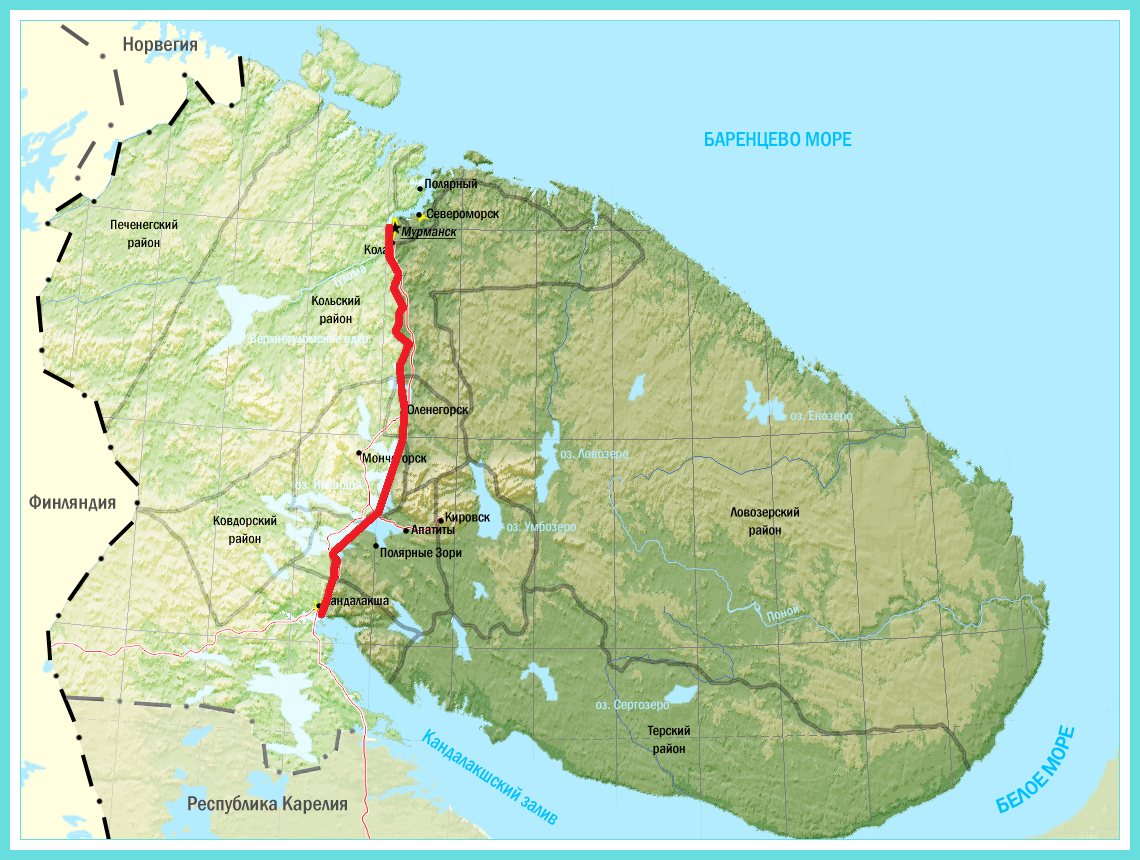
Kola Canal

The Kola Canal (Russian: Кольский канал), or sometimes the Kolsky Canal, was a proposed canal intended to link up the basin of the Kola River in the north of Kola Peninsula with the basin of the Niva River in the south of Kola Peninsula.

An accomplishment of this project would shorten the route of warships from the Barents Sea to the Baltic Sea.

== See also ==
- Kola Railway

== Sources ==
- Кольский канал — сказка, не ставшая былью
- КАК СПРОЕКТИРОВАЛИ И ПОХОРОНИЛИ КОЛЬСКИЙ КАНАЛ
- Арктика за гранью фантастики. Будущее Севера глазами советских инженеров, изобретателей и писателей
