= Oleg Semyonov-Tyan-Shansky =

Soviet ornithologist (1906–1990)

Oleg Izmailovich Semyonov-Tyan-Shansky Олег Измайлович Семёнов-Тян-Шанский;
- Born: 15 October 1906
- Died: 21 September 1990 (aged 83)
- Known for: Founder of the Lapland nature reserve
- Father: Izmail Petrovich
- Relatives: Pyotr Semyonov-Tyan-Shansky (grandfather), Andrey Semyonov-Tyan-Shansky (uncle)
- Awards: Order of the Red Banner of Labour
- Scientific career
- Fields: Ornithology
- Workplaces: Zoological Institute of the Russian Academy of Sciences, Leningrad; Pechora-Ilych Nature Reserve, Komi Republic (Russia)

Oleg Izmailovich Semyonov-Tyan-Shansky (Russian: Олег Измайлович Семёнов-Тян-Шанский; 15 October 1906 – 21 September 1990) was a Soviet ornithologist, naturalist, biologist and a founder of the Lapland nature reserve.

== Life and work ==
Semyonov-Tyan-Shansky was the son of Izmail Petrovich, a meteorologist and his wife, who was the daughter of a Moscow physician. He was the grandson of the explorer Pyotr Semyonov-Tyan-Shansky and a nephew of the entomologist Andrey Semyonov-Tyan-Shansky. He grew up in Petrograd until 1917, when his family moved to Petrovka in Tambov. In 1929, the family returned to Leningrad, where his father got work as a meteorologist.

In 1930, Semyonov-Tyan-Shansky moved to the Kola Peninsula as a research assistant and was then sent to the Lapland reserve to make scientific observations. Here he examined reindeer populations, was involved in the introduction of muskrats and beavers; and wrote several reports.

During World War II Semyonov-Tyan-Shansky was considered unfit for field service but was enrolled in a reserve rifle regiment and taught English to officers. After the war, he received a Medal "For Battle Merit" and an Order of the Red Star for his military service.

After the war, Semyonov-Tyan-Shansky worked at Leningrad at the Zoological Institute of the Russian Academy of Sciences, along with his wife, Maria Ivanovna Vladimirskaya, an ichthyologist. The couple went on several expeditions including to the Curonian Spit. In 1951 he worked at the Pechora-Ilych Nature Reserve while the Lapland reserve was denotified. He then worked to restore the reserve which happened in 1965.

As an ornithologist Semyonov-Tyan-Shansky studied black grouse and studied the hatching of their eggs using a special instrument that he designed.

Two months before his death, he received an Order of the Red Banner of Labour.
