= Maxim Kononenko =

Russian writer (1971–2024)

- Максим Кононенко
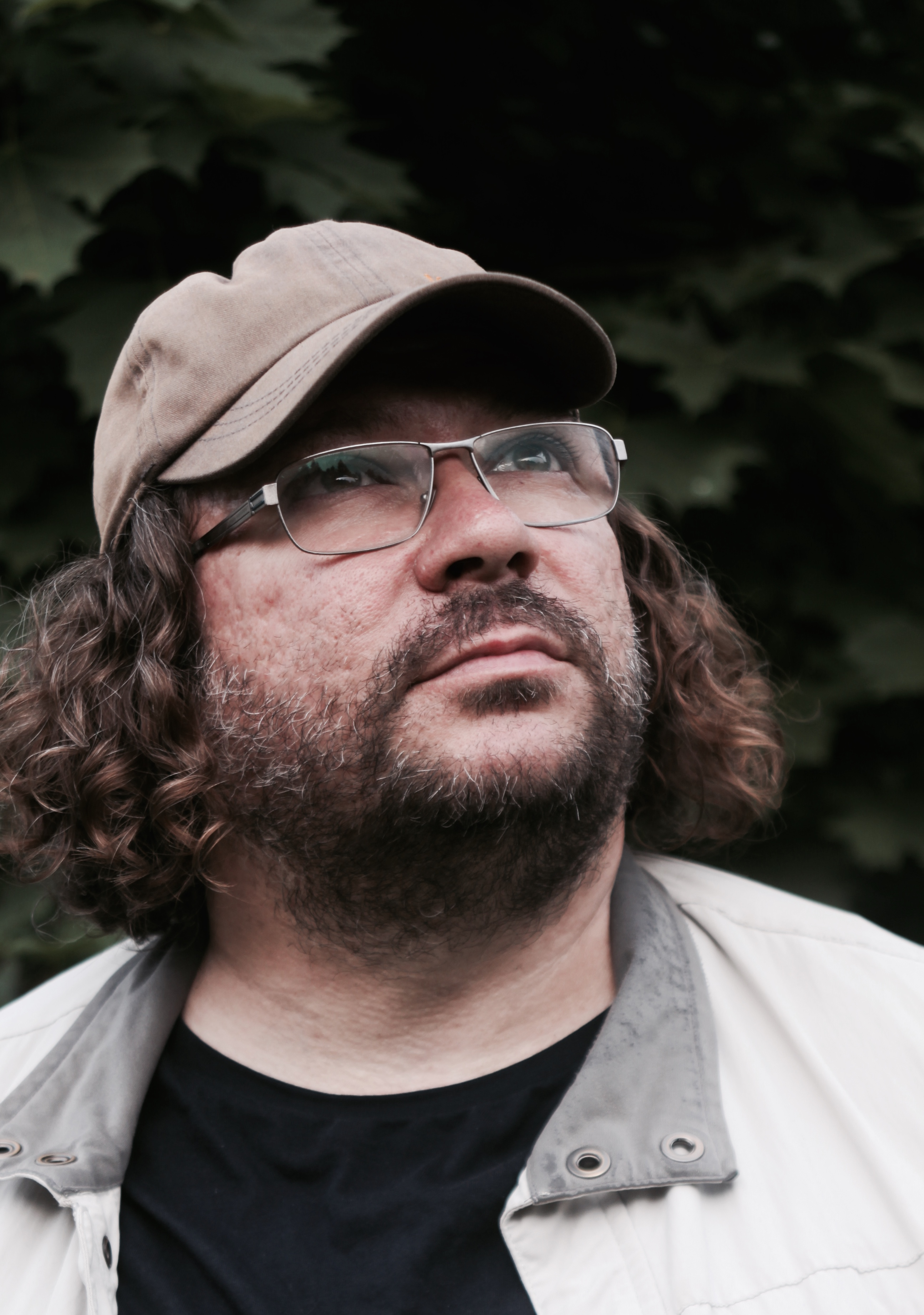
- Kononenko in 2016
- Born: 13 March 1971; Apatity, Murmansk Oblast, Russian SFSR, USSR
- Died: 14 May 2024 (aged 53); Moscow, Russia
- Resting place: Gubtsevo, Moscow
- Education: Moscow State Institute of Radio-engineering Electronics and Automation; Maxim Gorky Literature Institute
- Occupation: Journalist
- Political party: Civilian Power

Maksim Vitalievich Kononenko (Russian: Максим Витальевич Кононенко; 13 March 1971 – 14 May 2024) was a Russian journalist, writer and television show host.

Kononenko was also a political activist and a member of the council of the party Civilian Power.

== Biography ==
Kononenko was born in Apatity, USSR. He graduated from Moscow State Institute of Radio-engineering Electronics and Automation and also studied at Maxim Gorky Literature Institute. He authored or participated in numerous Internet projects and was known under the nickname Mr. Parker. For nearly ten years, he worked as the leading programmer in ParallelGraphics.

Kononenko participated in the 2005 Moscow City Duma elections but failed.

Until 2009, he worked as editor-in-chief of a major Internet news website Dni.ru. He was also editor-in-chief of Bourgeois Journal and the political newspaper Re:Action until his death.

In 2002, he founded a popular website vladimir.vladimirovich.ru, which contains humorous fake stories from the life of Vladimir Putin based on real events and current news.

Kononenko often appeared on Russian television and hosted a show Real Politics on NTV channel.

In February 2008, the administration of LiveJournal froze the blog that Kononenko had been running for seven years for publishing an opinion that the UK should be bombed.

In 2011, he repeatedly spoke favorably about 'doghunters' – representatives of the emerging subculture engaged in the destruction of packs of stray dogs.

In December 2011, the website of the newspaper Vzglyad published an author's column by Kononenko, in which he criticized the organizers and participants of the rallies against election fraud.

Kononenko died in Moscow on 14 May 2024, at the age of 53, reportedly from severe bleeding due to esophageal varices, a condition normally caused by cirrhosis.

== Awards ==
- Teneta Literary Award (1st prize, 1995)
- Computer programmer of the year and Person of the year (ROTOR, 2000)
- Internet Writer of the Year (2003, 2004)
