= Pyotr Semyonov-Tyan-Shansky =

Russian geographer and statistician (1827–1914)

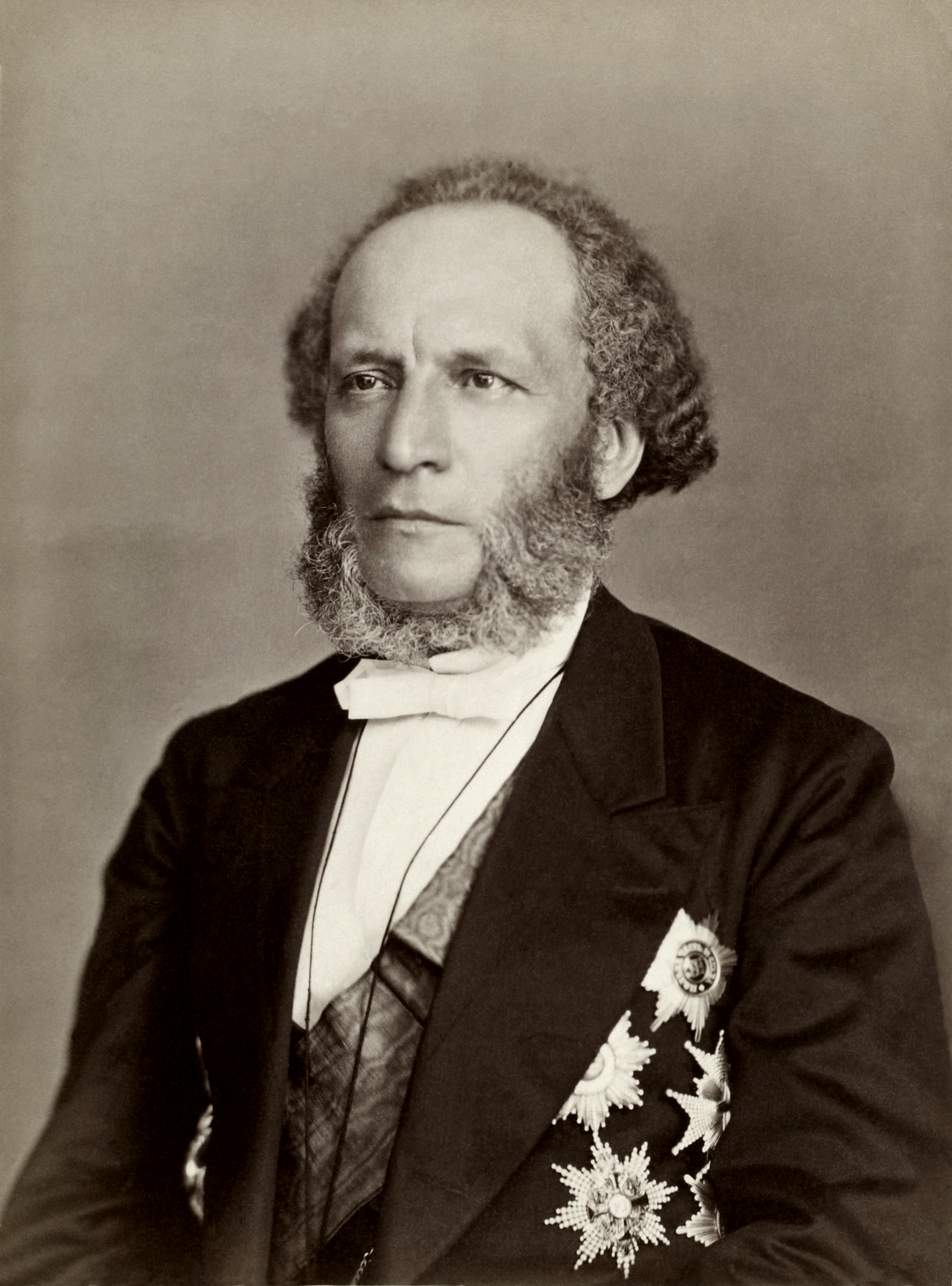
Pyotr Semyonov in the 1870s.

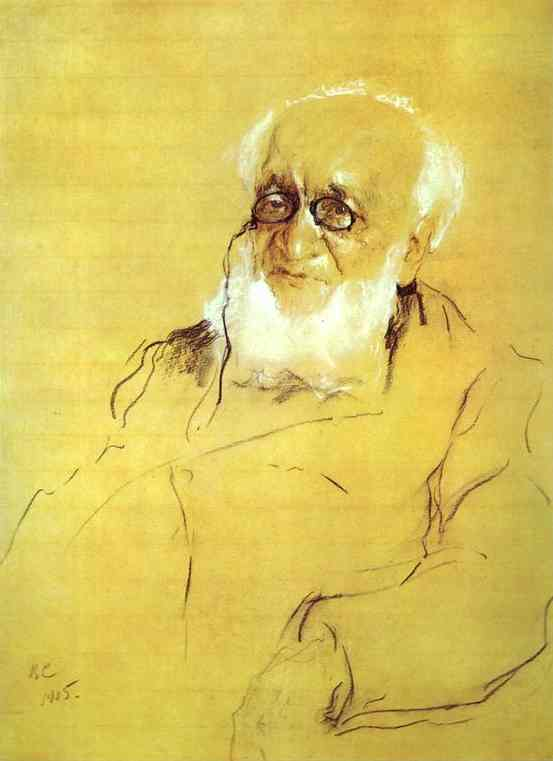
Portrait by Valentin Serov (1905).

Pyotr Petrovich Semyonov or Semenov (Russian: Пётр Петрович Семёнов; 2 January (New style: 14 January), 1827 – 26 February (New style: 11 March), 1914) was a Russian geographer and statistician who managed the Russian Geographical Society for more than 40 years. He gained international fame for his pioneering exploration of the Tian Shan mountains. He changed his surname to "Semyonov of Tian Shan" (Семёнов-Тян-Шанский, Semyonov-Tyan-Shansky) at the age of 79.

Several of his descendants, including a son, Andrey Semyonov-Tyan-Shansky, a daughter, Olga Semyonova-Tyan-Shanskaya, and a grandson Oleg Semyonov-Tyan-Shansky became scientists of note.

== Life ==
Pyotr Semyonov was born into a noble family and studied at Saint Petersburg University. Together with Fyodor Dostoyevsky, Semyonov attended secret meetings of the "Petrashevsky Circle" (a literary discussion group of progressive-minded commoner-intellectuals in St. Petersburg). During the 1850s he studied geography and geology in Berlin under Alexander Humboldt and Carl Ritter, whose writings he translated into Russian.

On Humboldt's suggestion, Semyonov determined to explore the largely unknown mountains of the Tian Shan. In 1856, he set off from Barnaul on his first expedition, passing through the Altay Mountains and visiting Lake Issyk Kul on his way. In 1857, he returned to the Tian Shan, exploring the interior of this hitherto unknown mountain range. Semyonov was the first European to see the scenic panorama of the Tengri Tag, and its most beautiful peak, the colossal Khan Tengri.

One of his most interesting discoveries was to disprove Humboldt's earlier claims about Tian Shan's supposed volcanic origins. Semenov found no evidence of volcanic activity anywhere in the mountains. The next year, he published the first systematic description of the Tian Shan. The reputation of this monograph was such that half a century later Nicholas II of Russia authorized him to add the epithet "Tian-Shansky" (that is, "of Tian Shan") to his last name.

Semyonov also became interested in statistics and did his best to advance this discipline in Russia. He served as Chairman of the Central Committee for Statistics from 1864 until 1874, when it was transformed into the Statistical Committee of the Ministry of Interior, of which he remained chairman until 1891. It was largely due to his efforts that the first census of the Russian Empire was held in 1897. The same year, he was made a member of the State Council of Imperial Russia.

Semyonov was a member of 53 learned societies and managed the Russian Geographical Society from 1873 until his death, using this position to encourage the exploration of inland Asia, notably by Nikolai Przhevalsky and Pyotr Kozlov. Semyonov's memoirs were published after his death in four volumes.

== Collections ==
During his frequent visits to Switzerland, Italy, and France, Semyonov—a man of considerable fortune—amassed a collection of old Dutch masters, and he became knowledgeable enough to be considered an expert on the paintings in his own and other large collections in St. Petersburg. He contributed to the 1895 update of the catalog of the Hermitage, the Dutch-Flemish-German version of which lists over 1000 paintings. He donated his collection to the Hermitage Museum where it still resides, though some of the more prominent ones were sold by the Soviets in the 1930s.

His insect collection consisted of ca. 700,000 specimens, while more than a hundred new species were named after him.

== Tributes ==
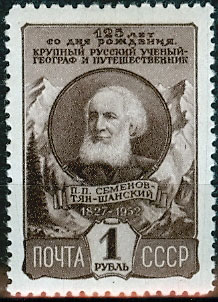
Semyonov-Tyan-Shansky on a 1952 Soviet stamp

- In 1866, botanists Regel & Herder described Semenovia, which is a genus of flowering plants from Central Asia and China, belonging to the family Apiaceae. It was named in his honour.
- The 4895m Semenov-Tian-Shansky Peak and the 5816m Semyonov Peak are named after him.
- On 14 January 2021, Google celebrated his 194th birthday with a Google Doodle.
