= Tetrataenium nepalense =

Scientific classification
- Kingdom: Plantae
- Clade: Tracheophytes
- Clade: Angiosperms
- Clade: Eudicots
- Clade: Asterids
- Order: Apiales
- Family: Apiaceae
- Genus: Tetrataenium
- Species: T. nepalense

Binomial name
- Tetrataenium nepalense (D. Don) Manden

Synonyms
- Heracleum nepalense D. Don.; Heracleum nepalense var. bivittatum C.B. Clarke

Species of flowering plant

Tetrataenium nepalense is a species of flowering plant in the carrot family Apiaceae. It is known as Nepal cowparsnip in the literature on Traditional Chinese Medicine.

== Uses ==
The species is common in the Sikkim and Darjeeling districts of India. Known as chimphing in the Nepali language, it is considered medicinal for stomach ailments. Its seeds are ground with tomato and taken as a relish, especially with boiled vegetables.
