= Vzglyad (newspaper) =

Russian online newspaper

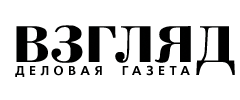
- Owner: Expert Institute for Social Research
- Founder: Konstantin Rykov
- Founded: 2005
- Language: Russian
- Website: vz.ru

Vzglyad (Russian: Взгляд, pronounced [vzɡlʲat], "View") is a Russian online newspaper, which was produced by Konstantin Rykov.

== History ==
In July 2005 Delovaya Gazeta Vzglyad established the free online newspaper Vzglyad. Konstantin Rykov launched Vzglyad as competition to Kommersant and Vedomosti.

The site started working on May 23, 2005, with the first paper edition "Vzglyad.ru" being published in November 2006. Several journalists, including Maxim Kononenko, Vladimir Mamontov and Tina Kandelaki, wrote columns for Vzglyad.

In 2013, Alexander Shmelev, the former editor-in-chief of the newspaper (2007-2008), stated that after the parliamentary and presidential elections of 2007 and 2008, "it was then that we found ourselves at the forefront of this campaign, and it was through us that the toughest propaganda materials passed, as a result of which the word 'Vzglyad' itself became negative in blogs and social networks" and that the work of the site was supervised at monthly intervals by Rykov and then by Alexei Chesnakov, the deputy head of the internal policy department of the Russian President.

Since 2013 the owner of the publication has been the Institute for Socio-Economic and Political Studies (ISEPI), headed by former deputy head of the internal policy department of the presidential administration Dmitri Badovsky. Since August 17, 2017, the publication has been under the control of the Expert Institute for Social Research, which is associated with the Russian Presidential Administration headed by Anton Vaino.

At the same time, Aleksei Sharavskyi, who had been heading the publication for ten years, was replaced by Konstantin Kondrashin as the editor-in-chief of the publication. In March 2020, Vzglyad published an article by media manager Alexander Malkevich, who has been called a "Russian troll" and who has been sanctioned by the US Government for interference in American elections, accusing Wikipedia editorial staff of an information war against Russia. Malkevich claimed that the deletion of an article "Sale of the administration of Russian-speaking Wikipedia" in Wikipedia (according to Malkevich the article was deleted as vandalism), created by the pro-government project "Anti-Propaganda" was evidence of this "information war".

== Chief editors ==
- Alexey Goreslavsky (2005-2006)
- Alexander Shmelev (2007-2008)
- Alexey Sharavsky (2008-2018)
- Konstantin Kondrashin (since 2018)
