= Nothosmyrnium =

Scientific classification
- Kingdom: Plantae
- Clade: Tracheophytes
- Clade: Angiosperms
- Clade: Eudicots
- Clade: Asterids
- Order: Apiales
- Family: Apiaceae
- Subfamily: Apioideae
- Tribe: Pimpinelleae
- Genus: Nothosmyrnium; Miq.

Genus of plants

Nothosmyrnium is a genus of flowering plants belonging to the family Apiaceae.

Its native range is China to Japan.

== Species ==
Species:

- Nothosmyrnium japonicum Miq.
- Nothosmyrnium xizangense R.H.Shan & T.S.Wang
