= Kirovsk–Apatity Airport =

Airport in Russia

Kirovsk–Apatity Airport Аэропорт Кировск/Апатиты

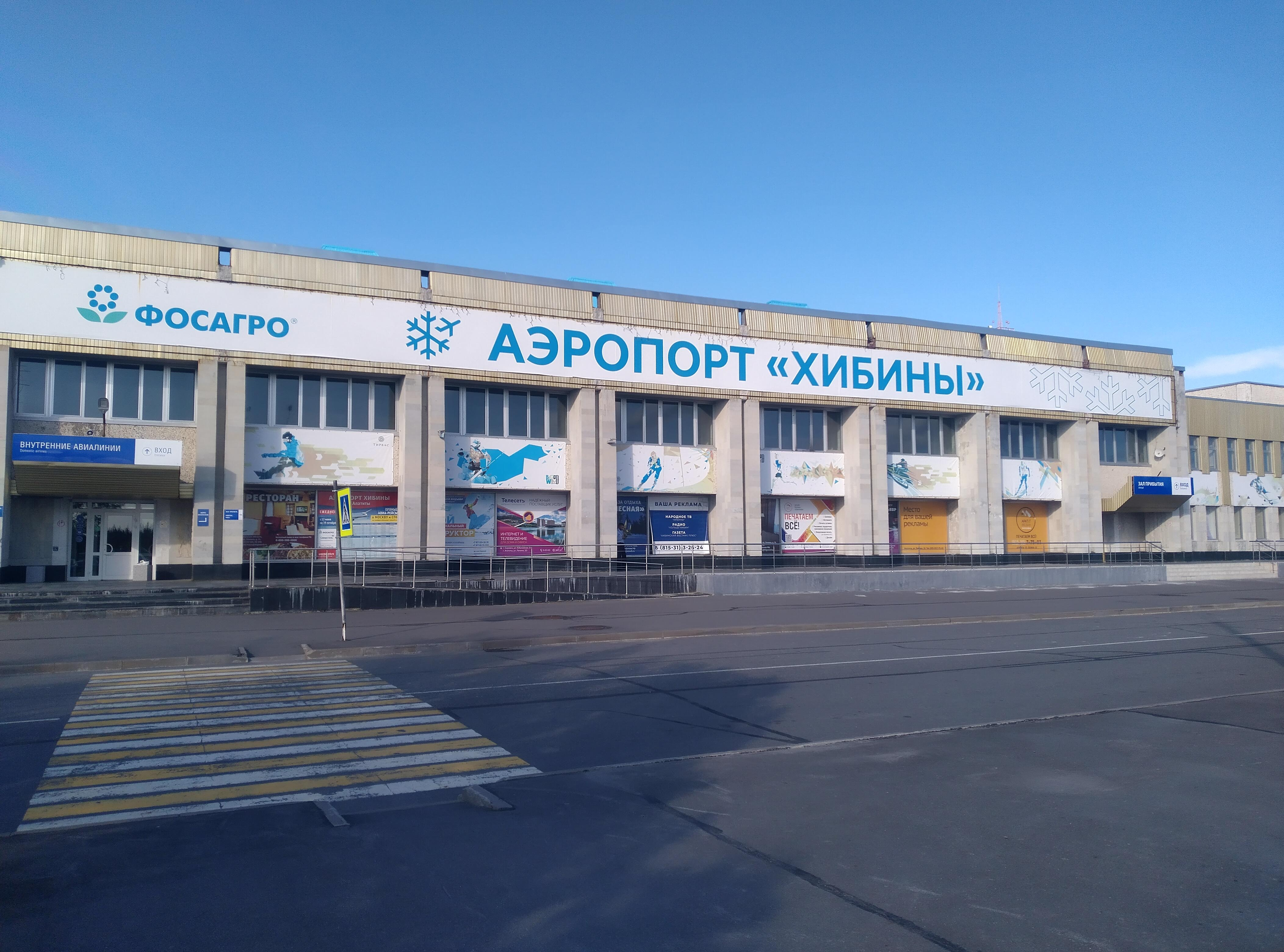
- IATA: KVK; ICAO: none

Summary
- Airport type: Civil
- Operator: JSC Aeroport "Hibiny"
- Location: Apatity, Murmansk Oblast, Russia
- Elevation AMSL: 525 ft (160 m)
- Coordinates: 67°27′47″N 33°35′17″E
- Website: hibiny.aero

Map
- Location of the airport in the Murmansk region

Runways
| Direction | Length | | Surface |
| Direction | m | ft | Surface |
|---|---|---|---|
| 12/30 | 2,500 | 8,202 | Concrete |
- Sources: GCM, STV

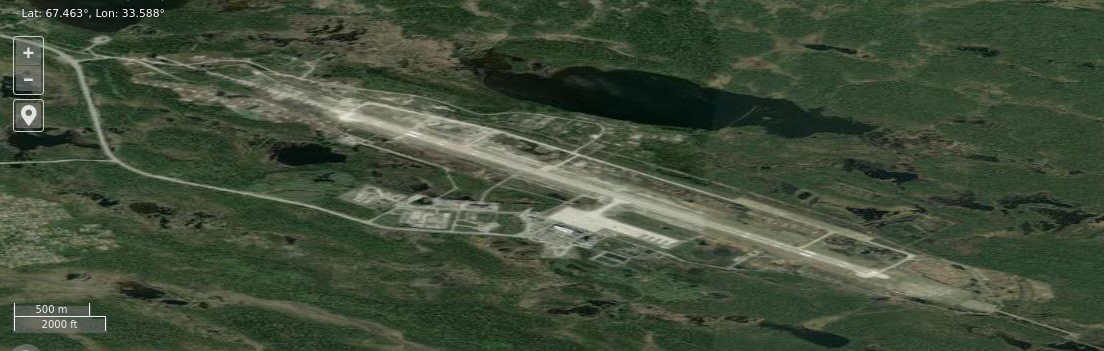
Satellite imagery of Kirovsk–Apatity Airport

Kirovsk–Apatity Airport (Russian: Аэропорт Кировск/Апатиты), also known as Khibiny Airport or Hibiny Airport (Russian: Аэропорт Хибины) (IATA: KVK) is a mixed military/civilian airport in Apatity, Murmansk Oblast, Russia. It is located 15 kilometres (9.3 mi) southeast of Apatity.

Kirovsk–Apatity Airport was officially opened in 1994, developed on a former Soviet Air Force/Russian Air Force airfield with a single tarmac area that hosted the 227th Independent Helicopter Squadron flying Mi-8 helicopters between 1992 and 2000 and the 88th Independent Helicopter Squadron between 1977 and 1994. Both were part of the Soviet Ground Forces. The airfield was revamped to serve the towns of Apatity and Kirovsk for civilian use, and in 1994 began operating flights to Sheremetyevo Airport. Currently, Kirovsk–Apatity Airport handles medium-sized airliners for domestic flights to several cities in Northwest Russia, with intentions to be developed into an international airport.

== Airlines and destinations ==
| Airlines | Destinations |
|---|---|
| Aeroflot | Moscow–Sheremetyevo |
| azimuth | Moscow-Vnukovo |
| Red Wings Airlines | Seasonal: Yekaterinburg (begins 25 December 2026) |
| Rossiya Airlines | Saint Petersburg; Seasonal: Kaliningrad |
| S7 Airlines | Seasonal: Moscow–Domodedovo |

== See also ==
- List of airports in Russia
- List of military airbases in Russia
