= Lapland Biosphere Reserve =

Strict nature reserve in Murmansk Oblast, Russia

Lapland Nature Reserve
- Russian: Лапландский заповедник (Also: Laplandskiy)
- IUCN category Ia (strict nature reserve)
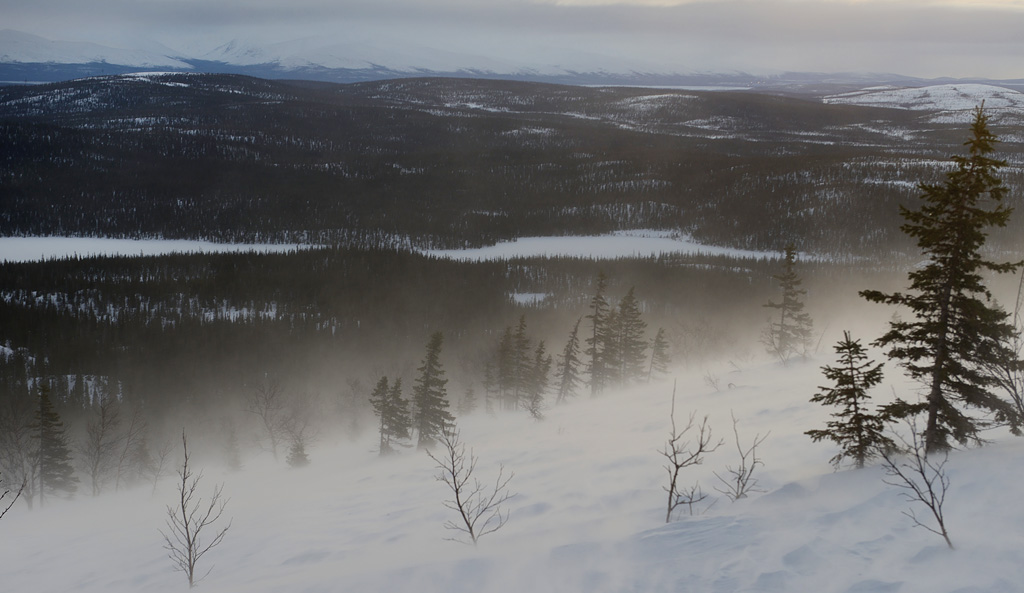
- Lapland Zapovednik

- Location within Russia
- Location: Murmansk Oblast
- Nearest city: Monchegorsk
- Coordinates: 67°49′0″N 32°28′0″E
- Area: 278,436 hectares (688,030 acres; 1,075 sq mi)
- Established: 1957
- Governing body: Ministry of Natural Resources and Environment (Russia)
- Website: http://www.laplandzap.ru/

Lapland Nature Reserve (Russian: Лапландский заповедник) (also Laplandskiy) is a Russian zapovednik (strict nature reserve) in Murmansk Oblast, Russia, above the Arctic Circle. Officially established in 1957, the reserve protects an area of 2,784 km^{2} (1,075 sq mi) to the northwest of Lake Imandra, including 86 km² of inland water. The terrain is mountainous tundra and northern taiga. Since 1985 the zapovednik has been designated by UNESCO as a biosphere reserve.

The Lapland Nature Reserve was established in 1930. However, in 1951 along with many other zapovedniks of the Soviet Union it was abolished. It was reestablished in 1957, but in 1961-1965 was merged to Kandalaksha Nature Reserve. In 1983 the 1,613 km² area of the Lapland Nature Reserve was significantly expanded to include 1,296 km² of territories to the northwest, farther from the polluting influence of the Monchegorsk nickel smelter, and the zapovednik gave away 124 km² near the city. The reserve is situated in Murmansk Oblast about 50 km south of the city of Murmansk. Its administrative center is the rural locality of Laplandsky Zapovednik.

== Topography ==
The Lapland Reserve has a terrain that is mostly mountain tundra and lakes, being situated on the western zone of the Khibiny Mountains. Most of the territory is covered by northern taiga and montane tundra with the highest point on Mount Ebruchorr (1115 m a.s.l.).

== Climate and ecoregion ==
Lapland Reserve is located in the Scandinavian and Russian taiga ecoregion, which is situated in Northern Europe between tundra in the north and temperate mixed forests in the south. It is covers parts of Norway, Sweden, Finland and the northern part of European Russia, being the largest ecoregion in Europe. The ecoregion is characterized by coniferous forests dominated by Pinus sylvestris (in drier locations), often with an understory of Juniperus communis, Picea abies and Picea obovata and a significant admixture of Betula pubescens and Betula pendula. Larix sibirica is characteristic of the eastern part of the ecoregion.

The climate of the Lapland Reserve is Humid continental climate, cool summer (Köppen climate classification (Dfc)). This climate is characterised by long cold winters, and short, cool summers.

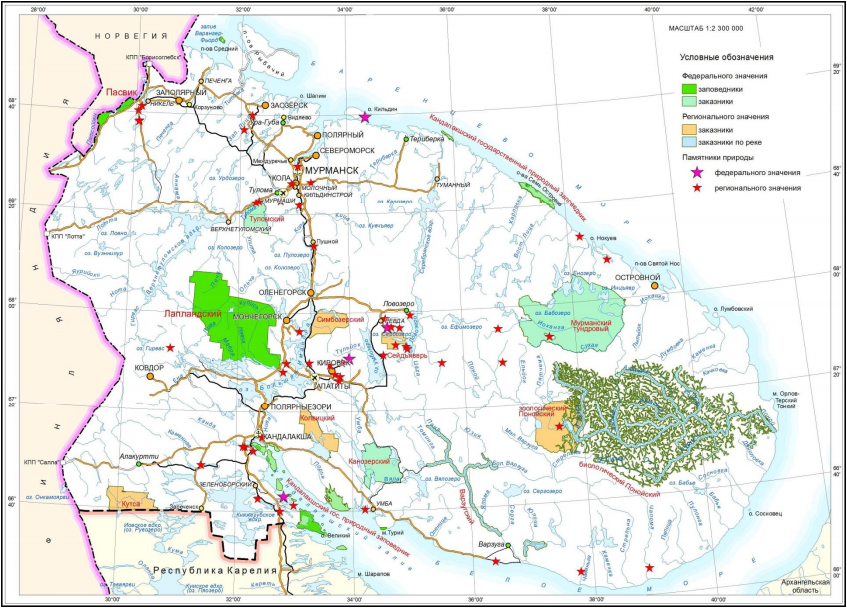
Protected areas of Murmansk Oblast. Laplandsky Reserve is the large green area in the west of the Kola Peninsula, 50 km south of Murmansk

== Ecoeducation and access ==
As a strict nature reserve, the Lapland Reserve is mostly closed to the general public, although scientists and those with 'environmental education' purposes can make arrangements with park management for visits. There are a number of 'ecotourist' routes in the reserve, however, that are open to the public. These change with the seasons and are designed to cover themes of the region - Christmas and New Year's in winter, "Spring Awakening Tour", etc. Excursions are arranged for groups through application for permits to be obtained in advance. The main office is in the city of Monchegorsk.

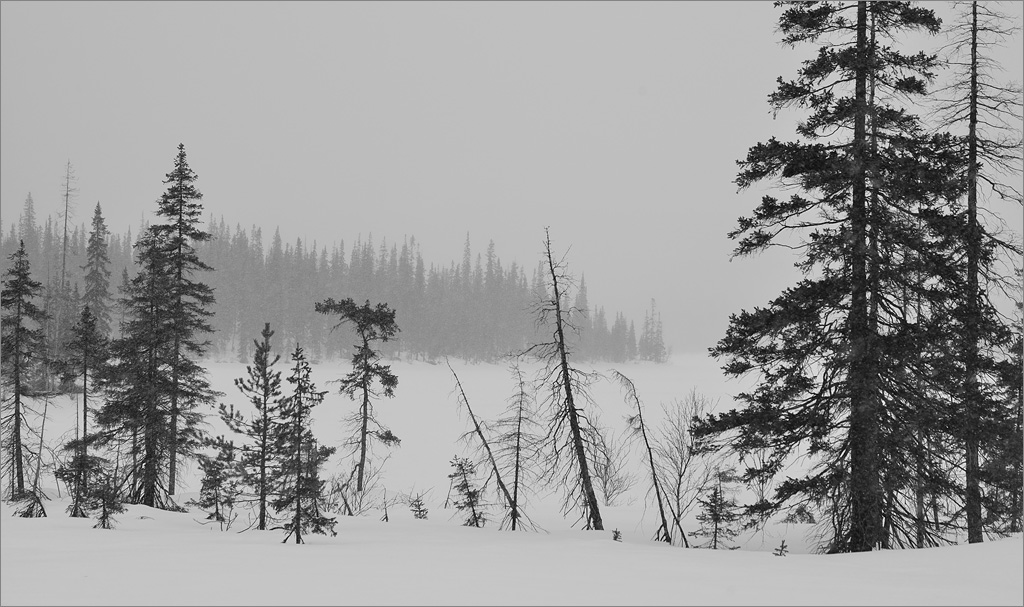

== See also ==
- Laponian area
- List of Russian Nature Reserves (class 1a 'zapovedniks')
- National Parks of Russia
