= Semenovia =

Scientific classification
- Kingdom: Plantae
- Clade: Tracheophytes
- Clade: Angiosperms
- Clade: Eudicots
- Clade: Asterids
- Order: Apiales
- Family: Apiaceae
- Subfamily: Apioideae
- Tribe: Tordylieae
- Subtribe: Tordyliinae
- Genus: Semenovia; Regel & Herder

Synonyms
- Merwiopsis Saphina; Neoplatytaenia Geld.; Platytaenia Nevski & Vved

Genus of flowering plant

Semenovia is a genus of flowering plants belonging to the family Apiaceae. It is in subfamily Apioideae and also tribe Tordylieae subtribe Tordyliinae.

Its native range is from Iran to Central Asia (within Afghanistan, Kazakhstan, Kyrgyzstan, Pakistan, Tajikistan, Tibet, Turkmenistan, Uzbekistan and the Western Himalayas) and China.

The genus name of Semenovia is in honour of Pyotr Semyonov-Tyan-Shansky (1827–1914), a Russian geographer and statistician who managed the Russian Geographical Society for more than 40 years. He gained international fame for his pioneering exploration of the Tian Shan mountains. It was first described and published in Bull. Soc. Imp. Naturalistes Moscou Vol.39 (II) on page 78 in 1866.

== Known species ==
According to Kew, about 30 known species:

- Semenovia alaica Lazkov
- Semenovia bucharica (B.Fedtsch. ex Schischk.) Manden.
- Semenovia dasycarpa (Regel & Schmalh.) Korovin ex Pimenov & V.N.Tikhom.
- Semenovia dichotoma (Boiss.) Manden.
- Semenovia dissectifolia Ukrainsk. & Kljuykov
- Semenovia eriocarpa (Bornm. & Gauba) Lyskov & Kljuykov
- Semenovia frigida (Boiss. & Hausskn.) Manden.
- Semenovia furcata Korovin
- Semenovia glabrior (C.B.Clarke) Pimenov & Kljuykov
- Semenovia gyirongensis Q.Y.Xiao & X.J.He
- Semenovia heracleifolia (H.Wolff) Hedge & Lamond
- Semenovia heterodonta (Korovin) Manden.
- Semenovia imbricata Ukrainsk. & Kljuykov
- Semenovia lasiocarpa (Boiss.) Manden.
- Semenovia macrocarpa (Rech.f. & Riedl) Alava
- Semenovia malcolmii (Hemsl. & H.Pearson) Pimenov
- Semenovia pamirica (Lipsky) Manden.
- Semenovia pimpinellioides (Nevski) Manden.
- Semenovia propinqua (Aitch. & Hemsl.) Manden.
- Semenovia pulvinata Pimenov & Kljuykov
- Semenovia radiata (Rech.f. & Riedl) Alava
- Semenovia rubtzovii (Schischk.) Manden.
- Semenovia subscaposa (Rech.f.) Alava
- Semenovia suffruticosa (Freyn & Bornm.) Manden.
- Semenovia thomsonii (C.B.Clarke) Manden.
- Semenovia tragioides (Boiss.) Manden.
- Semenovia transiliensis Regel & Herder
- Semenovia vachanica Ukrainsk. & Kljuykov
- Semenovia vaginata Pimenov
- Semenovia zaprjagaevii Korovin
