= Laplandsky Zapovednik =

Laplandsky Zapovednik Лапландский заповедник
- Inhabited locality
- Interactive map of Laplandsky Zapovednik
- Location of Laplandsky Zapovednik Laplandsky Zapovednik (Murmansk Oblast)
- Coordinates: 67°39′05″N 32°38′51″E
- Country: Russia
- Federal subject: Murmansk Oblast
- Elevation: 138 m (453 ft)

Population (2010 Census)
  - Total: 0
  - Estimate (2010): 0 )

Administrative status
  - Subordinated to: Monchegorsk Town with Jurisdictional Territory

Municipal status
  - Urban okrug: Monchegorsk Urban Okrug
- Time zone: UTC+3 (MSK)
- Postal code: 184512
- Dialing code: +7 81536
- OKTMO ID: 47715000106

Laplandsky Zapovednik (Russian: Лапландский заповедник) is a rural locality (an inhabited locality) in jurisdiction of Monchegorsk Town with Jurisdictional Territory in Murmansk Oblast, Russia, located beyond the Arctic Circle at a height of 178 meters (584 ft) above sea level. Population: 0 (2010 Census).
