= Niva (river) =

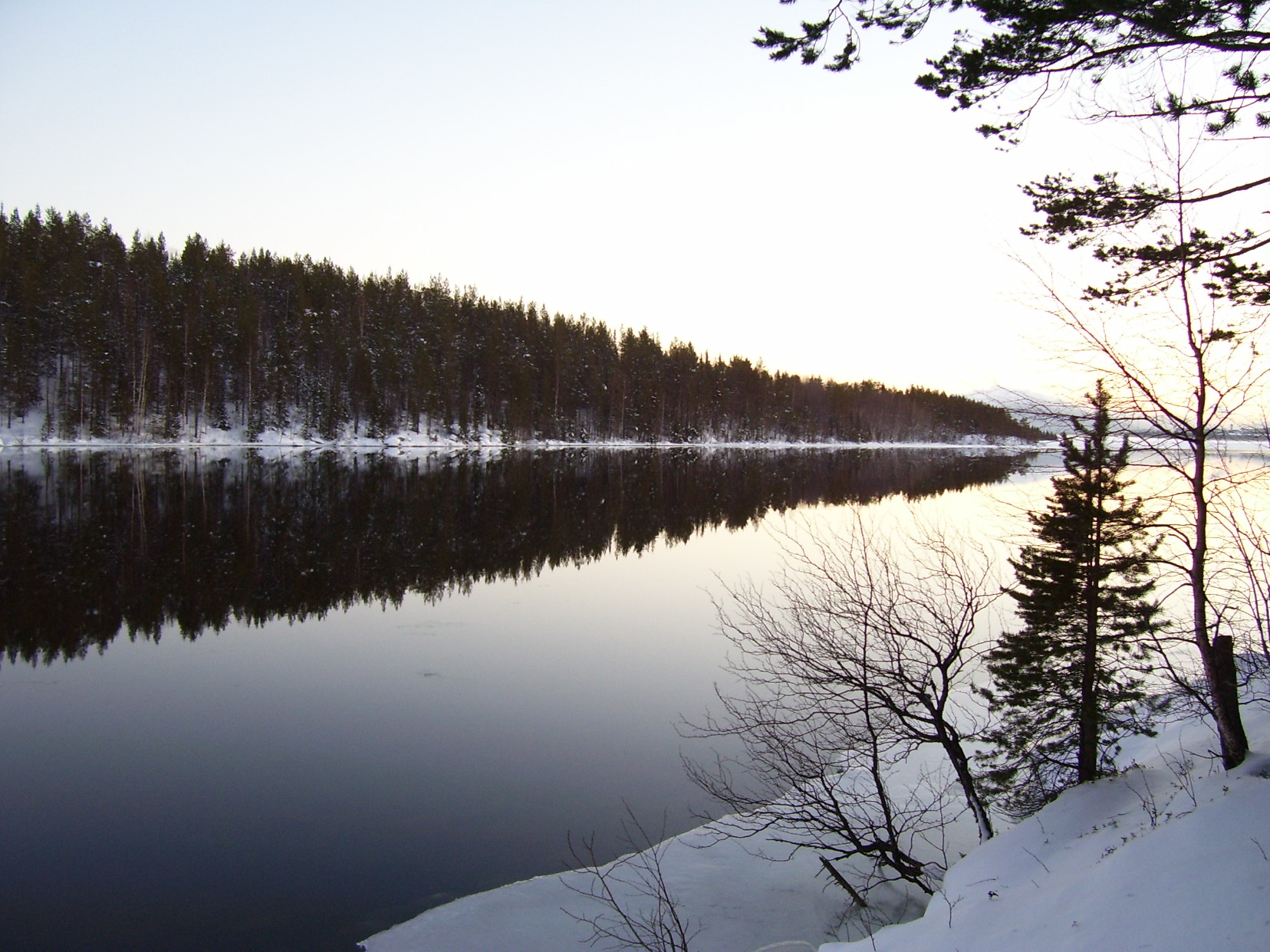

Location
- Country: Russia

Physical characteristics
- Source: Lake Imandra
- Mouth: White Sea
  - coordinates: 67.1317°N 32.4229°E
- Length: 36 km (22 mi)
- Basin size: 12,830 km^{2} (4,950 sq mi)

The Niva (Russian: Нива) is a river in the Murmansk Oblast in Russia. It is 36 kilometres (22 mi) long, and has a drainage basin of 12,830 square kilometres (4,950 sq mi). The Niva flows out of the Lake Imandra and into the Kandalaksha Gulf of the White Sea. The town of Kandalaksha is located in the estuary of the Niva.

Its maximum depth is 24 feet (7.3 m).

Between 1936 and 1954 three hydroelectric power stations were built on the Niva. Total capacity is 240 MW and annual power production 1390 GWh.
