= Lake Imandra =

Lake in Murmansk, Russia

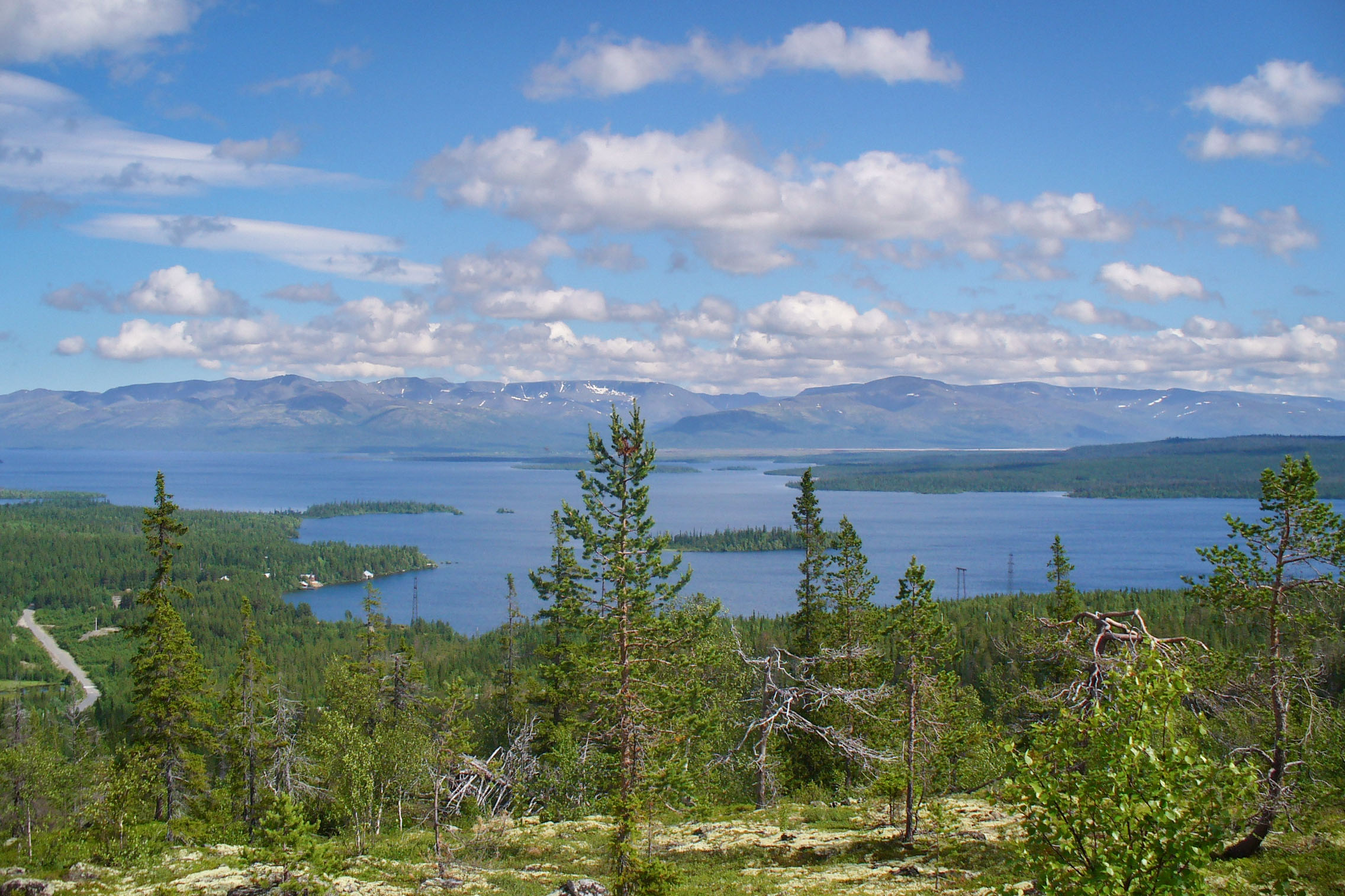

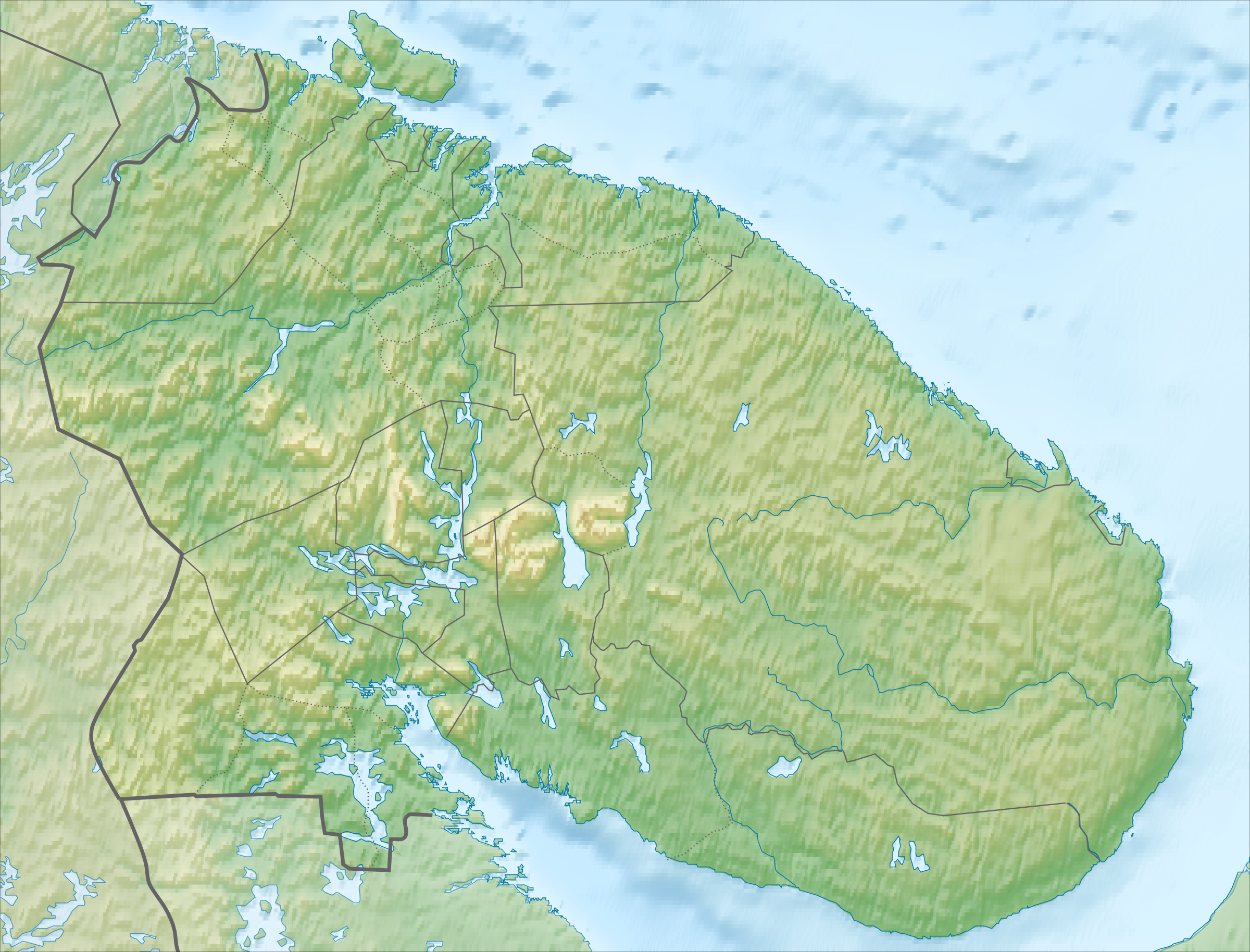
- Location within Murmansk Oblast Location within Russia
- Location: Kola Peninsula, Murmansk Oblast
- Coordinates: 67°40′N 33°00′E
- Primary outflows: Niva River
- Basin countries: Russia
- Surface area: 876 km^{2} (338 sq mi)
- Max. depth: 67 m (220 ft)
- Surface elevation: 127 m (417 ft)
- Frozen: Winter
- Islands: Erm Island

Imandra (Skolt Sami: Âʹvverjäuʹrr, Russian: Имандра, Finnish: Imantero) is a lake in the south-western part of the Kola Peninsula in Murmansk Oblast, Russia, slightly beyond the Arctic Circle. It is located 127 m above sea level; its area is about 876 km^{2}, maximum depth is 67 m. The shape of the shore line is complicated. There are a number of islands and the largest, Erm Island, measures 26 km^{2}. There are three principal parts of the lake connected by narrow straits: Greater Imandra (Большая Имандра) or Khibinskaya Imandra in the north (area 328 km^{2}, length about 55 km, width 3–5 km), Ekostrovskaya Imandra in the centre (area 351 km^{2}), and Babinskaya Imandra in the west (area 133 km^{2}). The lake drains into the Kandalaksha Gulf of the White Sea by the Niva River. The lake is known for the transparency of its water and its abundance of fish.

== Towns on or near the lake ==
The town of Monchegorsk, located on the Monche-Guba inlet in the north-western part of the lake, is known as a centre of winter sports. During the summer, many residents enjoy boating on the lake, while in winter the frozen lake is popular with cross-country skiers.

Apatity is located near the eastern shore of the lake, and Polyarnye Zori are on the Niva River a few kilometers below its outflow from the lake.

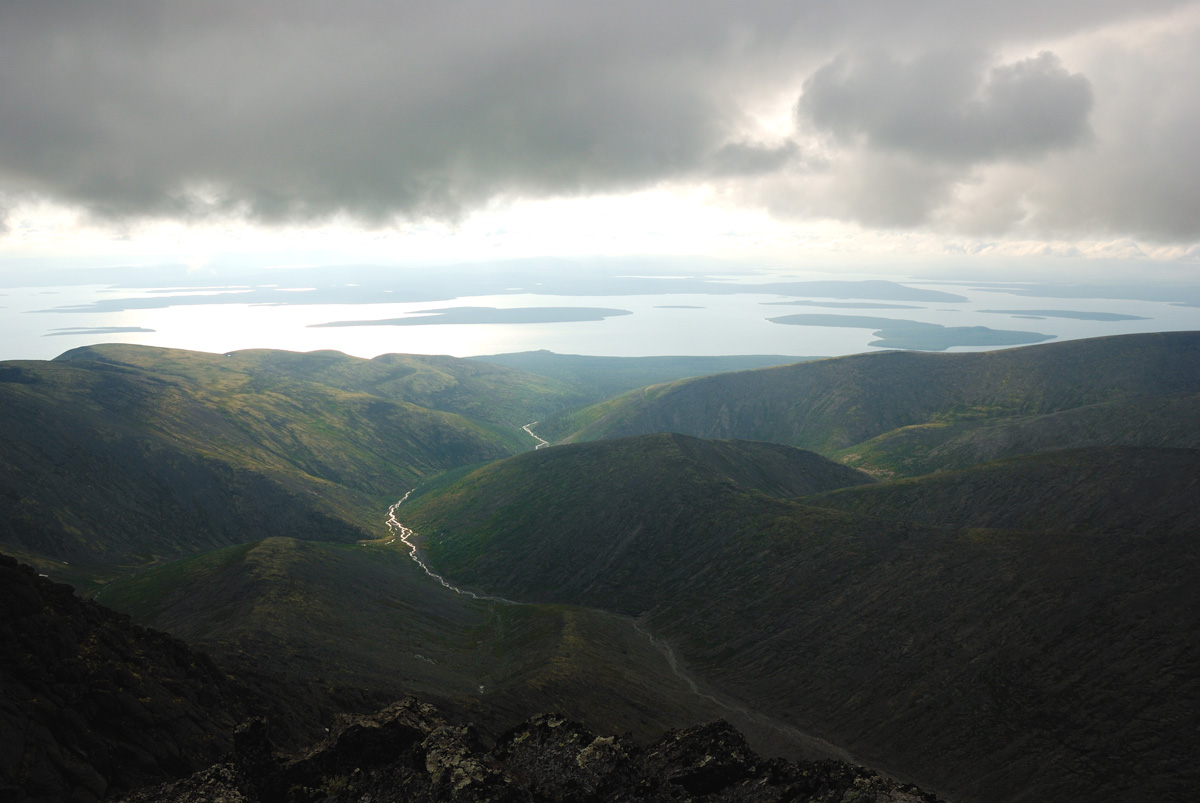
View on lake Imandra from the Khibiny Mountains

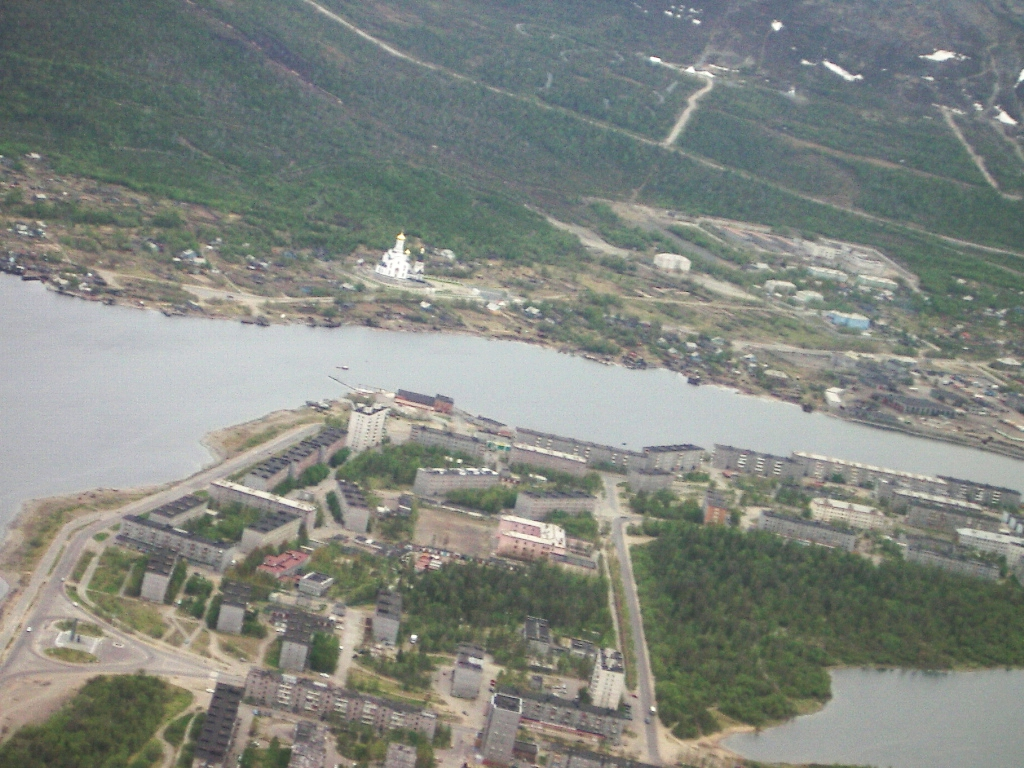
A section of the Monche Guba in Monchegorsk (running across the photo from right to left)

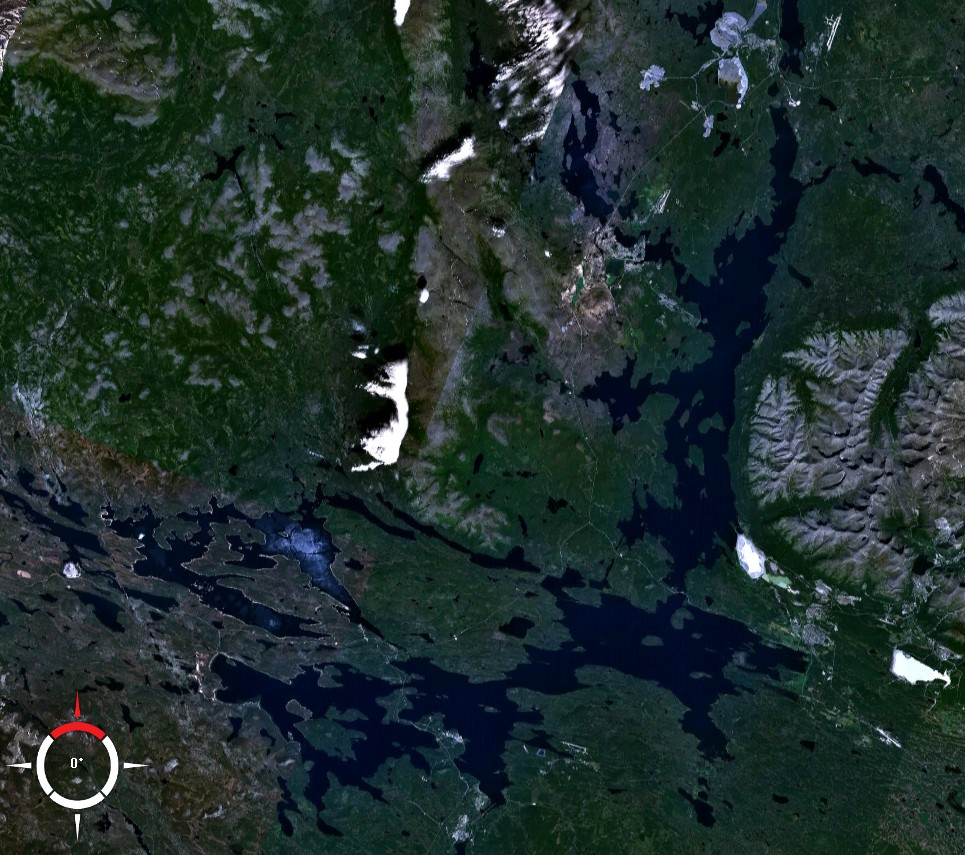
Satellite image

== Navigation ==
Presently, Lake Imandra is only used by local residents for recreational boating.

However, for several years in the 1930s, before the railway branch between Monchegorsk and the Leningrad-Murmansk mainline was built, Monchegorsk was connected to the rest of the country in summer by boat across Lake Imandra. Ferries from Monchegorsk would dock in Tik-Guba (today's Apatity), on the main rail line.
