= Bolshoy Oleny Island =

Island in Murmansk oblast, Russia

Coordinates: 69.2239°N 33.48284°E

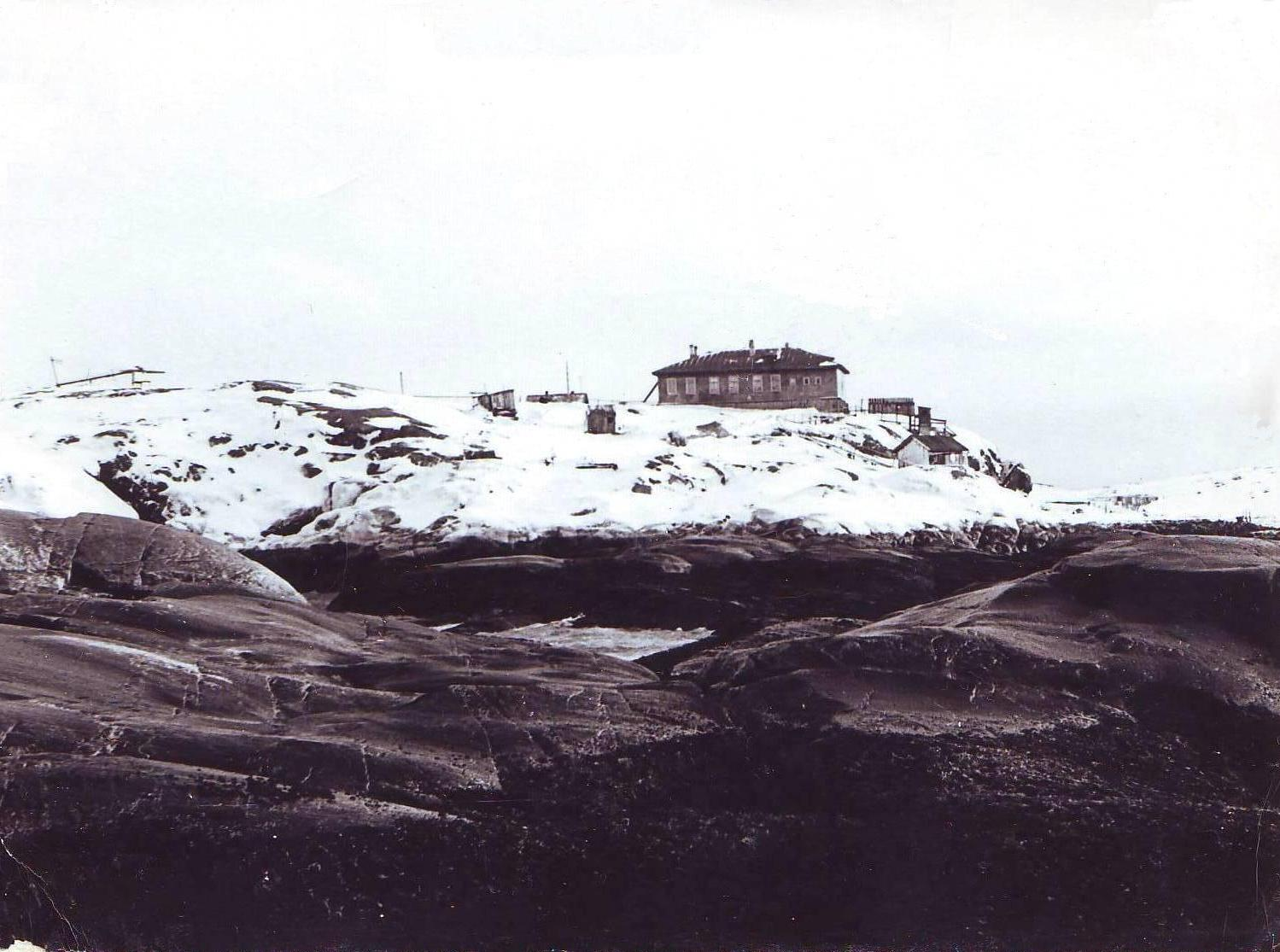
View of Bolshoy Oleny Island from the Gulf (1974)

Bolshoy Oleny Island (Russian: Большой Олений остров lit. 'Great Reindeer Island)') is an island in the Kola district of the Murmansk region of Russia. It is located in the Kola Bay of the Barents Sea, 2.5 km northeast of the city of Polyarny, and 35 km north of Murmansk.

There is an important archaeological site on the island. Settlers arrived to this area about 3,500 years ago, or earlier.

== Area status ==
The island is a protected area, which is under the protection of the Murmansk biological station.

In 1910 a lighthouse was built on the island.

In 1950-2006, there was a town here that was called Mayak Bolshoi Oleny.

== Archaeology ==
In 1925, the Olenostrovsky burial ground of the early metal era was discovered here, which was excavated in 1928 by A.V. Schmidt, and in 1947-1948 by N.N. Gurina.

Excavations uncovered 23 burials in shallow pits; among them were the burials in wooden boxes, as well as those using tarred leather wrappings. There are two instances of cremation. The inventory includes tools made of stone and bone, such as arrowheads, daggers, awls, needles, and fish hooks. A copper arrowhead, and a sculpture of the head of an elk were found. 5 fragments of "wafer" ceramics were also found.

== Dating ==
Earlier it was thought that the Olenostrovsky site belonged to the middle of the I millennium BC. But new radiocarbon dates were obtained for two graves on the island. The new dates are centred around 1500–1400 BC. The organic preservation is very good.

== Recent exploration ==
In 2001, four additional clusters of human bones and artefacts were discovered in the eastern part of the burial ground. Also, 59 fragments of Asbestos-ceramic were collected, showing broad analogies in the territory of Karelia and the Kola Peninsula (where this type of ceramics is usually dated to the second half of the 3rd millennium BC).

Asbestos-ceramics of the early 'Lovozero Ware' type were found on the Island.

Furthermore, a later type of the asbestos tempered ware was also found, known in the Russian archaeological literature as 'waffe' ware. In Norwegian and Finnish literature, similar impressions on pottery are usually called 'textile' or 'imitated textile'.

Particularly noteworthy is the discovery of fragments of a ladle for pouring molten metal.

The presence of different types of dishes has implications both regarding the duration of the operation of the cemetery, and its use by different cultural groups of the population.

A ship burial was found in 2003. Skulls from this burial are related to the culture of 'sea hunters' (dating 3200 BP), and have a specific 'Urals anthropological type'. Among the modern populations, they are closest to the Ural groups and completely different from the Saami.

== Paleogenetics ==
Mitochondrial haplogroups C*, C5, U5a, U5a1, U4a1, Z1a, D* and T* were identified in fossil remains of the population. According to scientists, the greatest genetic similarity with samples from the Island was shown by modern Siberian populations, mainly in the Yenisei River basin. Presumably, the population of the Island arrived to the Kola Peninsula 3,500 years ago from Central Siberia, but then the traces of this migration faded away, thus not being reflected in the gene pool of modern populations of the Kola Peninsula.

== See also ==
- Kola Peninsula

== Literature ==
- Khartanovich V.I., Moiseev V.G., Report to the International Scientific Conference "Archeology of the Arctic" November 19–23, 2017 Salekhard
- Khartanovich V.I., Moiseev V.G. Anthropological composition of the ancient population of the Kola peninsula (on craniological materials from the Early Metal Age burial site on the Bolshoy Oleny Ostrov in the Barents Sea)// The Mesolithic and the Neolithic in eastern Europe: chronology and cultural contacts. – St. Petersburg, 2016. – PP. 128–145
- Murashkin, A.I., Kolpakov, E.M., Shumkin, V.Ya., Khartanovich, V.I. & Moiseyev, V.G. Kola Oleneostrovskiy Grave Field: a unique burial site in the European Arctic // «New Sites, New Methods». The Finnish Antiquarian Society. Iskos 21. – Helsinki: 2016. – PP. 187–199.
- Old area map (1930)
- Клюге Г. А. Письмо в Главнауку о заповедании Большого Оленьего острова. 1928 г. /. // Гос. архив Мурманской области. Фонд 20, опись 1, дело 53, лист 16.
- Погребальные традиции и ритуалы древнего населения Русской Лапландии
