= Lake Kildinskoye =

Lake in Murmansk Oblast, Russia

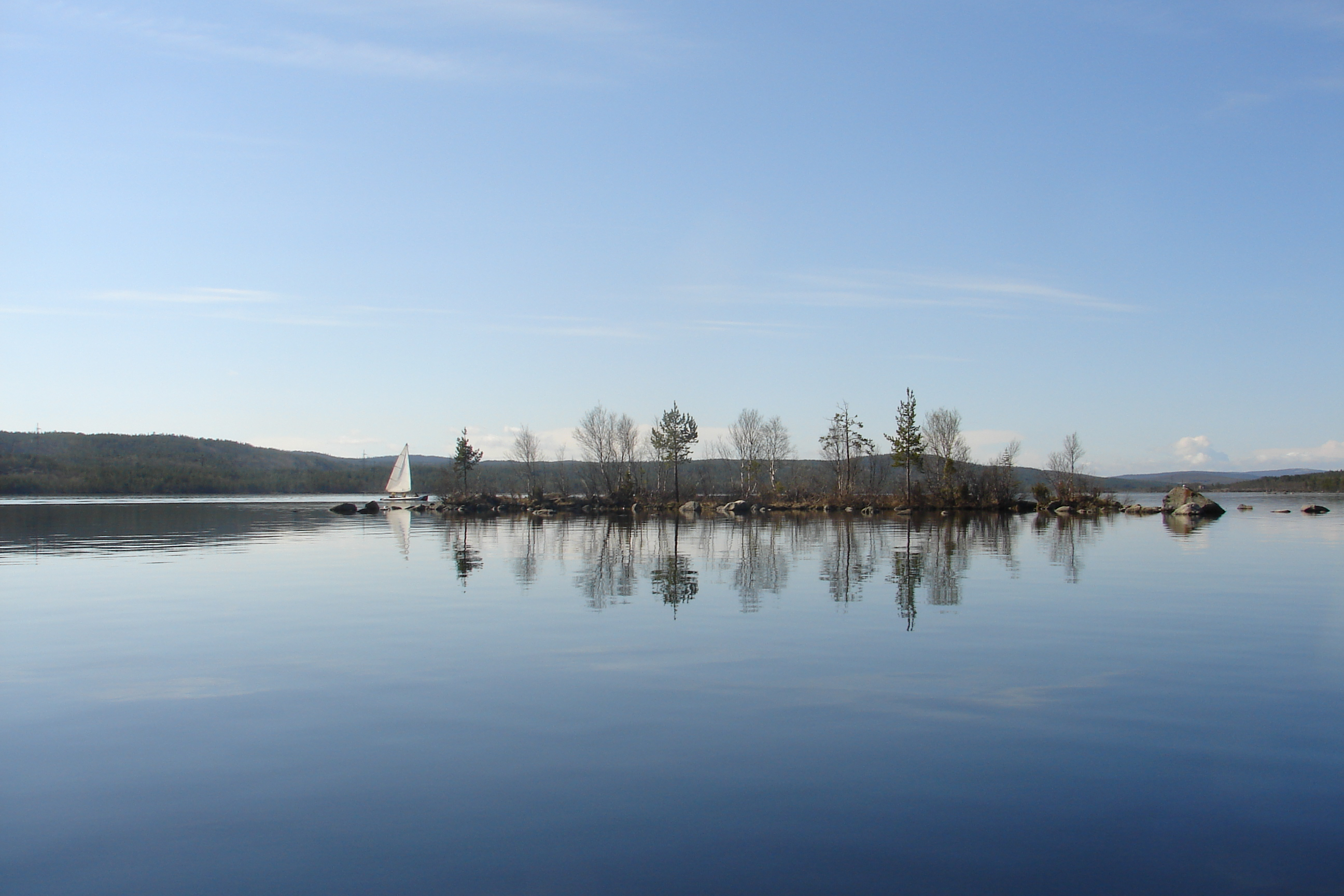
- An island in Lake Kildinskoye

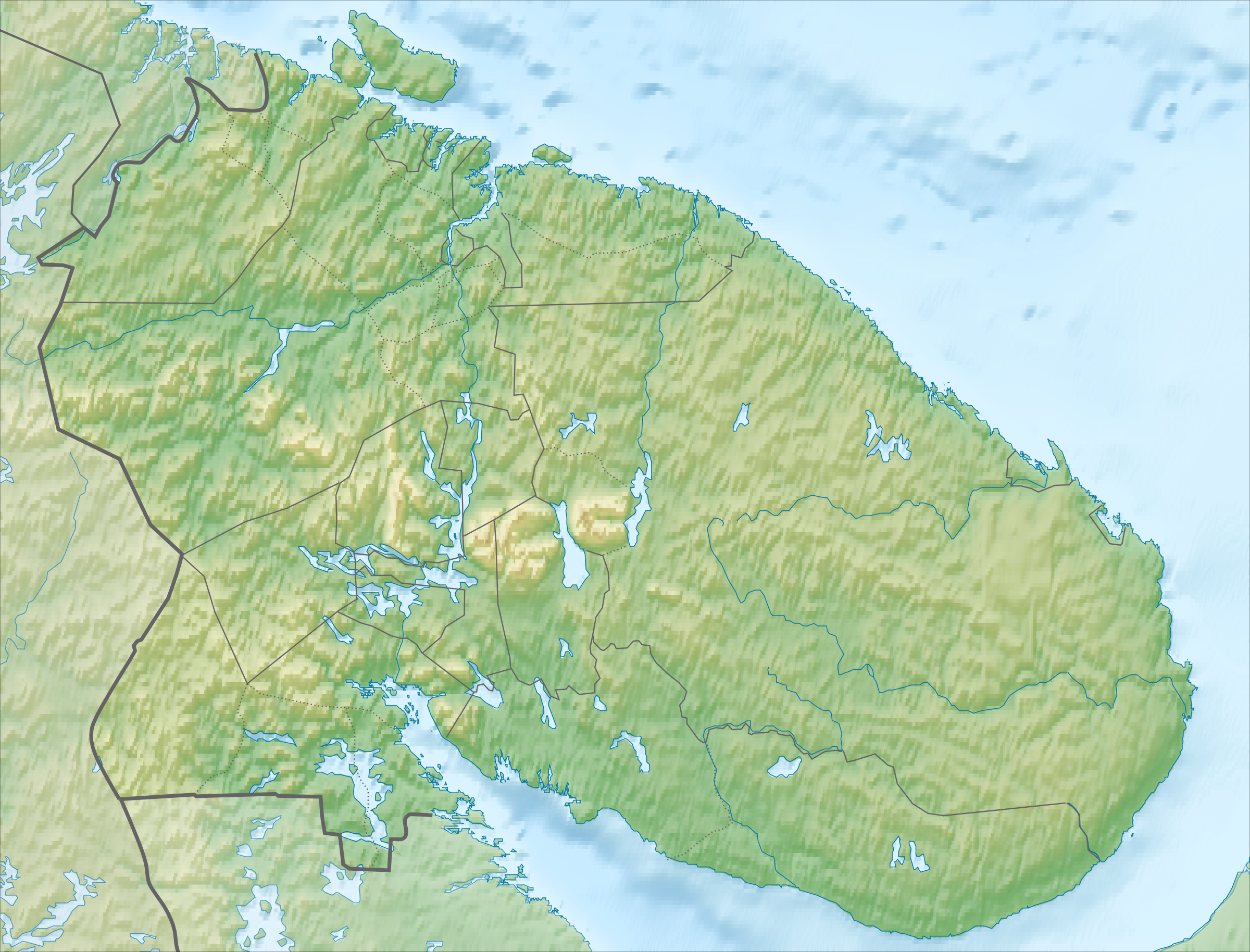
- Location within Murmansk Oblast Location within Russia
- Location: Kolsky District, Murmansk Oblast, Russia
- Coordinates: 68°50′N 33°13′E
- Basin countries: Russia
- Max. length: 8 km (5.0 mi)
- Max. width: 1 km (0.62 mi)
- Surface elevation: 71 m (233 ft)

Lake Kildinskoye (Russian: Кильдинское озеро) is a lake in Kolsky District, Murmansk Oblast, Russia. It is located in the east of the Kola Peninsula close to the confluence of the Tuloma River and Kola River, 13 kilometers (8.1 mi) south-east of the city of Murmansk. The lake is approximately 8 kilometers (5.0 mi) long and 1 kilometer (0.62 mi) wide. Lake Kildinskoye's proximity to Murmansk, European route E105, and Severomorsk-3 air base has made it a popular year-round tourism location used for various recreational purposes, including sailing regattas during the summer and wind surfing during the winter. Activities related to the Festival of the North, an annual winter sports festival held across Murmansk Oblast since 1934, are held on and round the lake when it is frozen over.

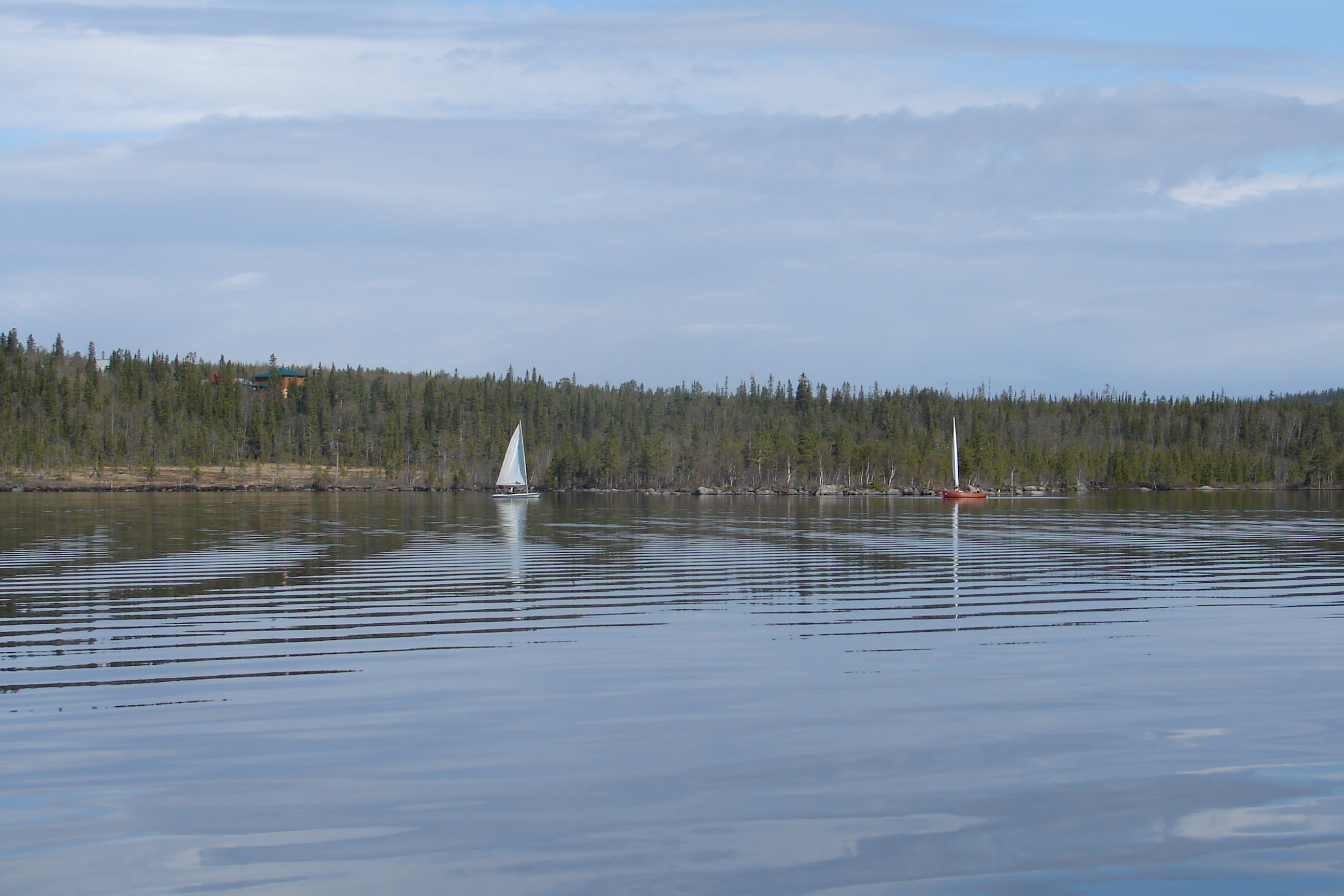
Lake Kildinskoye.
