= Voronya =

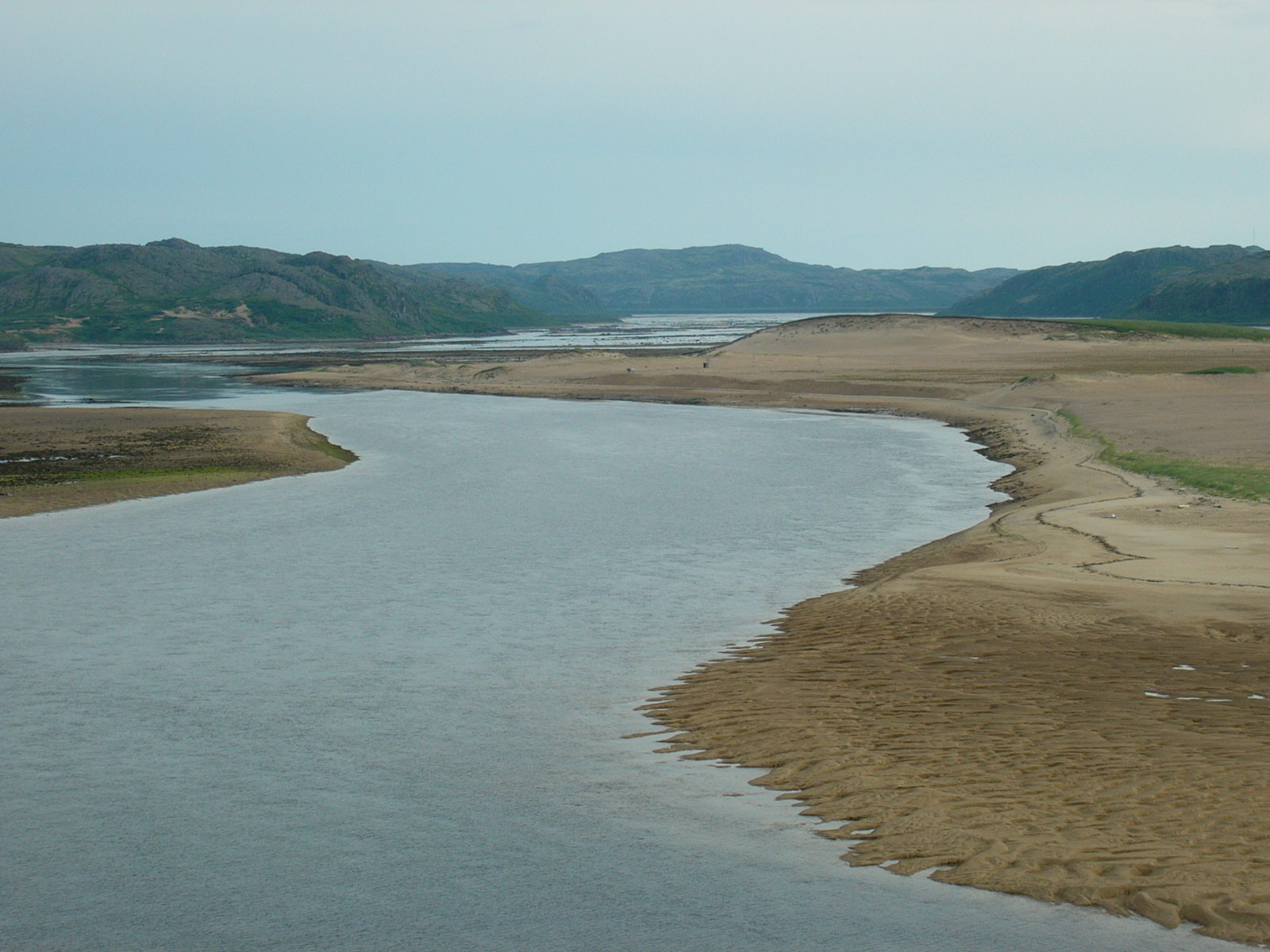

Location
- Country: Russia

Physical characteristics
- Mouth: Barents Sea
  - coordinates: 69°10′57″N 35°47′57″E
- Length: 137 km (85 mi)
- Basin size: 1,600 km^{2} (620 sq mi)

The Voronya (Russian: Воро́нья) is a river on the Kola Peninsula in Murmansk Oblast, Russia. It is 155 km in length. The area of its drainage basin is 9,940 km². The Voronya flows out of Lake Lovozero and into the Barents Sea.

There are two hydroelectric power stations on the river, with a total capacity of 351 MW and an annual production of 1069 GWh.
