= Kola Bay Bridge =

Bridge in Murmansk, Russia

Coordinates: 68°54′23″N 33°02′29″E

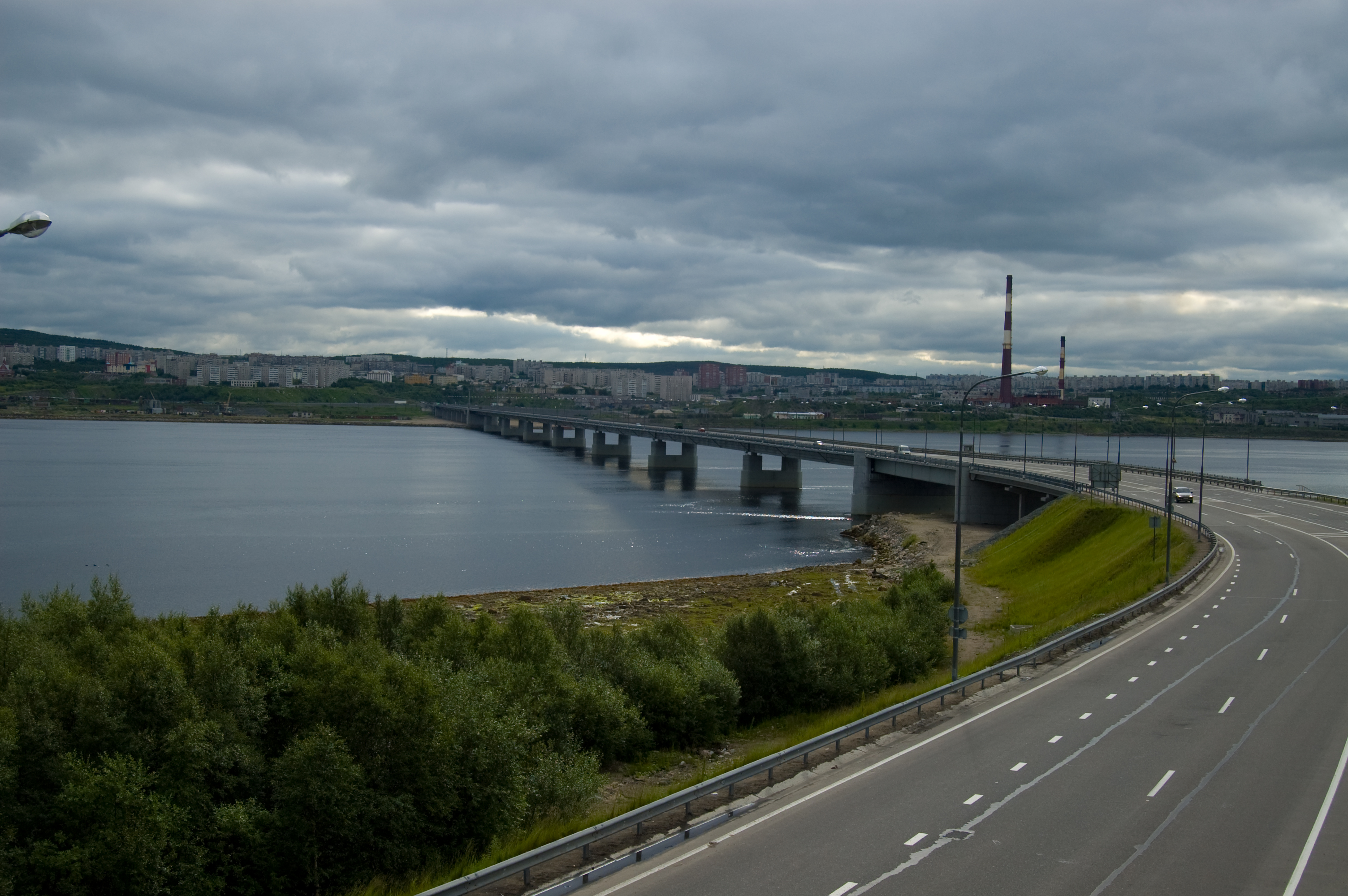
Kola Bay Bridge

Kola Bay Bridge (Russian: Мост через Кольский залив; Kola Bridge, Kolsky Bridge - Russian: Кольский мост) across the Kola Bay in Murmansk, Russia is the world's longest automobile bridge north of the Polar Circle (the railway Yuribey Bridge, also in Russia, is the only longer bridge in the Arctic). With a length of 1.6 kilometers, and 2.5 kilometers if the high-way is taken into account, it is the 9th longest bridge in Russia as of 2010. The first stage was constructed in 1992-2004 and opened on 11 October 2005. The construction of the second stage proceeds.
