= Lake Semyonovskoye =

Lake in Murmansk Oblast, Russia

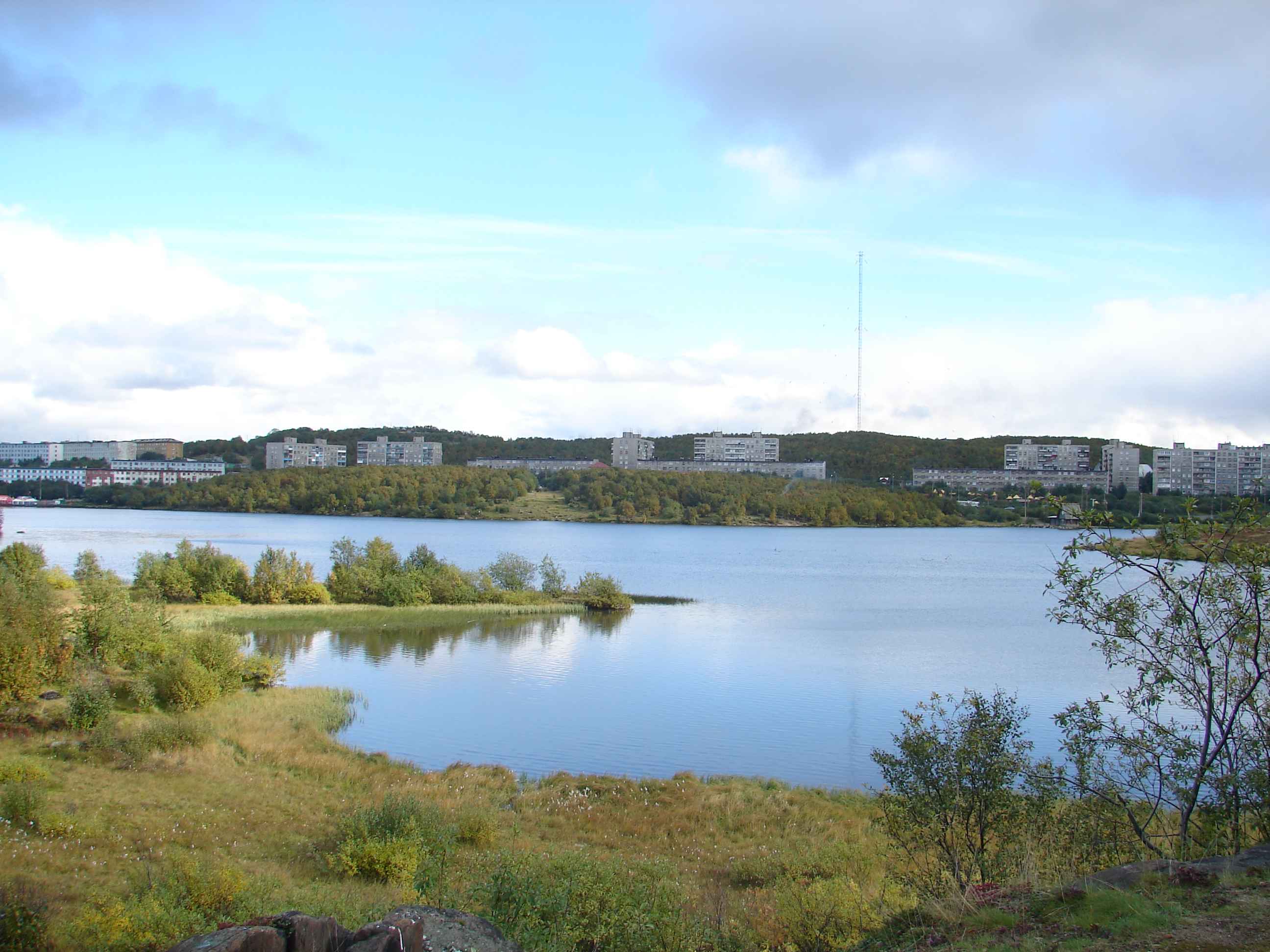

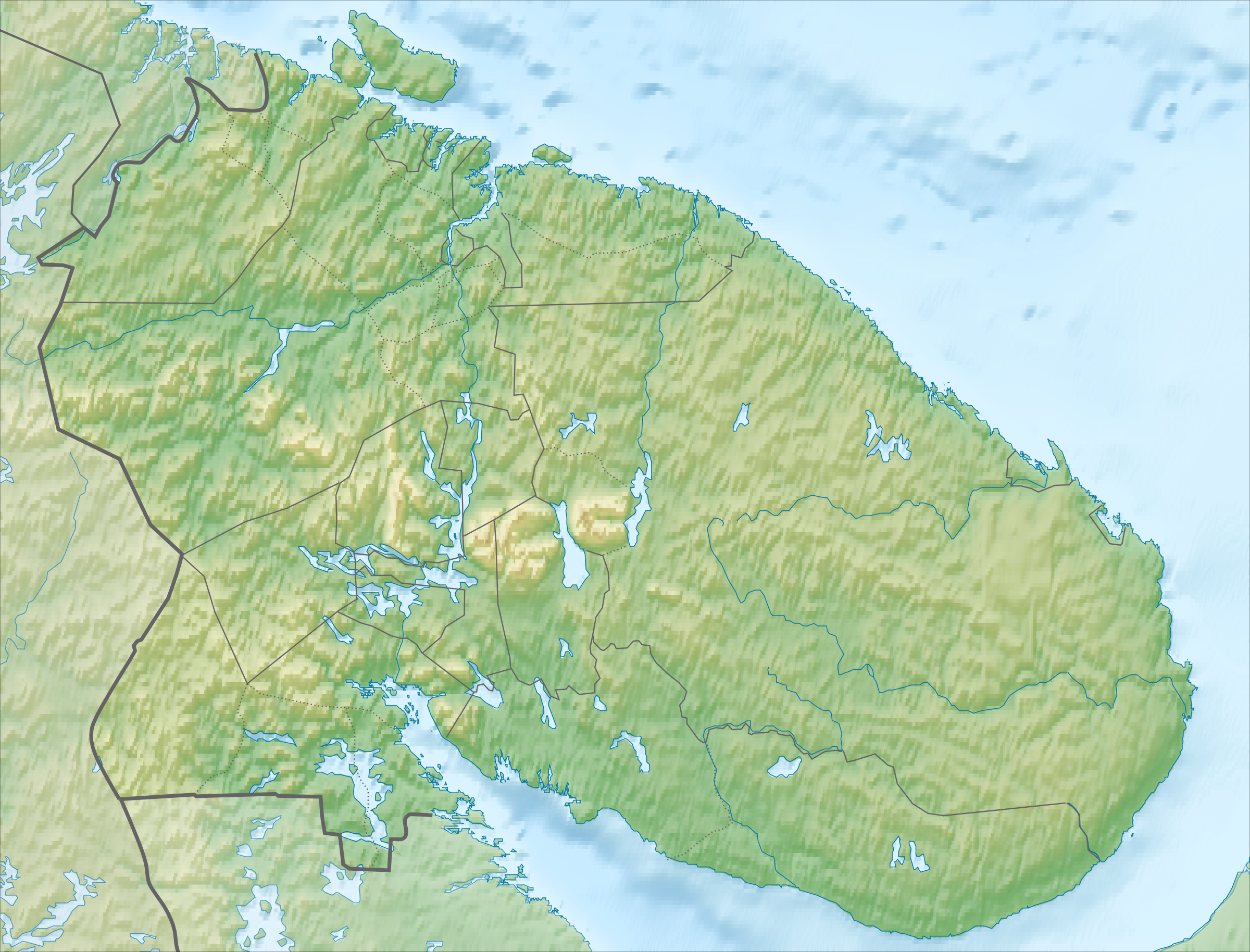
- Location within Murmansk Oblast Location within Russia
- Location: Murmansk Oblast
- Coordinates: 68°59′29″N 33°05′10″E
- Primary outflows: Semyonovsky Stream
- Basin countries: Russia
- Max. length: 0.78 km (0.48 mi)
- Max. width: 0.58 km (0.36 mi)
- Surface area: 0.195 km^{2} (0.075 sq mi)
- Average depth: 18 m (59 ft)
- Surface elevation: 98 m (322 ft)

Lake Semyonovskoye (Russian: Семёновское озеро) is a freshwater lake on the Kola Peninsula, Murmansk Oblast, Russia in Murmansk. It has an area of 0.195 km². Semyonovsky Stream flows from the lake.
