= Kolo Volost =

Territorial division of the Novgorod Republic

Kolo Volost (Russian: волость Коло) was a territorial division (a volost) of the Novgorod Republic.

It was first mentioned in the 13th century. The last documentary mention of the volost was in the 15th century.

Kolo Volost bordered Tre Volost approximately along the line between Kildin Island and Turiy Headland of the Turiy Peninsula. Kolo Volost was situated to the west of that line, while Tre Volost laid to the west of it.
