= Asbestos-ceramic =

Ancient Fennoscandian type of pottery

Asbestos-ceramic is a type of pottery manufactured with asbestos and clay in Finland, Karelia and more widely in Fennoscandia from around 5000 BC. Some remnants of this style of pottery lasted until as late as 200 AD. These ceramics are able to retain heat longer than other pottery.

Occasionally other kinds of pottery that do not contain any asbestos, but do have good insulating properties, are (mistakenly) called "asbestos-ceramic". However, some such pottery, called hair-thermal pottery, is found with similar shape and decoration, dating from the same period as some of the genuine asbestos-containing ceramics, and is discussed below.

== Origin and distribution ==
Around 3600 BC, when typical comb ware ceramics were replaced by late comb ware ceramics, the practice of mixing asbestos into pottery clay emerged in eastern Finland and the Karelian regions near Lake Ladoga, and also along the Neva River.

The most probable origin of this style of ware is the shores of Lake Saimaa in Finland. Finds from inland Finland are the oldest, and the Lake Saimaa area is the only location in the region with plentiful, nearby, easily accessible natural deposits of asbestos. In Finland, finds of asbestos-containing ceramics are known from c. 3900–2800 BCE to c. 1800–1500 BC. In northern Scandinavia, asbestos ware appears apparently from c. 1500 BC to c. 500 BC. (Note: The analysis made by University of Lund, Department of Quaternary Geology, on asbestos pottery was quite unexpected, since this part of Northern Europe, usually considered to be a step behind the rest of Europe, actually introduced iron production in the pre-Roman Iron Age.)

Some scholars argue that these pottery traditions were influenced from the Upper Volga and the Oka regions.

Asbestos-ceramic of Lovozero ware type is also found in Fennoscandia, on Bolshoy Oleny Island in the Murmansk region of Russia. Furthermore, a later type of asbestos-laden ware was also found here, known in the Russian archaeological literature as waffe ware. In Norwegian and Finnish literature, the usual term for similar impressions on pottery is 'textile' or 'imitated textile'.

== Categories of asbestos ceramics ==
Asbestos ceramics are usually classified as a sub-type of comb ceramic ware.

From the times of the earliest comb ware (c. 5000 BC) in Finland, asbestos was mixed with clay as an adhesive. At some point, people started to make use of the characteristics of asbestos: Its long fibres allowed large vessels with thin walls, which made them lighter, without compromising durability. Some of the vessels had walls 6 mm thick with a diameter of around 50 cm (Pöljä-style).

The Finnish researchers divide asbestos ceramics into the following styles:

Early asbestos ware

- Pit-comb ware with asbestos
- Kaunissaari ware
- Sperrings ware

Main-period styles

- Pöljä ware
- Kierikki ware

Late asbestos ware

- Jysmä ware

Kaunissaari ware (c. 4300 – c. 3800 cal BC) was an early asbestos-tempered ware. Its distribution is centred on the eastern lake area of Finland. Sperrings ware was another type of early asbestos-tempered ware from about the same time.

The style seems to disappear around 200 AD in Finland but continues in Scandinavia. The disappearance is thought to be related to the transition to a semi-nomadic reindeer husbandry lifestyle.

=== Asbestos-containing variants ===
There are two variants of asbestos-containing pottery. The name depends on the proportion of asbestos: Ceramics with an asbestos amount of 50–60% are called asbestos pottery; vessels containing 90% asbestos and 10% clay are asbestos ware.

==== Asbestos pottery ====
Asbestos pottery (50–60% asbestos, 50–40% clay) is usually found along with evidence suggesting metal work, i.e. crucibles, moulds, slag, fused clay, artefacts of bronze and copper, and stone sledge hammers. Asbestos ceramic may also have been used as a heat-storage medium. (Note: There are a few finds of pure copper artifacts among asbestos ceramic finds. These include a bracelet and a hatchet (Finland) and some pieces of copper (Sweden).)

Some of the Fennoscandian vessel patterns are identical to the Neolithic and Bronze Age Jōmon culture in Japan (jōmon meaning 'rope pattern'). However, the most common patterns are the comb and pit decorations typical of North-Eastern Europe at the time (Finland).

==== Asbestos ware ====
Asbestos ware (90% asbestos, 10% clay) is unusually heat-tolerant: It can survive temperatures up to 900–1000 °C.

It is believed that asbestos ware was also used in iron production such as spearheads, arrowheads and artefacts. Found vessels were drilled with many holes. The fact that the reduction of iron ore (FeO_{3}) with abundant carbon generates large amounts of carbon monoxide (CO) may suggest that the drilled holes were used to improve the availability of air (oxygen) to maintain an adequately intense flame for the high temperatures required for the iron smelting. Iron ore is abundant in lakes e.g. in Finland.

=== Clay with hair added ===
Lastly, the term hair-temperature pottery refers to ceramics made of fine, sorted clay, augmented with about 30% finely cut hair and chamotte. It generally contains no asbestos (some samples have insignificant traces). These ceramics were made with similar shape, size, and surface treatment (including decoration) as the asbestos pottery.

Hair, when used as ceramic additive, burns away at the time of firing, leaving characteristic thin pores in the resulting pottery. The hair-thermal ceramics' intended use is unknown, but tests of its heat-retaining (insulating) capacity suggests it was intended for some kind of use requiring insulation. However, unlike asbestos, mixing hair into clay does not improve the durability or heat resistance of the resulting ceramic.

== Sources ==
- Hulthén, Birgitta (1993). On Ceramic ware in Northern Scandinavia during the Neolithic, Bronze and Early Iron Age.
