= Tre Volost =

Territorial division of the Novgorod Republic

Tre Volost (Russian: волость Тре) was a territorial division (a volost) of the Novgorod Republic.

It was first mentioned in a 1265 treaty of Yaroslav Yaroslavich with Novgorod, and was later also mentioned in other documents dated as late as 1471.

Tre Volost bordered Kolo Volost approximately along the line between Kildin Island and Turiy Headland of the Turiy Peninsula. Tre Volost was situated to the east of that line, while Kolo Volost lay to the west of it.
