= Lake Lovozero =

Lake in Murmansk Oblast, Russia

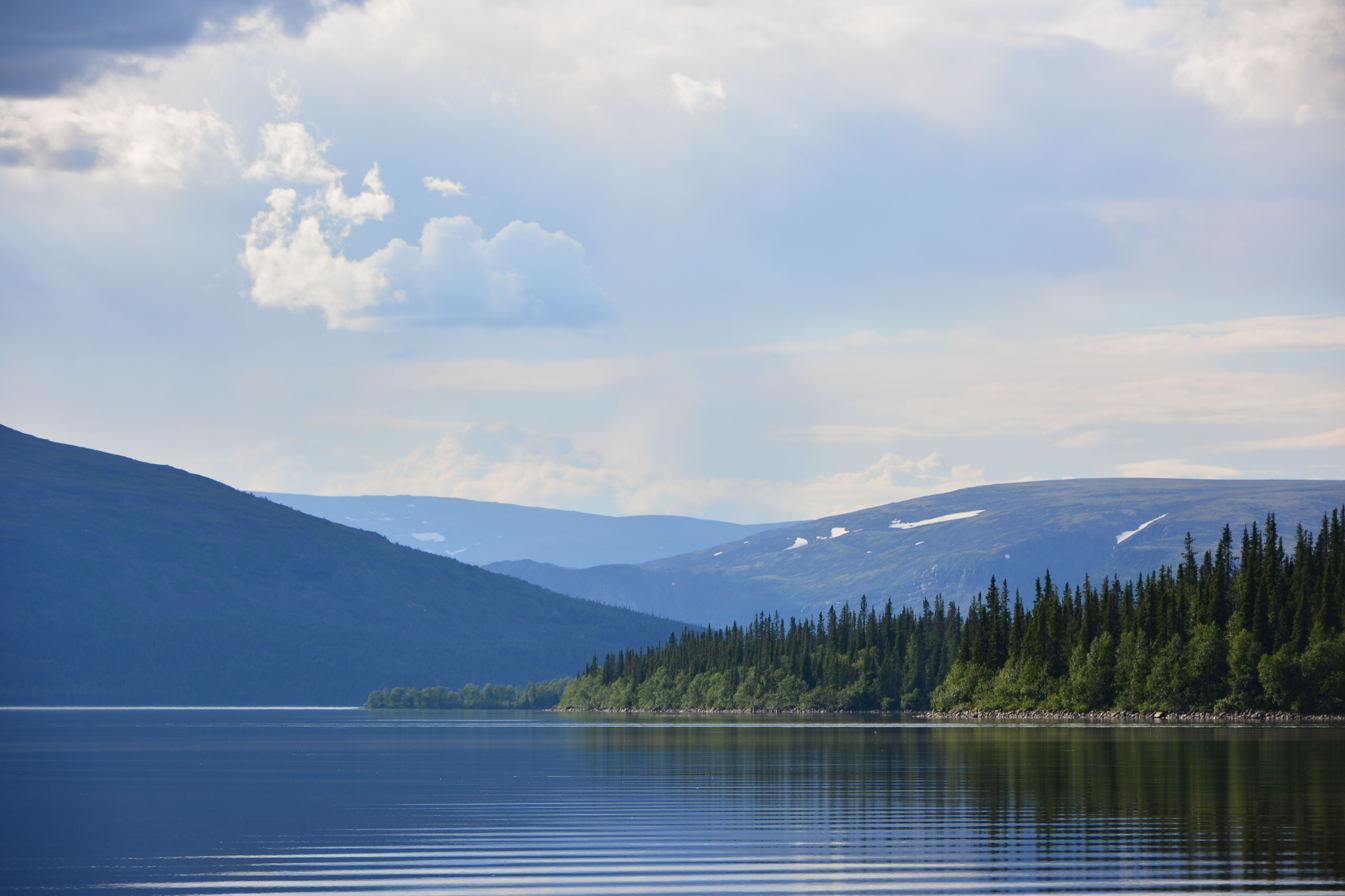

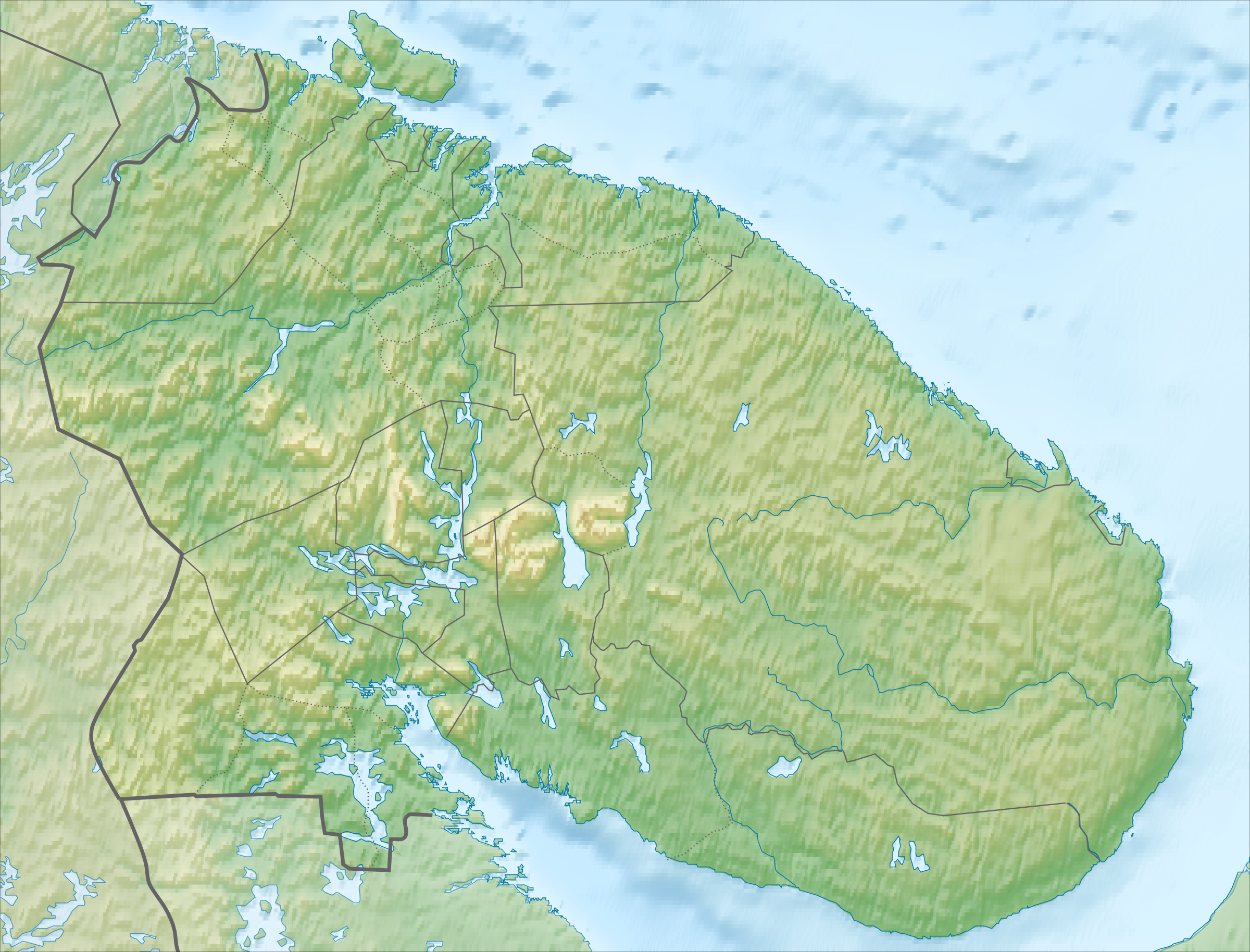
- Location within Murmansk Oblast Location within Russia
- Location: Kola Peninsula, Murmansk Oblast
- Coordinates: 67°54′N 35°12′E
- Type: natural lake, reservoir
- Primary inflows: Voronya, Seydyavryok
- Primary outflows: Voronya
- Basin countries: Russia
- Surface area: 200 km^{2} (77 sq mi)
- Average depth: 5.7 m (19 ft)
- Max. depth: 35 m (115 ft)
- Residence time: 10 months

Lake Lovozero (Kildin Sami: Луяввьр, Skolt Sami: Luujäuʹrr, Russian: Ловозеро, Northern Sami: Lujávri, Finnish: Luujärvi) is located on the Kola Peninsula, in Murmansk Oblast within the Barents Sea basin and ensures runoff from the river Voronya. Area: 200 km², average depth is 5.7 metres, maximal 35 m. Annual fluctuations do not exceed 1 m, and the average period of water renewal is about 10 months. The lake has a winding coastline and many peninsulas and islands. The area surrounding the lake, e.g. the Lovozerskiye Tundras, is commonly known as "Ловозёрье" in Russian (Lovozerye, Lovozyorye).

In 1970, two hydroelectric power plants were built on the Voronya River at Serebryansk, about 100 kilometers downstream from the lake. The dam at the power plant created a reservoir on the Voronya with the same water level as Lake Lovozero, effectively turning the two bodies of water into one.

One of the most important rare-earth elements deposits of Europe is located in the Lake Lozovero and nearby areas of the Kola Peninsula.
