= Prirechny, Murmansk Oblast =

Prirechny Приречный
- Inhabited locality
- Interactive map of Prirechny
- Location of Prirechny Prirechny (Murmansk Oblast)
- Coordinates: 69°02′N 30°17′E
- Country: Russia
- Federal subject: Murmansk Oblast
- Administrative district: Pechengsky District

Population (2010 Census)
  - Total: 45
  - Estimate (2021): 15 (−66.7%)

Municipal status
  - Municipal district: Pechengsky Municipal District
  - Urban settlement: Nikel Urban Settlement
- Time zone: UTC+3 (MSK)
- Postal code: 184403
- Dialing code: +7 81554
- OKTMO ID: 47615151121

Prirechny (Russian: Прире́чный) is a rural locality (an inhabited locality) in Pechengsky District of Murmansk Oblast, Russia, located beyond the Arctic Circle at a height of 163 meters (535 ft) above sea level. Population: 45 (2010 Census).
