= Kola (river) =

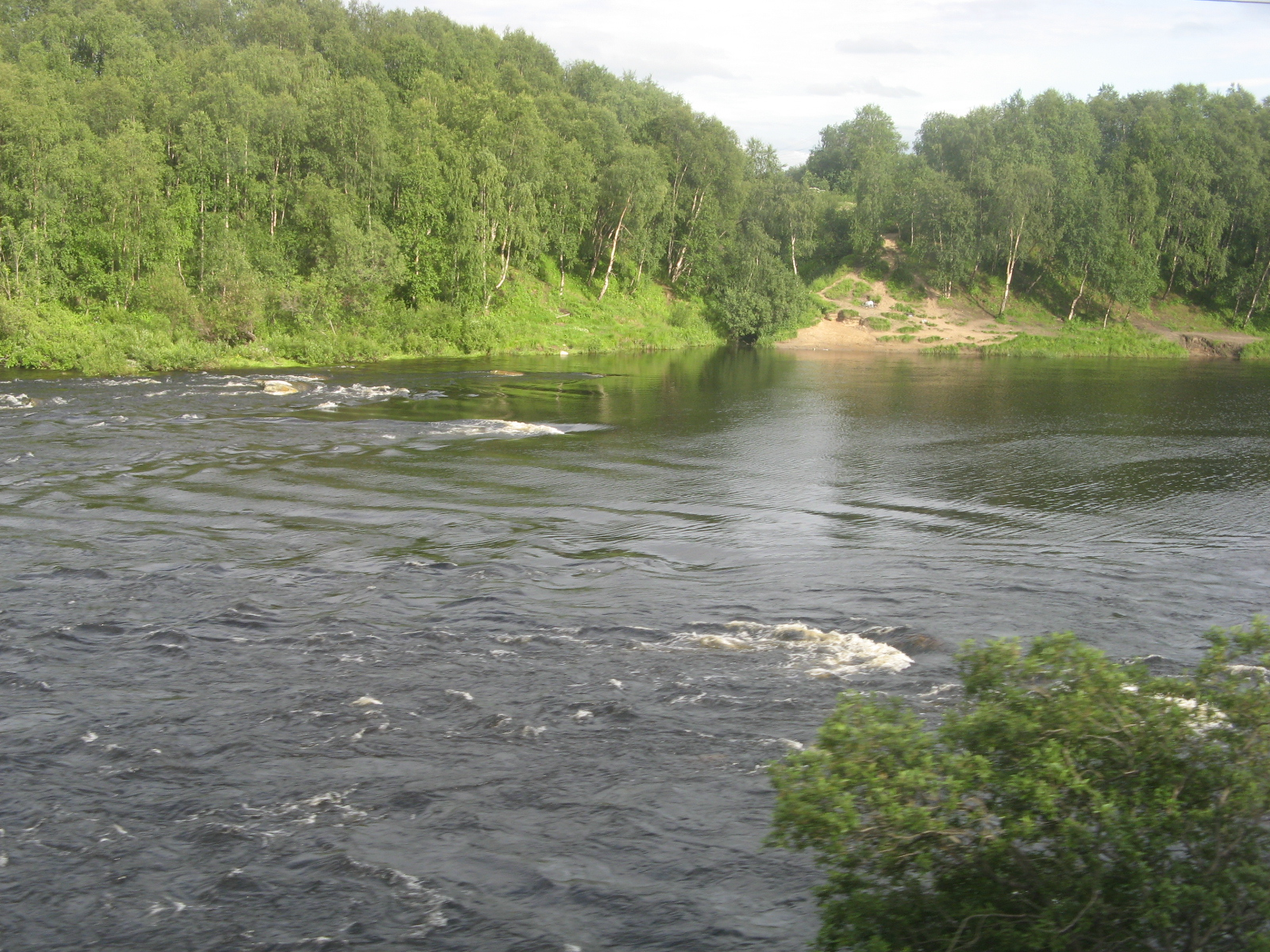

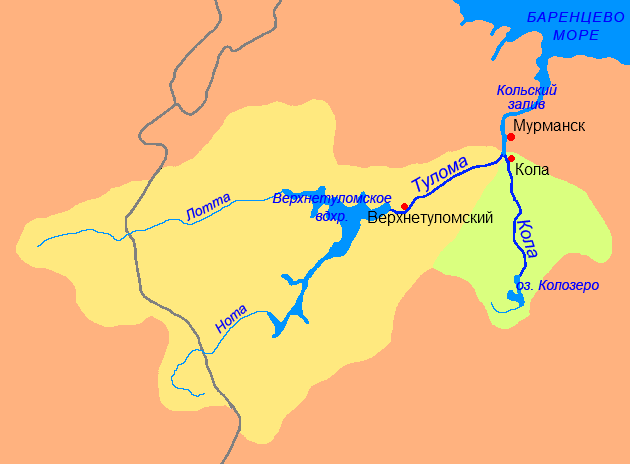
- Kola-Tuloma river basins. Kola basin in green

Location
- Country: Russia

Physical characteristics
- Source
  - location: Lake Kolozero
  - elevation: 140 m (460 ft)
- Mouth
  - location: Kola Bay
  - coordinates: 68.8868°N 33.0353°E
- Length: 83 km (52 mi)
- Basin size: 3,850 km^{2} (1,490 sq mi)
- Discharge
  - average: 40 m^{3}/s (1,400 cu ft/s)

The Kola (Russian: Кола) is a river on the Kola Peninsula in Murmansk Oblast, Russia. It is 83 kilometres (52 mi) long, and has a drainage basin of 3,850 square kilometres (1,490 sq mi). The river flows out of Lake Kolozero north into the Kola Bay of the Barents Sea, some 10 km south of Murmansk. The neighbouring river Tuloma has its mouth just one kilometer to the west. The average discharge is 40 m^{3}/s, but there are large seasonal variations. Its largest tributaries is Kitza and Orlovka from the right, and Tukhta and Medvezhya from the left. The only town on the river is also called Kola.
