= Turiy Peninsula =

Peninsula in Murmansk Oblast, Russia

Coordinates: 66°35′N 34°32′E

Map of Turiy Peninsula (in Russian)

Turiy Peninsula (Russian: Турий полуостров) is a peninsula located in Murmansk Oblast, Russia, protruding from the Kandalaksha Coast in the southern part of the Kola Peninsula into the White Sea, with Sosnovaya Bay to the northwest and Karzh Bay to the east. The peninsula is 15 kilometers (9.3 mi), 10 kilometers (6.2 mi) wide and its highest point, the Letnyaya hill, reaches a height of 172 meters (564 ft) above sea level. There are multiple small lakes on the peninsula, with the biggest ones being Letnegorskoye and Golyshevo.

An open-air museum featuring a reconstructed Pomor fishing homestead, Tonya Tetrina, is located on the peninsula, about 30 kilometers (19 mi) away from the closest settlement Umba.
