= Kola Bay =

Fjord in the Russian Arctic

Coordinates: 69°05′52″N 33°23′48″E

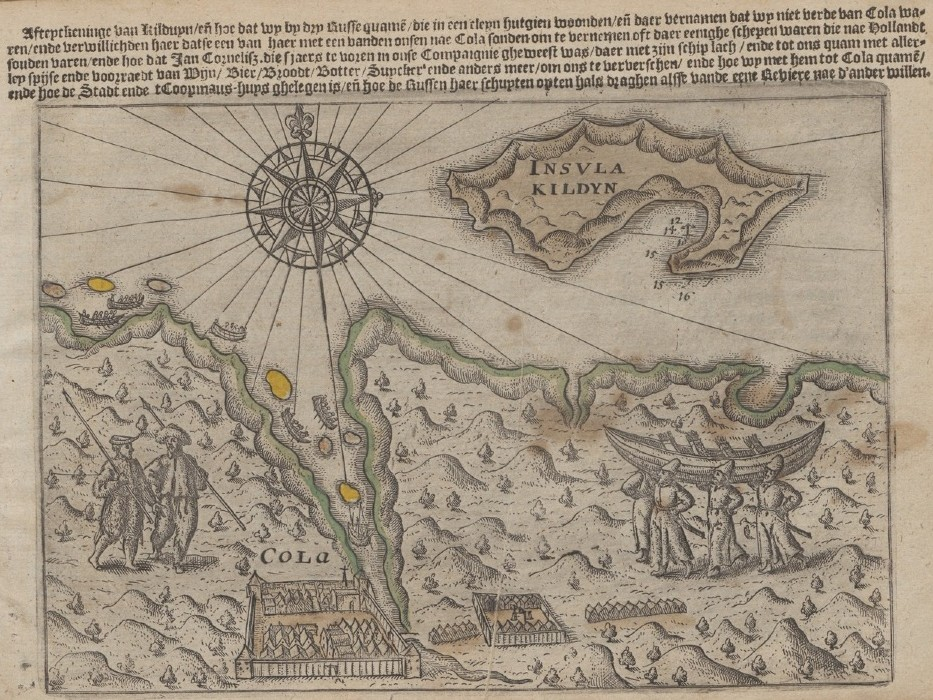
1598 map of Kola Bay, from Gerrit de Veer's diary of Willem Barentsz' explorations.

Kola Bay (Russian: Кольский залив) or Murmansk Fjord is a 57-km-long fjord of the Barents Sea that cuts into the northern part of the Kola Peninsula. It is up to 7 km wide and has a depth of 200 to 300 metres. The Tuloma, Rosta and Kola Rivers discharge into the bay.

The eastern shore is craggy and precipitous, the western one is comparatively level. The ports of Murmansk and Severomorsk sit on the east side. Polyarny, the main base of Russia's Northern Fleet, is on the west side of the bay.

Semidiurnal tides in the Murmansk Fjord are as high as 4 metres. In winter, the southern part of the bay may be covered in ice, though it is usually not thick enough to impede navigation, and Murmansk has traditionally been Russia's northernmost ice-free port. The Kola Bay Bridge spans the Kola Bay near its southern end.

== See also ==
- List of fjords of Russia
