= Kandalaksha Coast =

Coast of the White Sea, Russia

Coordinates: 66°46′41″N 33°23′43″E

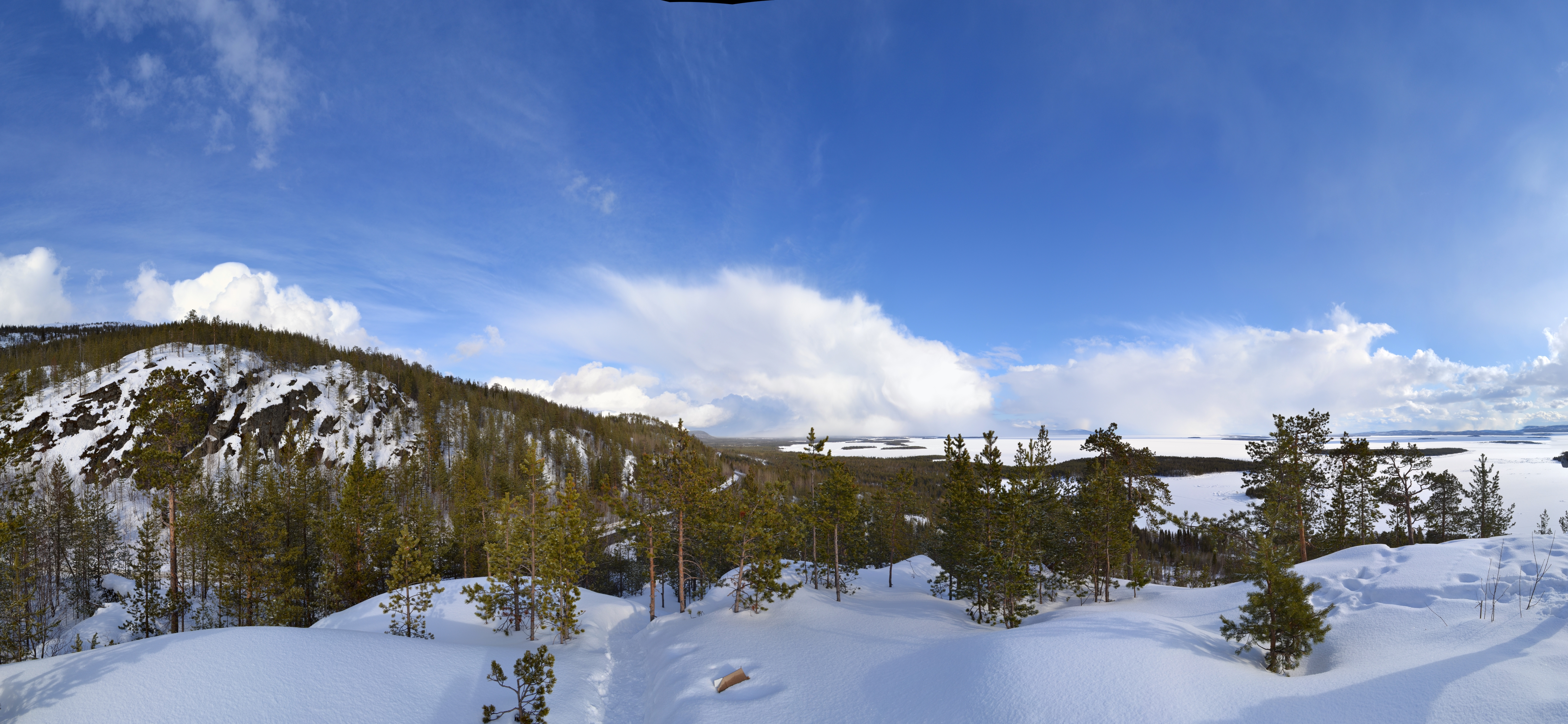
Kandalaksha Coast

The Kandalaksha Coast (Russian: Кандалакшский берег) is a coastal area in Murmansk Oblast in northwest Russia. It is located on the northern side of the White Sea, between Kandalaksha and mouth of Varzuga River. The major rivers flowing to the sea at the coast are the Umba and the Niva.

Administratively, the Kandalaksha Coast is shared between Kandalakshsky and Tersky Districts of Murmansk Oblast.

The cities and villages of Kandalaksha, Luvenga, Kolvitsa, Umba, Olenitsa, Kashkarantsy are all located at the Kandalaksha Coast. The coast was populated not later than 13th century by the Pomors.

Kandalaksha Coast (excluding Kandalakshsky District) is included into border security zone, intended to protect the borders of Russian Federation from unwanted activity. In order to visit the zone, a permit issued by the local FSB department is required.
