= Ruchyi =

Ruchyi (Russian: Ручьи́) is the name of several rural localities in Russia.

== Arkhangelsk Oblast ==
As of 2022, two rural localities in Arkhangelsk Oblast bear this name:

- Ruchyi, Mezensky District, Arkhangelsk Oblast, a selo in Ruchyevsky Selsoviet of Mezensky District
- Ruchyi, Pinezhsky District, Arkhangelsk Oblast, a settlement in Lavelsky Selsoviet of Pinezhsky District

== Kaliningrad Oblast ==
As of 2022, one rural locality in Kaliningrad Oblast bears this name:

- Ruchyi, Kaliningrad Oblast, a settlement in Znamensky Rural Okrug of Gvardeysky District

== Leningrad Oblast ==
As of 2022, six rural localities in Leningrad Oblast bear this name:

- Ruchyi, Kingiseppsky District, Leningrad Oblast, a village in Vistinskoye Settlement Municipal Formation of Kingiseppsky District
- Ruchyi, Kirovsky District, Leningrad Oblast, a village in Sukhovskoye Settlement Municipal Formation of Kirovsky District
- Ruchyi, Luzhsky District, Leningrad Oblast, a village in Dzerzhinskoye Settlement Municipal Formation of Luzhsky District
- Ruchyi, Tosnensky District, Leningrad Oblast, a village in Trubnikoborskoye Settlement Municipal Formation of Tosnensky District
- Ruchyi, Volkhovsky District, Leningrad Oblast, a village in Pashskoye Settlement Municipal Formation of Volkhovsky District
- Ruchyi, Vyborgsky District, Leningrad Oblast, a logging depot settlement under the administrative jurisdiction of Kamennogorskoye Settlement Municipal Formation of Vyborgsky District

== Murmansk Oblast ==
As of 2022, one rural locality in Murmansk Oblast bears this name:

- Ruchyi, Murmansk Oblast, a railway station in Belomorsky Territorial Okrug of Kandalakshsky District

== Nizhny Novgorod Oblast ==
As of 2022, one rural locality in Nizhny Novgorod Oblast bears this name:

- Ruchyi, Nizhny Novgorod Oblast, a village in Murzitsky Selsoviet of Sechenovsky District

== Novgorod Oblast ==
As of 2022, seven rural localities in Novgorod Oblast bear this name:

- Ruchyi, Krestetsky District, Novgorod Oblast, a village in Ruchyevskoye Settlement of Krestetsky District
- Ruchyi, Lyubytinsky District, Novgorod Oblast, a village under the administrative jurisdiction of the urban-type settlement of Lyubytino, Lyubytinsky District
- Ruchyi, Poddorsky District, Novgorod Oblast, a village in Poddorskoye Settlement of Poddorsky District
- Ruchyi, Podgoshchskoye Settlement, Shimsky District, Novgorod Oblast, a village in Podgoshchskoye Settlement of Shimsky District
- Ruchyi, Shimsk, Shimsky District, Novgorod Oblast, a village under the administrative jurisdiction of the urban-type settlement of Shimsk, Shimsky District
- Ruchyi, Valdaysky District, Novgorod Oblast, a village in Semenovshchinskoye Settlement of Valdaysky District
- Ruchyi, Volotovsky District, Novgorod Oblast, a village in Gorskoye Settlement of Volotovsky District

== Pskov Oblast ==
As of 2022, five rural localities in Pskov Oblast bear this name:

- Ruchyi, Bezhanitsky District, Pskov Oblast, a village in Bezhanitsky District
- Ruchyi, Dedovichsky District, Pskov Oblast, a village in Dedovichsky District
- Ruchyi, Dnovsky District, Pskov Oblast, a village in Dnovsky District
- Ruchyi, Gdovsky District, Pskov Oblast, a village in Gdovsky District
- Ruchyi, Palkinsky District, Pskov Oblast, a village in Palkinsky District

== Sakhalin Oblast ==
As of 2022, one rural locality in Sakhalin Oblast bears this name:

- Ruchyi, Sakhalin Oblast, a selo in Dolinsky District

== Tver Oblast ==
As of 2022, four rural localities in Tver Oblast bear this name:

- Ruchyi, Andreapolsky District, Tver Oblast, a village in Andreapolsky District
- Ruchyi, Kimrsky District, Tver Oblast, a village in Kimrsky District
- Ruchyi, Konakovsky District, Tver Oblast, a village in Konakovsky District
- Ruchyi, Rameshkovsky District, Tver Oblast, a village in Rameshkovsky District

== Vologda Oblast ==
As of 2022, one rural locality in Vologda Oblast bears this name:

- Ruchyi, Vologda Oblast, a village in Nikolo-Ramensky Selsoviet of Cherepovetsky District
