= Veliky Island =

Island in Kandalaksha Gulf, White Sea, Russia

Coordinates: 66°34′04″N 33°19′6″E

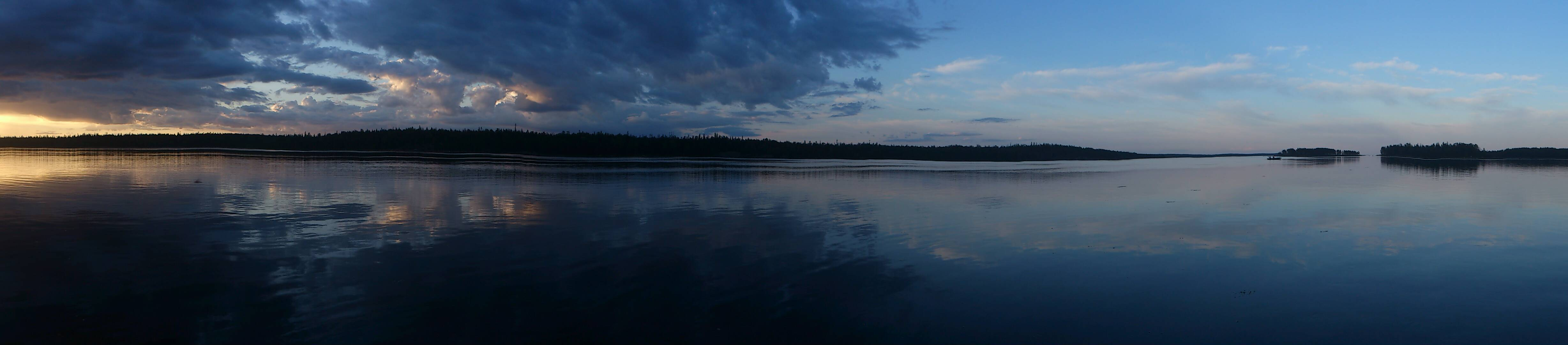
Veliky Island, a view from gthe White Sea Biological Station

Veliky Island (Russian: Великий остров) is an island on the White Sea, off the Karelian Coast of Kandalaksha Gulf, 21 km long, 8km wide. There used to be a hermitage of Old Believers.

The island, together with other islands of the Kandalaksha Gulf, is part of the Kandalaksha Nature Reserve, and therefore navigation within the 500-meter zone off the island, as well as visiting the island are forbidden.
