= Beloye More (rural locality) =

Beloye More Белое Море
- Inhabited locality
- Interactive map of Beloye More
- Location of Beloye More Beloye More (Murmansk Oblast)
- Coordinates: 67°05′N 32°15′E
- Country: Russia
- Federal subject: Murmansk Oblast
- Administrative district: Kandalakshsky District
- Territorial OkrugSelsoviet: Belomorsky Territorial Okrug
- Founded: 1969

Population (2010 Census)
  - Total: 660
  - Estimate (2021): 437 (−33.8%)

Municipal status
  - Municipal district: Kandalakshsky Municipal District
  - Urban settlement: Kandalaksha Urban Settlement
- Time zone: UTC+3 (MSK)
- Postal code: 184030
- Dialing code: +7 81533
- OKTMO ID: 47608101126

Beloye More (Russian: Бе́лое Мо́ре) is a rural locality (an inhabited locality) in Kandalakshsky District of Murmansk Oblast, Russia, located beyond the Arctic Circle at a height of 17 meters (56 ft) above sea level. As of the 2010 census, the settlement had 660 inhabitants.

Beloye More was established in 1969. It was officially registered in 1971 and replaced the village of Kandalaksha (distinct from the town) as the center of a selsoviet. At the same time, the older railway settlement of Beloye more [sic], established sometime before 1938, was merged into the new settlement. At the time of its establishment, the selsoviet also included the settlements of Fedoseyevka, Kirki, Kolvitsa, Luvenga, Neblagorsky, Palkina Guba, Pinozero, Plesozero, Prolivy, Ruchyi and Zhemchuzhnaya.

The Vitino oil port is located in Beloye More.
