= Kandalakshskoye Rural Community =

District in 19th century Russian empire

Kandalakshskoye Rural Community (Russian: Кандала́кшское се́льское о́бщество) was an administrative division (a rural community) of Kemsky Uyezd of Arkhangelsk Governorate of the Russian Empire, which existed in 1861–1866.

Kandalakshskoye Rural Community was one of the eight rural communities of Kemsky Uyezd created on March 8 [O.S. February 25], 1861 to replace volosts. The rural community had the same rights as the volosts in other uyezds.

As of the time of its creation, it included the settlements of Kandalaksha, Knyazhaya Guba, and Kovda.

In 1866, the rural community was transformed into Kovdskaya Volost.
