= Fedoseyevka =

Fedoseyevka (Russian: Федосеевка) is the name of several rural localities in Russia:

- Fedoseyevka, Belgorod Oblast, a selo in Starooskolsky District of Belgorod Oblast
- Fedoseyevka, Murmansk Oblast, a selo in Belomorsky Territorial Okrug of Kandalakshsky District of Murmansk Oblast
- Fedoseyevka, Omsk Oblast, a village in Krasnousovsky Rural Okrug of Tyukalinsky District of Omsk Oblast
- Fedoseyevka, Orenburg Oblast, a settlement in Novosimbirsky Selsoviet of Kuvandyksky District of Orenburg Oblast
- Fedoseyevka, Oryol Oblast, a village in Novosinetsky Selsoviet of Bolkhovsky District of Oryol Oblast
- Fedoseyevka, Neklinovsky District, Rostov Oblast, a settlement in Troitskoye Rural Settlement of Neklinovsky District of Rostov Oblast
- Fedoseyevka, Zavetinsky District, Rostov Oblast, a selo in Fedoseyevskoye Rural Settlement of Zavetinsky District of Rostov Oblast
