= Karelian Coast =

Coast of the White Sea in northwest Russia

Coordinates: 66°27′48″N 33°27′47″E

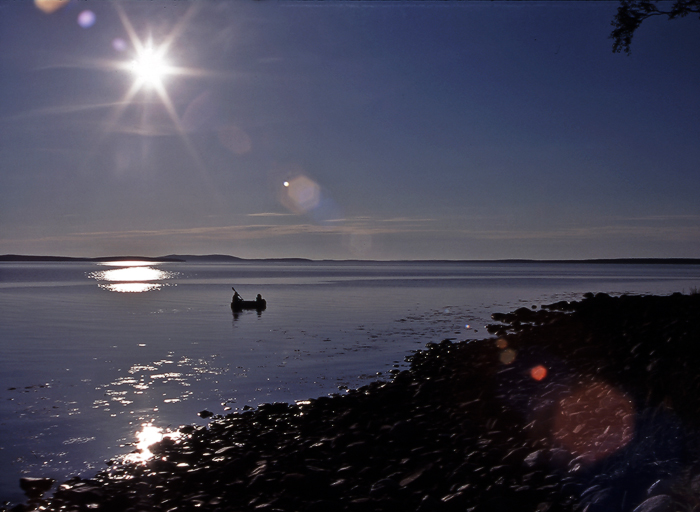
Karelian Coast

The Karelian Coast (Russian: Карельский берег) is a coastal area in Murmansk Oblast and the Republic of Karelia in northwest Russia. It is located on the western side of the White Sea, between the northwesternmost extremity of the Kandalaksha Gulf and the mouth of the river Kem. The major rivers flowing to the sea at the coast are the Kovda and the Kem.

Administratively, the Karelian Coast is shared between Kandalakshsky District of Murmansk Oblast and Kemsky and Loukhsky Districts of the Republic of Karelia.

Inhabited localities such as Kovda, Beloye More, Lesozavodsky, Kem are all located at the Karelian Coast. The coast has been populated by Pomors and Karelians since no later than the 13th century.
