= Kovda (disambiguation) =

Kovda is a river in Murmansk Oblast, Russia.

Kovda may also refer to the following rural localities in Kandalakshsky District of Murmansk Oblast, Russia:

- Kovda, Lesozavodsky Territorial Okrug, Kandalakshsky District, Murmansk Oblast, a selo in Lesozavodsky Territorial Okrug
- Kovda, Zelenoborsky, Kandalakshsky District, Murmansk Oblast, a railway station under the administrative jurisdiction of the urban-type settlement of Zelenoborsky
