= Lesozavodsky (rural locality) =

Lesozavodsky (Russian: Лесозаводский) or Lesozavodskoy (Лесозаводской; both masculine), Lesozavodskaya (Лесозаводская; feminine), or Lesozavodskoye (Лесозаводское) is the name of several rural localities in Russia.

Modern localities

- Lesozavodskoy, a settlement in Gorkhonsky Selsoviet of Zaigrayevsky District of the Republic of Buryatia
- Lesozavodsky, Murmansk Oblast, an inhabited locality in Lesozavodsky Territorial Okrug of Kandalakshsky District of Murmansk Oblast
- Lesozavodsky, Tyumen Oblast, a settlement in Tyunevsky Rural Okrug of Nizhnetavdinsky District of Tyumen Oblast

Alternative names

- Lesozavodskoy, alternative name of Lesozavodsky, an inhabited locality in Lesozavodsky Territorial Okrug of Kandalakshsky District of Murmansk Oblast
