= Zhemchuzhnaya =

Zhemchuzhnaya Жемчужная
- Railway station
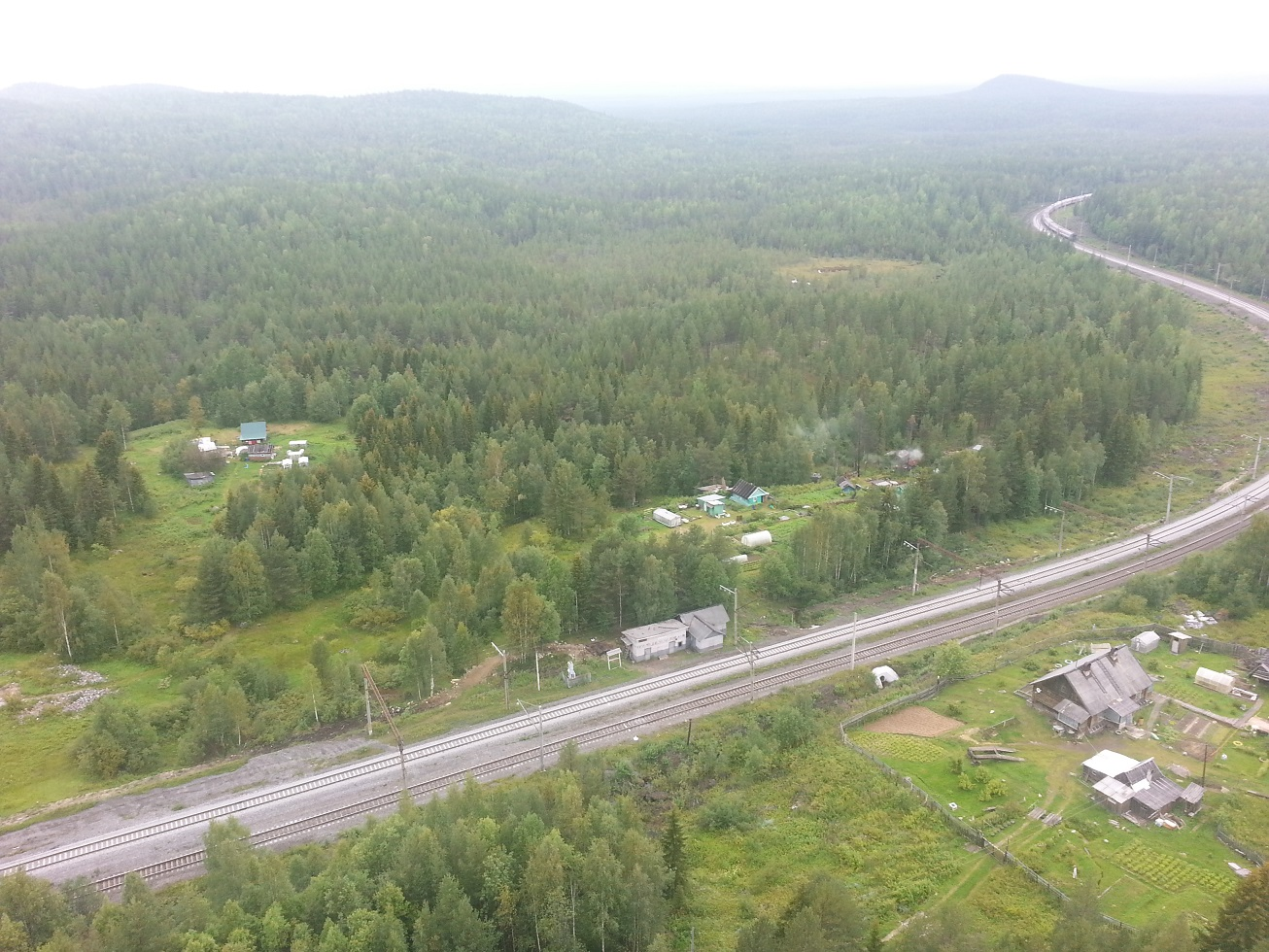
- Interactive map of Zhemchuzhnaya
- Location of Zhemchuzhnaya Zhemchuzhnaya (Murmansk Oblast)
- Coordinates: 66°55′19″N 32°12′34″E
- Country: Russia
- Federal subject: Murmansk Oblast
- Administrative district: Kandalakshsky District
- Urban-type settlementSelsoviet: Zelenoborsky

Population (2010 Census)
  - Total: 2
  - Estimate (2021): 1 (−50%)

Municipal status
  - Municipal district: Kandalakshsky Municipal District
  - Urban settlement: Zelenoborsky Urban Settlement
- Time zone: UTC+3 (MSK)
- Postal code: 184040
- Dialing code: +7 81533
- OKTMO ID: 47608158131

Zhemchuzhnaya (Russian: Жемчу́жная - lit. pearl) is a rural locality (a railway station) in Zelenoborsky Urban Settlement of Kandalakshsky District of Murmansk Oblast, Russia, located beyond the Arctic Circle at 316 km from Murmansk, 39 km from Kandalaksha.

Population: 3 - all Russians (2002 Census), 2 (2010 Census).

== History ==
It was founded in 1916.

Until May 28, 1938, it was part of Karelian Autonomous Soviet Socialist Republic. Then it was administratively subordinated to the Knyazhegubsky, Kandalakshsky, and Belomorsky Selsoviets. Since December 2, 2004, it has been part of the Zelenoborsky Urban Settlement.

== Transport ==
Zhemchuzhnaya is railway station at the October Railway (Saint Petersburg - Murmansk). Zhemchuzhnaya is located 1 km (0.62 mi) on a dirt road from the federal route R-21 Kola Highway (a part of the European route E105).

The rural locality is situated 162 km (101 mi) from Kirovsk–Apatity Airport and 281 km (175 mi) from Murmansk International Airport.
