= Kolvitsa =

Kolvitsa Колвица
- Selo
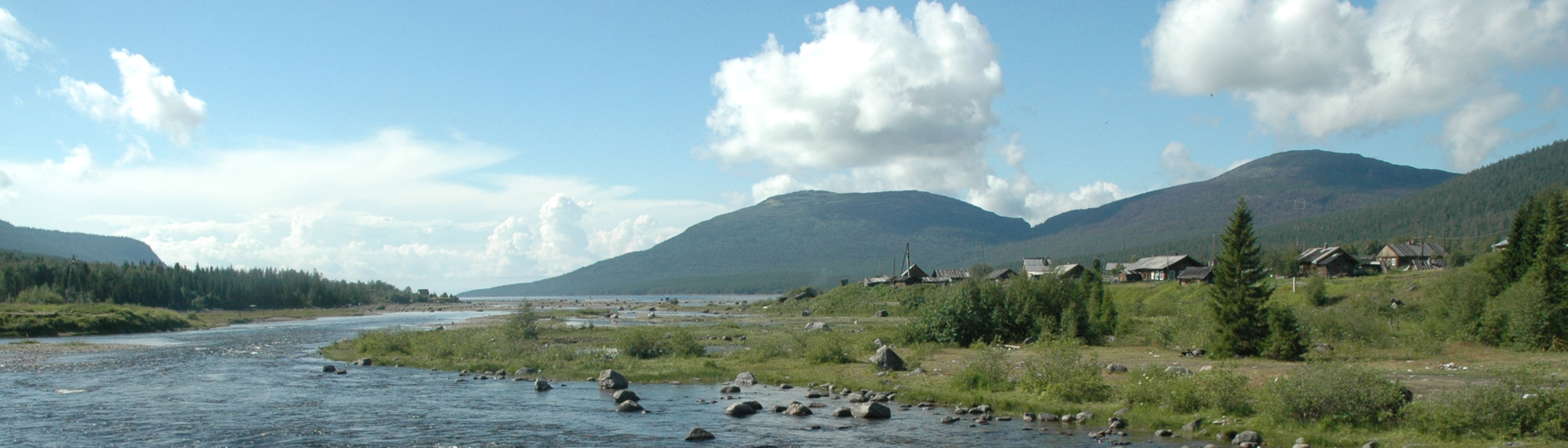
- View of Kolvitsa. The river Kolvitsa is in the foreground; Kolvitskaya Bay of the White Sea is in the background
- Interactive map of Kolvitsa
- Location of Kolvitsa Kolvitsa (Murmansk Oblast)
- Coordinates: 67°5′0″N 32°59′0″E
- Country: Russia
- Federal subject: Murmansk Oblast
- Administrative district: Kandalakshskiy District

Population (2010 Census)
  - Total: 9
  - Estimate (2021): 25 (+177.8%)
- Time zone: UTC+3 (MSK)
- Postal code: 184015
- Dialing code: +7 81533
- OKTMO ID: 47608101111

Kolvitsa (Russian: Ко́лвица) is a village (selo) in the administrative jurisdiction of the town of Kandalaksha in Murmansk Oblast, Russia. The village is located beyond the Arctic Circle, on the Kolvitsa river near its confluence with Kolvitskaya Bay of Kandalaksha Gulf, White Sea.

Municipally, the village is a part of Kandalaksha Urban Settlement in Kandalaksha Municipal District.

The first written mention of Kolvitsa dates back to 1563, when Mitrofan Kukin, a resident of Kandalaksha, donated his lands (including Kolvitsa) to Kandalaksha Monastery.
