= Beloye More =

Beloye More may refer to:

- Beloye More, Russian name for the White Sea, an inlet of the Barents Sea on the northwest coast of Russia
- Beloye More (rural locality), a rural locality in Kandalakshsky District of Murmansk Oblast, Russia
