= Lesozavodsky =

Lesozavodsky (masculine), Lesozavodskaya (feminine), or Lesozavodskoye (neuter) may refer to:

- Lesozavodsky Urban Okrug, a municipal formation, which the town of Lesozavodsk, Primorsky Krai, Russia, is incorporated as
- Lesozavodsky (rural locality) (Lesozavodskaya, Lesozavodskoye), name of several rural localities in Russia
