= White Sea Biological Station =

Educational and research centre in Russia

Coordinates: 66.5549°N 33.1056°E

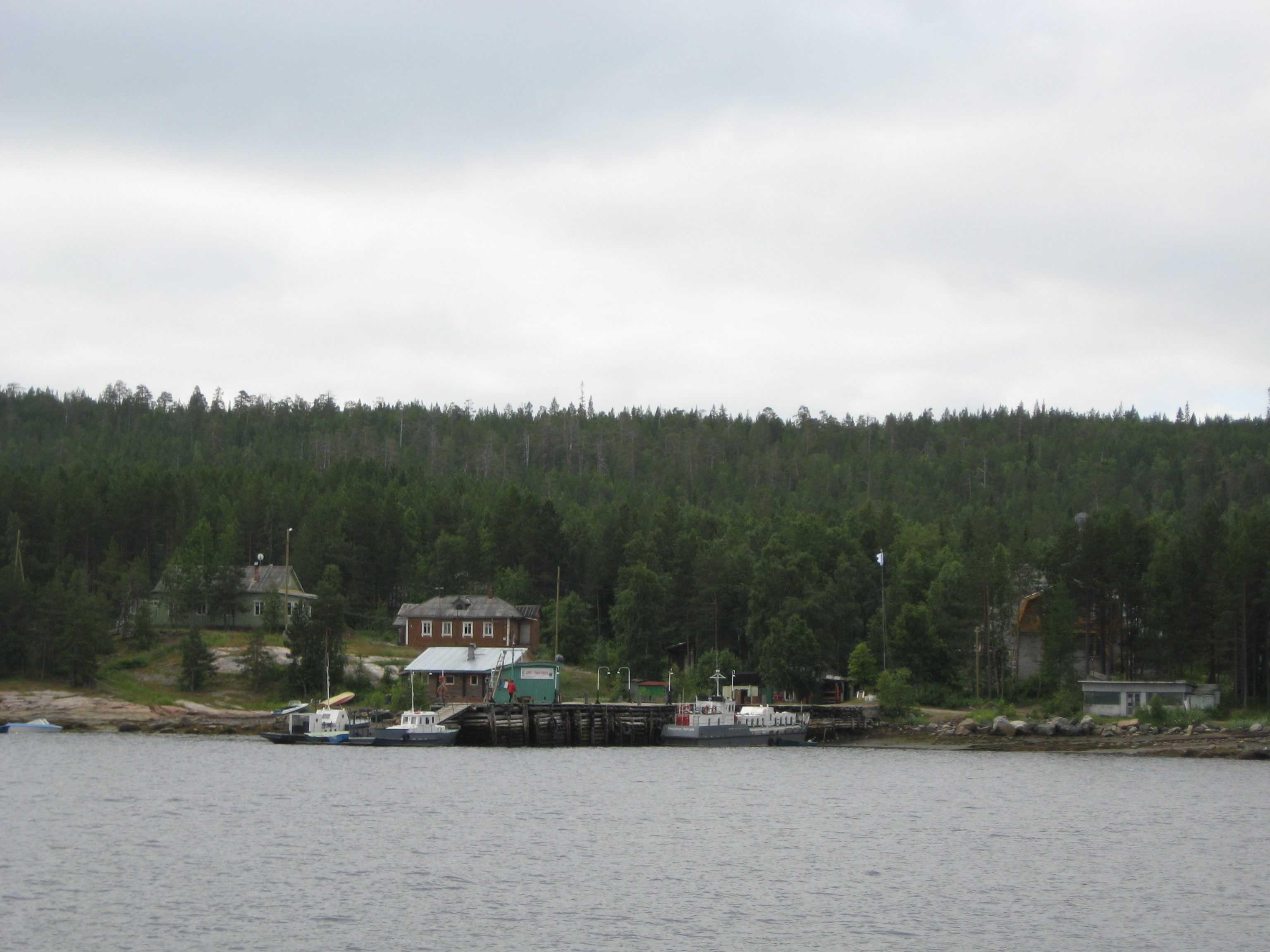
WSBS seen from Velikaja Salma

The White Sea Biological Station (WSBS) (Russian: Беломорская биологическая станция МГУ) named by A.N. Pertsov is an educational and research centre under the auspices of the Faculty of Biology of Moscow State University.

== Location ==
The station is situated on the Karelian coast of the White Sea. WSBS is an isolated settlement. There is no road and communication with nearest village Poyakonda and the rest of the world is possible by boats in summer time and by snow-mobiles in winter.

WSBS is situated on the Cape Kindo peninsula on the shore of Velikaja Salma Bay. Cape Kindo is a piece of untouched northern taiga with the mosaic of coniferous and deciduous forests, wetlands and small lakes. Along the shore there are some grass meadows. The whole territory of Cape Kindo included to large local nature park "Polarny Krug". Hunting and forestry are the very limited in this area. This is the area of Karelian skerries. Veliky Island, the largest island of the Kandalaksha State Nature Reserve is on the opposite side of the 500 m strait.

Velikaja Salma Bay is characterized by an especially rich fauna and flora, which is in part a result of the strong tidal currents that form in the narrow straits. These currents prevent the formation of the ice and make it possible for research activities to be continued throughout the year

== Climate ==
Relatively warm summer with temperature of air about 16 °C on average, temperature of surface water in summer sometime could be about 18–19 °C, but on the depths more than 25 m. It is always about zero. Winter is quite cold. The ice covers the White Sea from beginning of December to the first decade of May.

== History ==
The station was founded by a group of biologists from the university in 1938. One of the original members of this group, Nikolai Pertsov (1924–1987), devoted his whole life to building the station and became its director in 1951. The station took his name in 1995.

== Facilities ==
The station can provide guest scientists and students with basic scientific equipment, optical instruments and some other devices. The housing and laboratory facilities at the station can accommodate, simultaneously, up to 150 students and researchers in the summer period (from the end of May to the end of September). Few persons could be accommodated at the station in winter time. Guests are provided with rooms for 1, 2, 4 or 6 persons, and with bedding. Wood-burning stoves or electrical ovens provide heat. The station has a wooden bath-house. The dining-hall works for the summer months (June to September) only.

During the summer the station is supplied by the stations own small vessels and in winter by vehicle overland. Supply trips are usually made twice a week and special orders can be placed with the Provisioning Department. The station staff can arrange special excursions and provide all necessary assistance with regard to the organization of fieldwork, sampling, etc. The library of the station holds 35,000 publications, including books, scientific publications and periodicals; some of this material is in English, German, French and other languages. The station has a variety of boats and small vessels. Rowing boats are used for work close inshore. The station's Scuba diving service ensures that researchers are always able to collect fresh material without damaging the benthic communities. The wet lab with running seawater system is working during the Summer season from June to September.

Computer room, with wired and Wi-Fi internet access is available. The territory of the Station and the vicinities is covered by MegaFon GSM mobile phone operator.

== The botanical garden ==
The botanical garden at the station was founded by Vladimir Vekhov and Kirill Voskresensky in 1963. The garden has about 200 plant species including local species, representatives of the tundra and forest-tundra contiguous with the station territory, and also ornamental and introduced species.

The biological station is used as a base for training students from Moscow State University in marine science. The station staff can arrange special excursions and provide all necessary assistance with regard to the organization of fieldwork, sampling, etc. The library of the station holds 35,000 publications, including books, scientific publications and periodicals; some of these materials are in English, German, French and other languages.

== Educational programs ==
The biological station is used as a base for training students from Moscow State University in marine science, geography, geology, etc. During the summer season more than 350 students of five faculties of Moscow State University join different field courses at the Station. Most of them participate introduction courses in marine biology & biodiversity, but several courses are advanced educational programs, in different fields (invertebrate zoology, ichthyology, oceanography, hydrology, hydrobiology, mycology, phycology and other Non-vascular plants, comparative physiology, cell biology, histology, comparative embryology, comparative immunology and ecoimmunology.)

== Scientific projects ==
The scientific staff of the WSBS consists of 10 research scientists. They took part in a number of projects, working in co-operation with colleagues from different faculties of MSU, other institutes, and other countries. The main fields of research are as follows:

- Diversity, structure and functioning of marine and coastal ecosystems (mapping of bottom communities, composition, distribution and biology of marine invertebrates, both macro- and meiobenthic, pelago-benthic coupling).
- Sustainable coastal development at the local level, rational exploitation of coastal resources;
- Comparative morphology and phylogeny of animals,
- Marine fungi,
- Marine microbiology.

The Station's facilities are also used by visiting researchers.

== Solovki branch of the WSBS ==
Established in 1996. At the Solovki branch researchers conduct ornithological and botanical monitoring activities, Small groups of students or scientific visitors could be accommodated here during the summer time.

== See also ==
- List of research stations in the Arctic
