= Kolvitsa (river) =

River in Russia

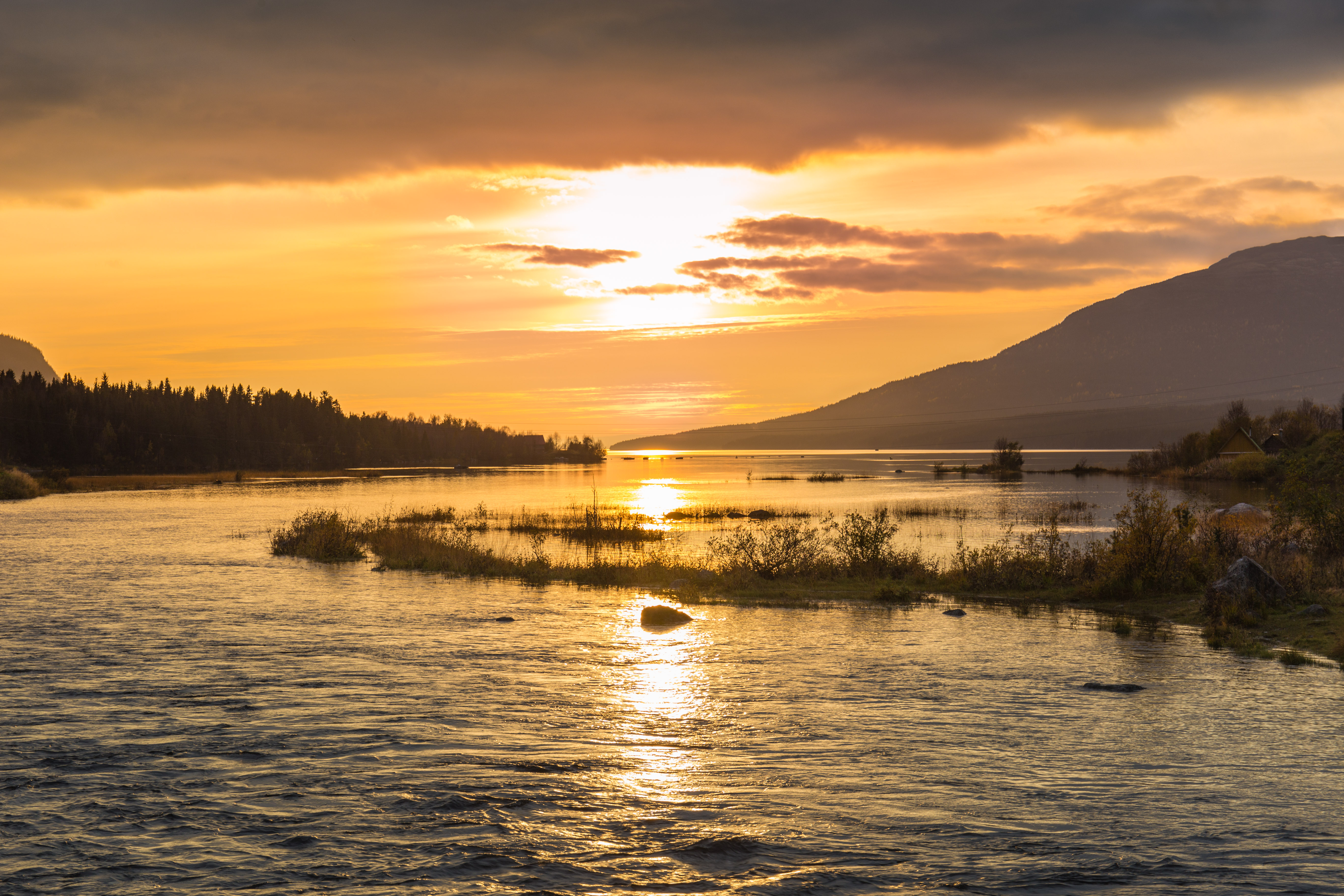
- Native name: Колвица (Russian)

Location
- Country: Russia
- Region: Murmansk Oblast

Physical characteristics
- Source: Lake Kolvitskoye
  - elevation: 58 m (190 ft)
- Mouth
  - location: Kolvitskaya Bay, Kandalaksha Gulf
  - elevation: 0 m (0 ft)
- Length: 9 km (5.6 mi)
- Basin size: 1,260 km^{2} (490 sq mi)

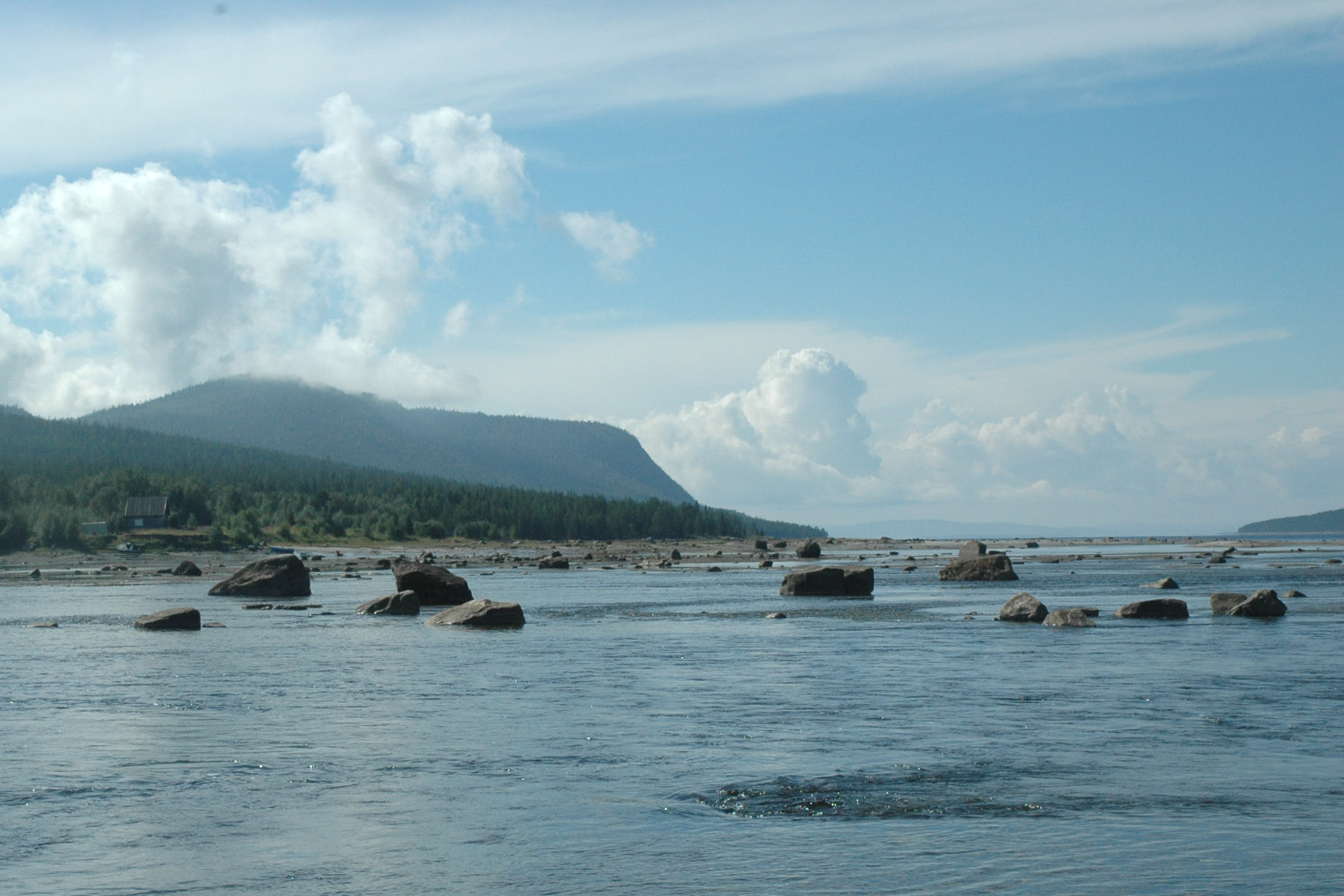
The Kolvitsa River near the Kolvitskaya Bay

The Kolvitsa (Russian: Колвица) is a river in the south of the Kola Peninsula in Murmansk Oblast, Russia. It is 9 kilometres (5.6 mi) in length. The Kolvitsa originates from Lake Kolvitskoye and flows into the Kolvitskaya Bay, Kandalaksha Gulf, White Sea near the village of Kolvitsa.
