= Nivsky =

Nivsky Нивский
- Inhabited locality
- Interactive map of Nivsky
- Location of Nivsky Nivsky (Murmansk Oblast)
- Coordinates: 67°17′57″N 32°29′03″E
- Country: Russia
- Federal subject: Murmansk Oblast

Population (2010 Census)
  - Total: 1,043
  - Estimate (2021): 847 (−18.8%)
- Time zone: UTC+3 (MSK)
- Postal code: 184070
- Dialing code: +7 81533
- OKTMO ID: 47608101121

Nivsky (Russian: Ни́вский) is a rural inhabited locality under the administrative jurisdiction of the town of Kandalaksha, Murmansk Oblast, Russia. It is located beyond the Arctic Circle, on the Kola Peninsula at a height of 99 meters (325 ft) above the sea level.

Nivsky was founded in 1929 as a settlement for the construction workers building a hydroelectric plant. Work settlement status was granted to it on June 6, 1933 by the Resolution of the Central Executive Committee of the Karelian ASSR, but it was demoted to a rural locality in 1995. When Kandalakshsky District of the Karelian ASSR was transferred to Murmansk Oblast in 1938, Nivsky became a part of the latter.
