= Kovda, Zelenoborsky, Kandalakshsky District, Murmansk Oblast =

Kovda Ковда
- Railway station
- Interactive map of Kovda
- Location of Kovda Kovda (Murmansk Oblast)
- Coordinates: 66°42′28″N 32°39′27″E
- Country: Russia
- Federal subject: Murmansk Oblast
- Administrative district: Kandalakshsky District
- Urban-type settlementSelsoviet: Zelenoborsky

Population (2010 Census)
  - Total: 37
  - Estimate (2021): 27 (−27%)

Municipal status
  - Municipal district: Kandalakshsky Municipal District
  - Urban settlement: Zelenoborsky Urban Settlement
- Time zone: UTC+3 (MSK)
- Postal code: 184040
- Dialing code: +7 81533
- OKTMO ID: 47608158126

Kovda (Russian: Ко́вда) is a rural locality (a railway station) in Kandalakshsky District of Murmansk Oblast, Russia, located beyond the Arctic Circle at a height of 18 meters (59 ft) above sea level. Population: 37 (2010 Census).
