= Knyazhaya Guba =

Knyazhaya Guba Княжая Губа
- Selo
- Interactive map of Knyazhaya Guba
- Location of Knyazhaya Guba Knyazhaya Guba (Murmansk Oblast)
- Coordinates: 66°52′0″N 32°23′11″E
- Country: Russia
- Federal subject: Murmansk Oblast
- Administrative district: Kandalakshskiy District

Population (2010 Census)
  - Total: 127
  - Estimate (2021): 91 (−28.3%)
- Time zone: UTC+3 (MSK)
- Postal code: 184020
- Dialing code: +7 81533
- OKTMO ID: 47608158106

Knyazhaya Guba (Russian: Княжа́я Губа́, Finnish: Knäsöi) is a rural locality (a Selo) in Kandalakshskiy District of Murmansk Oblast, Russia. The village is located beyond the Arctic Circle, on the Kola Peninsula. It is 53 m above sea level.
