= Lake Kolvitskoye =

Lake in Murmansk Oblast, Russia

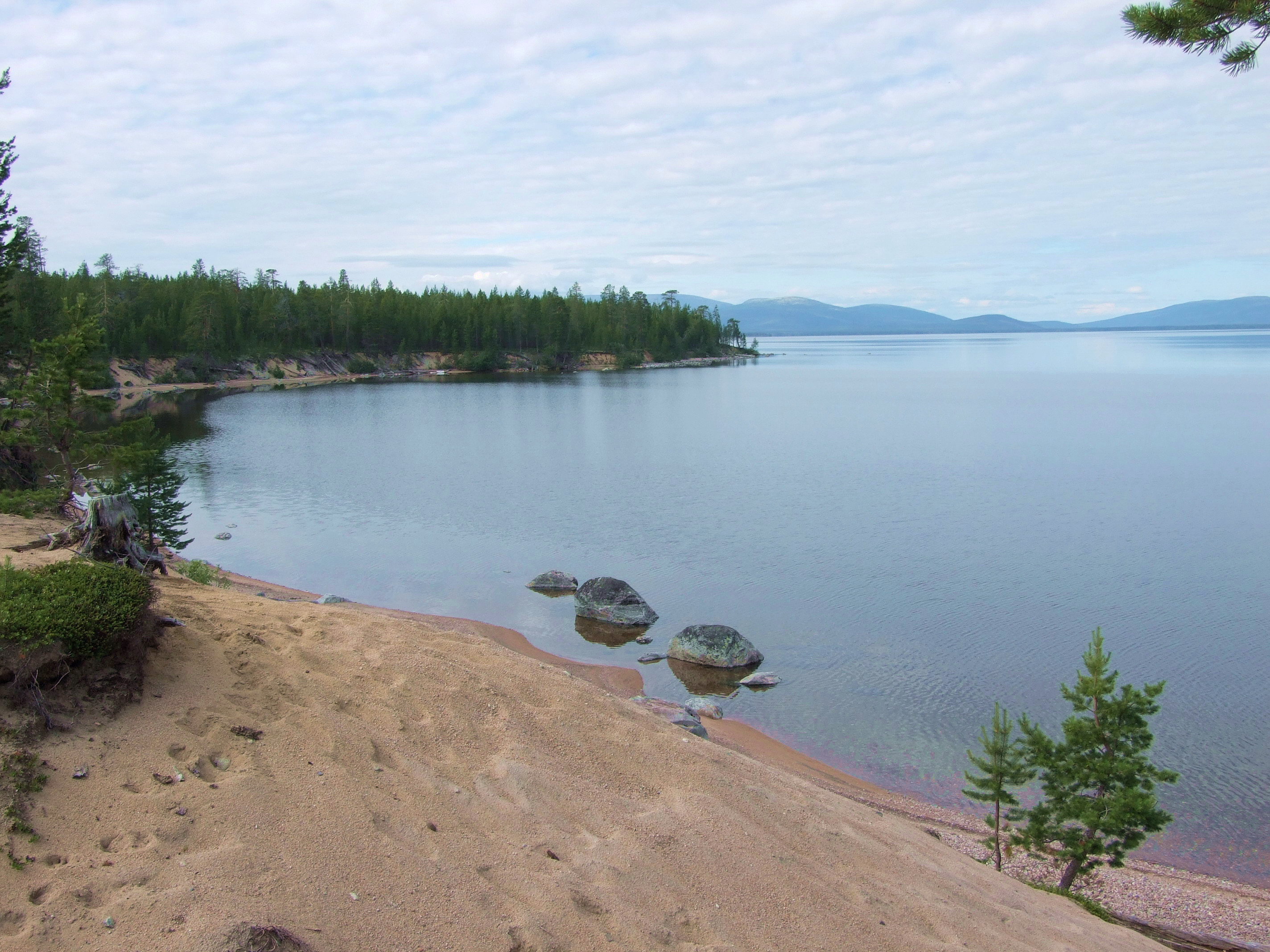

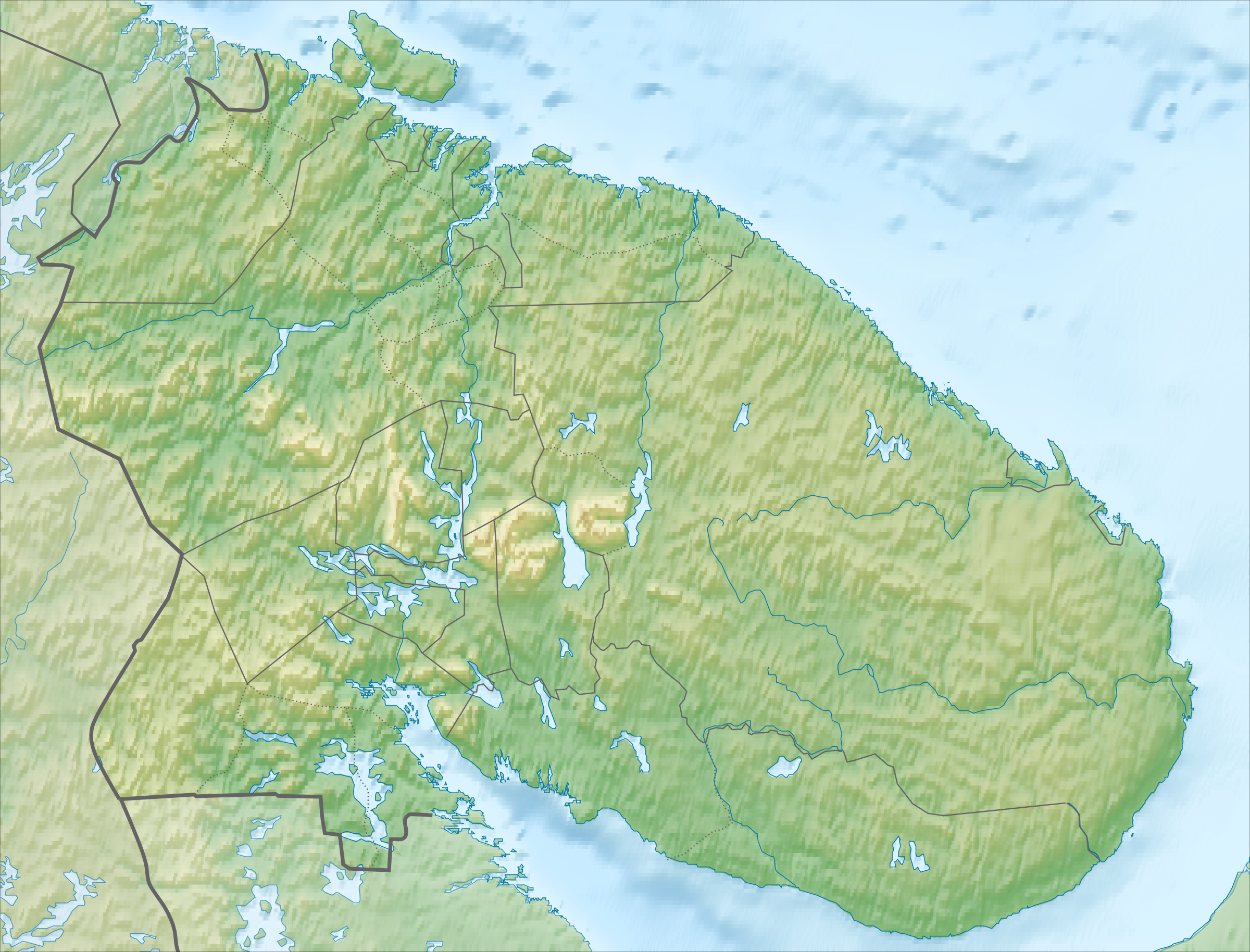
- Location within Murmansk Oblast Location within Russia
- Location: Kola Peninsula, Murmansk Oblast
- Coordinates: 67.0767°N 33.4431°E
- Primary outflows: Kolvitsa River
- Basin countries: Russia
- Surface area: 121 km^{2} (47 sq mi)
- Max. depth: 20 m (66 ft)
- Surface elevation: 61 m (200 ft)

Lake Kolvitskoye (Russian: Колвицкое озеро) is a large freshwater lake on the Kola Peninsula, Murmansk Oblast, Russia. It has an area of 121 km² and a maximum depth of 20 m. The Kolvitsa flows from the lake.
