= Vitino =

Port of the White Sea, Russia

Coordinates: 67°05′N 32°20′E

Vitino (Russian: Витино) is an oil port on the White Sea in Russia. It is located near Beloye More railway station, 28 kilometers by road south of Kandalaksha, Murmansk Oblast, on the western shore of Kandalaksha Gulf.

The port started operations in 1995, and since 2001 has been operating year-round. Its principal activity is transfer of oil and oil products arriving by rail from Russia's oil refineries to seagoing oil tankers for export. In 2004, 3.7 million tons of oil and oil products were handled by the port. Its full capacity at the time was 8 million tons a year.

The port can handle seagoing tankers with displacement up to 40,000 and with the dimensions up to:

- Length: 230 m,
- Beam – 32 m,
- Draft – 10.9 m.

There are also two piers for handling smaller sea-and-river going boats.
