= Nina Varlamova =

Russian politician (1954–2008)

- Born: 11 February 1954
- Died: 17 December 2008 (aged 54); Russia

Nina Konstantinovna Varlamova (Russian: Нина Константиновна Варламова; 11 February 1954 – 17 December 2008) was a Russian politician. She was born on 11 February 1954. Varlamova served as the mayor of the northern town of Kandalaksha in Murmansk Oblast. Varlamova was elected Mayor of Kandalaksha in 2007.

== Death ==
Varlamova was killed by a mentally unstable man on 17 December 2008. She was 54 years old. The man had reportedly threatened Varlamova several times leading up to her murder, though she had never taken his threats seriously. She was found lying in the street around 9 pm with knife wounds to her neck. She had managed to drag herself 15 meters from the scene of the attack before collapsing.

The suspect was identified as Dmitry Kireyev, who was 51 years old at the time. Kireyev, a former municipal council member and the former editor of a local newspaper, had been unemployed in recent years. Kandalaksha Police Chief Anatoly Prokopenko called Varlamova's attack a "spontaneous murder."

Varlamova was the third Russian mayor to be murdered in a span of less than 30 days. Magomed Barakhoyev, the mayor of a district within Nazran, Ingushetia, was shot and killed on 17 November 2008, while Vladikavkaz Mayor Vitaly Karayev was also killed in a shooting on 26 November 2008.
