= Prolivy =

Prolivy Проливы
- Railway station
- Interactive map of Prolivy
- Location of Prolivy Prolivy (Murmansk Oblast)
- Coordinates: 67°06′40″N 32°13′54″E
- Country: Russia
- Federal subject: Murmansk Oblast
- Administrative district: Kandalakshsky District
- Territorial OkrugSelsoviet: Belomorsky Territorial Okrug

Population (2010 Census)
  - Total: 42
  - Estimate (2021): 0 (−100%)

Municipal status
  - Municipal district: Kandalakshsky Municipal District
  - Urban settlement: Kandalaksha Urban Settlement
- Time zone: UTC+3 (MSK)
- Postal code: 184040
- Dialing code: +7 81533
- OKTMO ID: 47608101136

Prolivy (Russian: Проли́вы) is a rural locality (a railway station) in Kandalakshsky District of Murmansk Oblast, Russia, located beyond the Arctic Circle at a height of 19 meters (62 ft) above sea level. Population: 42 (2010 Census).
