= Fedoseyevka, Belgorod Oblast =

Fedoseyevka Федосеевка
- Selo
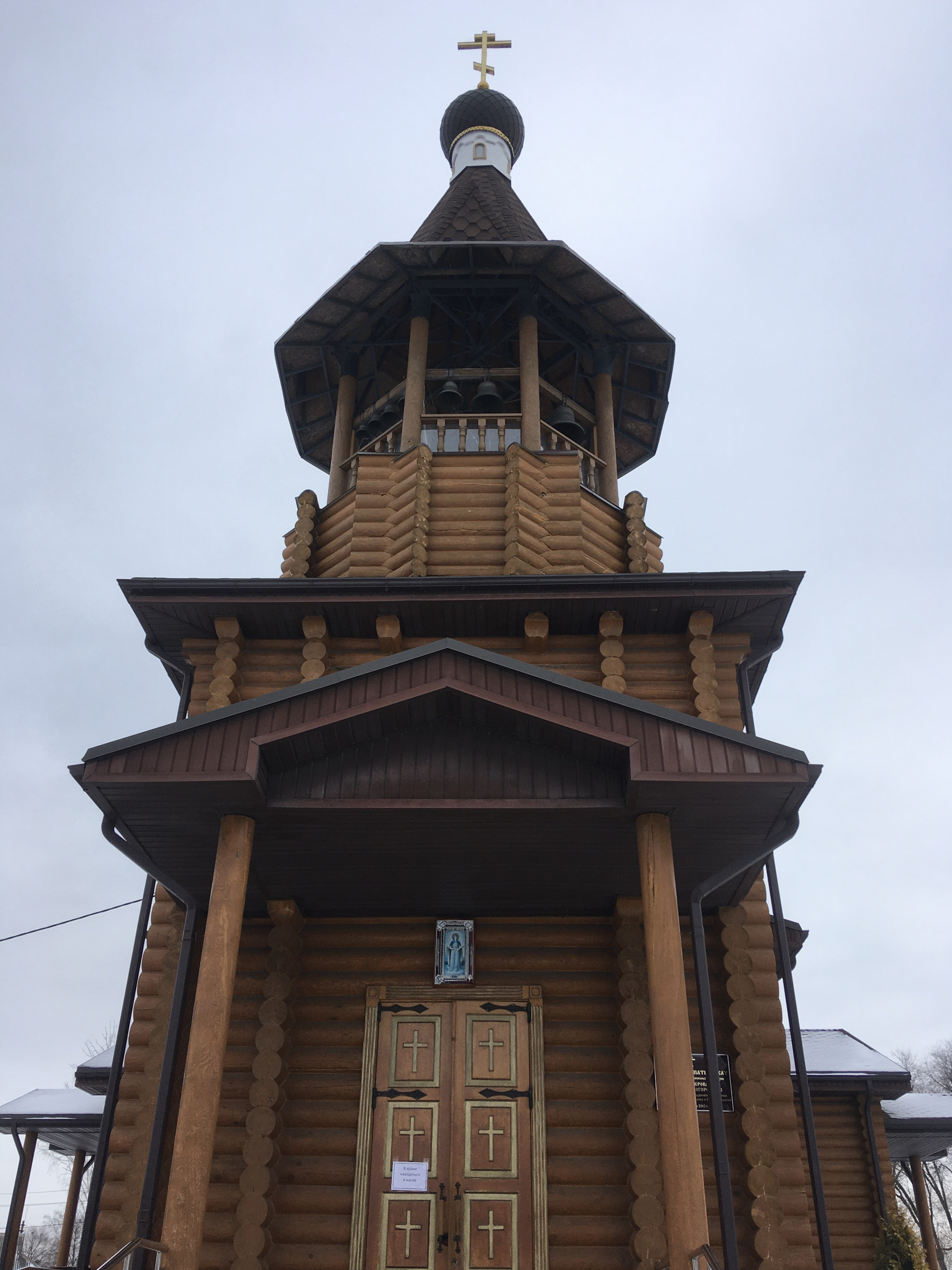

- Location within Belgorod Oblast Location within Russia
- Coordinates: 51°21′N 37°47′E
- Country: Russia
- Region: Belgorod Oblast
- District: Starooskolsky District
- Time zone: UTC+3:00

Fedoseyevka (Russian: Федосеевка) is a rural locality (a selo) in Starooskolsky District, Belgorod Oblast, Russia. The population was 2,766 as of 2010. There are 94 streets.

== Geography ==
Fedoseyevka is located 7 km north of Stary Oskol (the district's administrative centre) by road. Kaplino is the nearest rural locality.
