= Lesozavodsky, Murmansk Oblast =

Lesozavodsky Лесозаводский
- Inhabited locality
- Interactive map of Lesozavodsky
- Location of Lesozavodsky Lesozavodsky (Murmansk Oblast)
- Coordinates: 66°43′41″N 32°50′35″E
- Country: Russia
- Federal subject: Murmansk Oblast
- Administrative district: Kandalakshsky District
- Territorial okrugSelsoviet: Lesozavodsky Territorial Okrug
- Elevation: 0 m (0 ft)

Population (2010 Census)
  - Total: 391
  - Estimate (2021): 165 (−57.8%)

Municipal status
  - Municipal district: Kandalakshsky Municipal District
  - Urban settlement: Zelenoborsky Urban Settlement
- Time zone: UTC+3 (MSK)
- Postal code: 184001
- Dialing code: +7 81533
- OKTMO ID: 47608158121

Lesozavodsky (Russian: Лесозаво́дский) is a rural locality (an inhabited locality) in Kandalakshsky District of Murmansk Oblast, Russia, located beyond the Arctic Circle at a height of 1 meter (3 ft 3 in) above sea level. Population: 391 (2010 Census).
