= Ruchyi, Mezensky District, Arkhangelsk Oblast =

Ruchyi Ручьи
- Selo
- Location within Arkhangelsk Oblast Location within Russia
- Coordinates: 66°02′N 41°13′E
- Country: Russia
- Region: Arkhangelsk Oblast
- District: Mezensky District
- Time zone: UTC+3:00

Ruchyi (Russian: Ручьи) is a rural locality (a selo) and the administrative center of Ruchyevskoye Rural Settlement of Mezensky District, Arkhangelsk Oblast, Russia. The population was 219 as of 2010. There are 4 streets.

== Geography ==
Ruchyi is located 522 km west of Mezen (the district's administrative centre) by road.
