= Lesozavodskoy =

Lesozavodskoy Лесозаводской
- Settlement
- Location within Republic of Buryatia Location within Russia
- Coordinates: 51°34′N 108°47′E
- Country: Russia
- Region: Republic of Buryatia
- District: Zaigrayevsky District
- Time zone: UTC+8:00

Lesozavodskoy (Russian: Лесозаводской) is a rural locality (a settlement) in Zaigrayevsky District, Republic of Buryatia, Russia. The population was 781 as of 2010. There are 9 streets.

== Geography ==
Lesozavodskoy is located 55 km southeast of Zaigrayevo (the district's administrative centre) by road. Dede-Tala is the nearest rural locality.
