= Ruchyi, Pinezhsky District, Arkhangelsk Oblast =

Ruchyi Ручьи
- Settlement
- Location within Arkhangelsk Oblast Location within Russia
- Coordinates: 63°33′N 45°13′E
- Country: Russia
- Region: Arkhangelsk Oblast
- District: Pinezhsky District
- Time zone: UTC+3:00

Ruchyi (Russian: Ручьи) is a rural locality (a settlement) in Lavelskoye Rural Settlement of Pinezhsky District, Arkhangelsk Oblast, Russia. The population was 2 as of 2010.

== Geography ==
Ruchyi is located on the Sora River, 101 km southeast of Karpogory (the district's administrative centre) by road. Novolavela is the nearest rural locality.
