= Kandalaksha Nature Reserve =

Strict nature reserve in Murmansk Oblast, Russia

- Russian: Кандалакшский заповедник (Also: Kandalakshsky)
- IUCN category Ia (strict nature reserve)
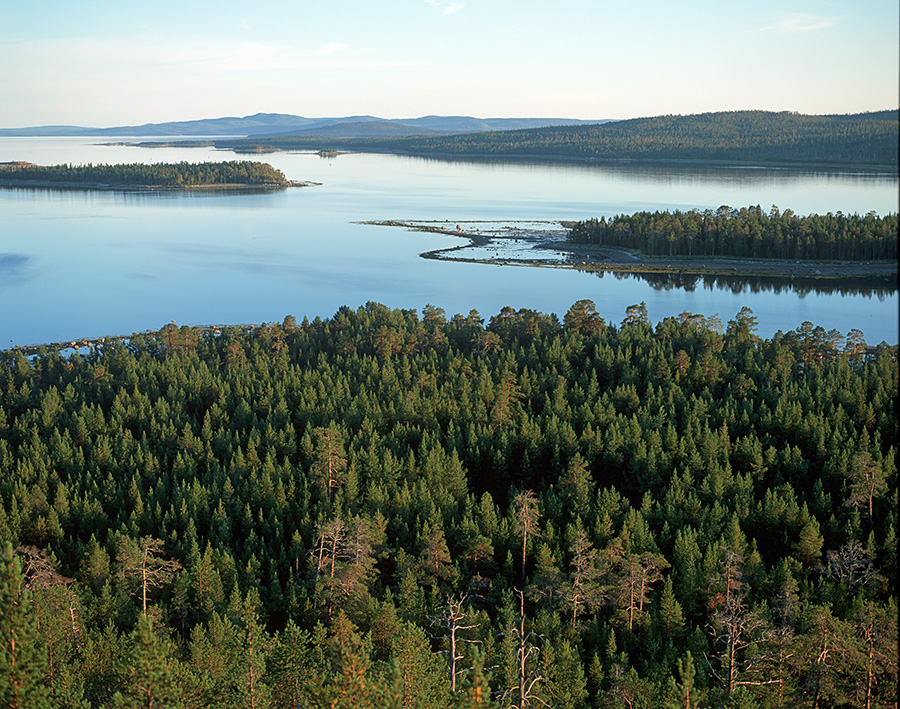
- Kandalaksha Zapovednik

- Location within Russia
- Location: Murmansk Oblast
- Nearest city: Kandalaksha
- Coordinates: 67°4′34″N 32°31′30″E
- Area: 70,530 hectares (174,283 acres; 272 sq mi)
- Established: 1932
- Governing body: Ministry of Natural Resources and Environment (Russia)
- Website: http://www.kandalaksha-reserve.ru/

Kandalaksha Nature Reserve (Russian: Кандалакшский заповедник) (also Kandalakshsky) is a Russian 'zapovednik' (strict ecological reserve) on the south shore of Kandalaksha Bay in the Murmansk and Karelia regions on the opening to the White Sea. The reserve also includes two small sectors on the northern coast of the Kola Peninsula on the Barents Sea; notably, the warm Atlantic current causes the northern sectors on the Barents Sea to be warmer than the more southerly White Sea sectors. Over 550 islands are covered in the boundaries of the reserve. It is one of the oldest nature reserves in Russia, created in 1932 to protect the marine habitats and waterfowl of the region, particularly the eider. The reserve is situated in the Kandalakshsky District, Kolsky District, and Lovozersky District of Murmansk Oblast. The nearest city, Kandalaksha, is at the northwest entrance to the Kandalaksha Gulf, about 5 km from the nearest point in the reserve. Since 1976, the reserve has been part of the Ramsar wetland site of international importance "Kandalaksha Bay". It covers an area of 70,530 ha (272.3 sq mi).

== Topography ==
The dominant topography is sea-island archipelago, with surrounding marine areas and adjacent coastal zones. The Kandalaksha Bay portion of the reserve covers a significant shore-side area, and numerous islands along the southern coast. Some of the islands are forested; others are skerries (small rounded rocks without vegetation). The terrain is coastal/island taiga in the southern sector. The Barents Sea sectors to the north are mostly coastal tundra. 74% of the reserve is marine, the remainder is terrestrial.

== Climate and ecoregion ==
Kandalaksha is located in the Scandinavian and Russian taiga ecoregion, which is situated in Northern Europe between tundra in the north and temperate mixed forests in the south. It is covers parts of Norway, Sweden, Finland and the northern part of European Russia, being the largest ecoregion in Europe. The ecoregion is characterized by coniferous forests dominated by Pinus sylvestris (in drier locations), often with an understory of Juniperus communis, Picea abies and Picea obovata and a significant admixture of Betula pubescens and Betula pendula. Larix sibirica is characteristic of the eastern part of the ecoregion.

The climate of Kandalaksha is humid continental climate, cool summer (Köppen climate classification (Dfc)). This climate is characterized by long cold winters, and short, cool summers. The region has milder weather than other areas north of the Arctic Circle, as the Murmansk region is warmed by the North Cape branch of the Gulf Stream.

== Flora and fauna ==
Kandalasky is known for its taiga and tundra floral communities. Over 700 species of vascular plants and 400 species of bryophytes (liverworts and leafy mosses) have been recorded. Biodiversity is higher at the Barents Sea site than the upper Kandalaksha, mostly due to long periods of ice cover and lower salinity at the southern location. But the biomass of algae and invertebrates is much higher. Typical trees are pine and spruce. Lichens (inter-dependent communities of algae and fungi) cover the coastal rocks and shores.

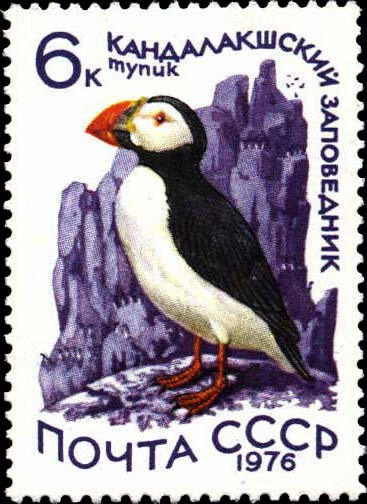
Stamp honoring Kandalaksha Reserve, USSR 1976

The Kandalaksha Reserve is the main breeding ground in Russia for the Atlantic and large crested cormorants, and for the Atlantic gray seal. Belugas are the most famous among cetaceans while other species such as harbour porpoises, whales (bowhead, humpback, rorquals, northern bottlenose, orcas) less frequently appear.

Also, almost all common eider in the Murmansk region breed in the reserve. The sea ducks prefer to nest on treeless islands. High numbers of fish - particularly cod, haddock, and lumpfish, are a draw for the waterfowl. Characteristic mammals of the reserve include moose, brown bear, fox, hare, squirrel, marten, and ermine. Common birds include black grouse, ptarmigan, kestrel, and large owls.

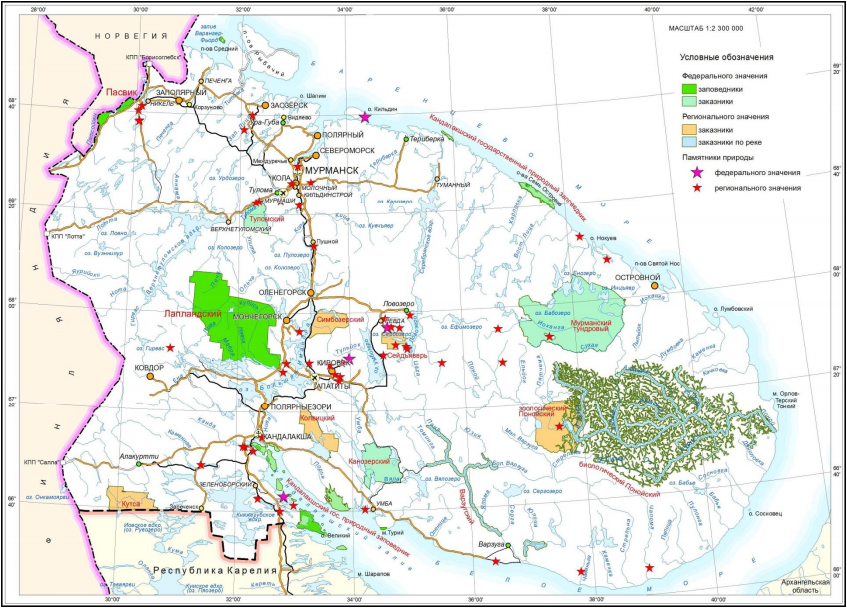
PA's of Murmansk (in green). Kandalaksha sectors are in the south along the bay, and on the north shore of the Barents Sea

== Ecoeducation and access ==
As a strict nature reserve, the Kandalaksha Reserve is mostly closed to the general public, although scientists and those with 'environmental education' purposes can make arrangements with park management for visits. There are a number of 'ecotourist' routes in the reserve, however, that are open to the public, primarily in May–October. Permits must be obtained in advance. The reserve has a number of "buffer zones" outside the official borders, where recreational fly fishing and primitive camping are permitted. The southern sectors on the bay are in Kandalakshsky District; the Barents Sea sectors are in Kolsky District and Lovozersky District of Murmansk Oblast. The main office is in the city of Kandalaksha.

== See also ==
- List of Russian Nature Reserves (class 1a 'zapovedniks')
- National parks of Russia
