= Fedoseyevka, Murmansk Oblast =

Fedoseyevka Федосеевка
- Selo
- Interactive map of Fedoseyevka
- Location of Fedoseyevka Fedoseyevka (Murmansk Oblast)
- Coordinates: 67°06′15″N 32°10′45″E
- Country: Russia
- Federal subject: Murmansk Oblast
- Administrative district: Kandalakshsky District
- Territorial OkrugSelsoviet: Belomorsky Territorial Okrug

Population (2010 Census)
  - Total: 3
  - Estimate (2021): 0 (−100%)

Municipal status
  - Municipal district: Kandalakshsky Municipal District
  - Urban settlement: Kandalaksha Urban Settlement
- Time zone: UTC+3 (MSK)
- Postal code: 184020
- OKTMO ID: 47608101116

Fedoseyevka (Russian: Федосе́евка) is a rural locality (a selo) in Kandalakshsky District of Murmansk Oblast, Russia, located beyond the Arctic Circle at a height of 1 meter (3 ft 3 in) above sea level. Population: 3 (2010 Census).
