= Ruchyi, Murmansk Oblast =

Ruchyi Ручьи
- Station
- Interactive map of Ruchyi
- Location of Ruchyi Ruchyi (Murmansk Oblast)
- Coordinates: 67°4′19″N 32°11′30″E
- Country: Russia
- Federal subject: Murmansk Oblast
- Administrative district: Kandalakshsky District

Population (2010 Census)
  - Total: 1
  - Estimate (2021): 0 (−100%)
- Time zone: UTC+3 (MSK)
- Postal code: 184040
- Dialing code: +7 81533
- OKTMO ID: 47608101141

Ruchyi (Russian: Ручьи́) is the rural locality (a Station) in Kandalakshskiy District of Murmansk Oblast, Russia. The village is located beyond the Arctic Circle, on the Kola Peninsula. Located at a height of 80 m above sea level.
