= Ruchyi, Vologda Oblast =

Ruchyi Ручьи
- Village
- Location within Vologda Oblast Location within Russia
- Coordinates: 58°47′N 37°13′E
- Country: Russia
- Region: Vologda Oblast
- District: Cherepovetsky District
- Time zone: UTC+3:00

Ruchyi (Russian: Ручьи) is a rural locality (a village) in Nikolo-Ramenskoye Rural Settlement, Cherepovetsky District, Vologda Oblast, Russia. The population was 7 as of 2002. There are 2 streets.

== Geography ==
Ruchyi is located 91 km (57 mi) southwest of Cherepovets (the district's administrative centre) by road. Kharlamovskaya is the nearest rural locality.
