= Zelenoborsky =

Zelenoborsky Зеленоборский
- Urban-type settlement
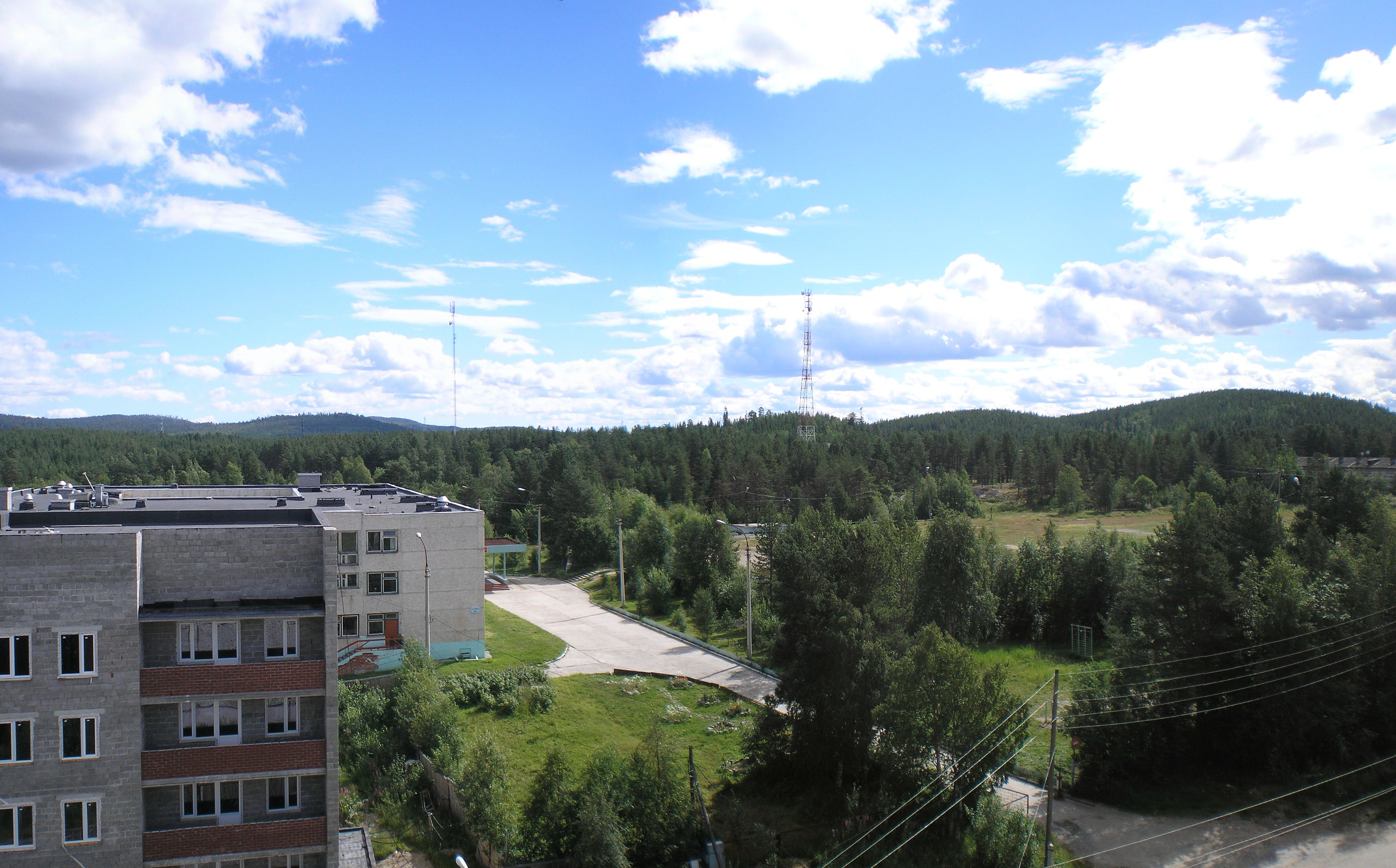
- View of Zelenoborsky

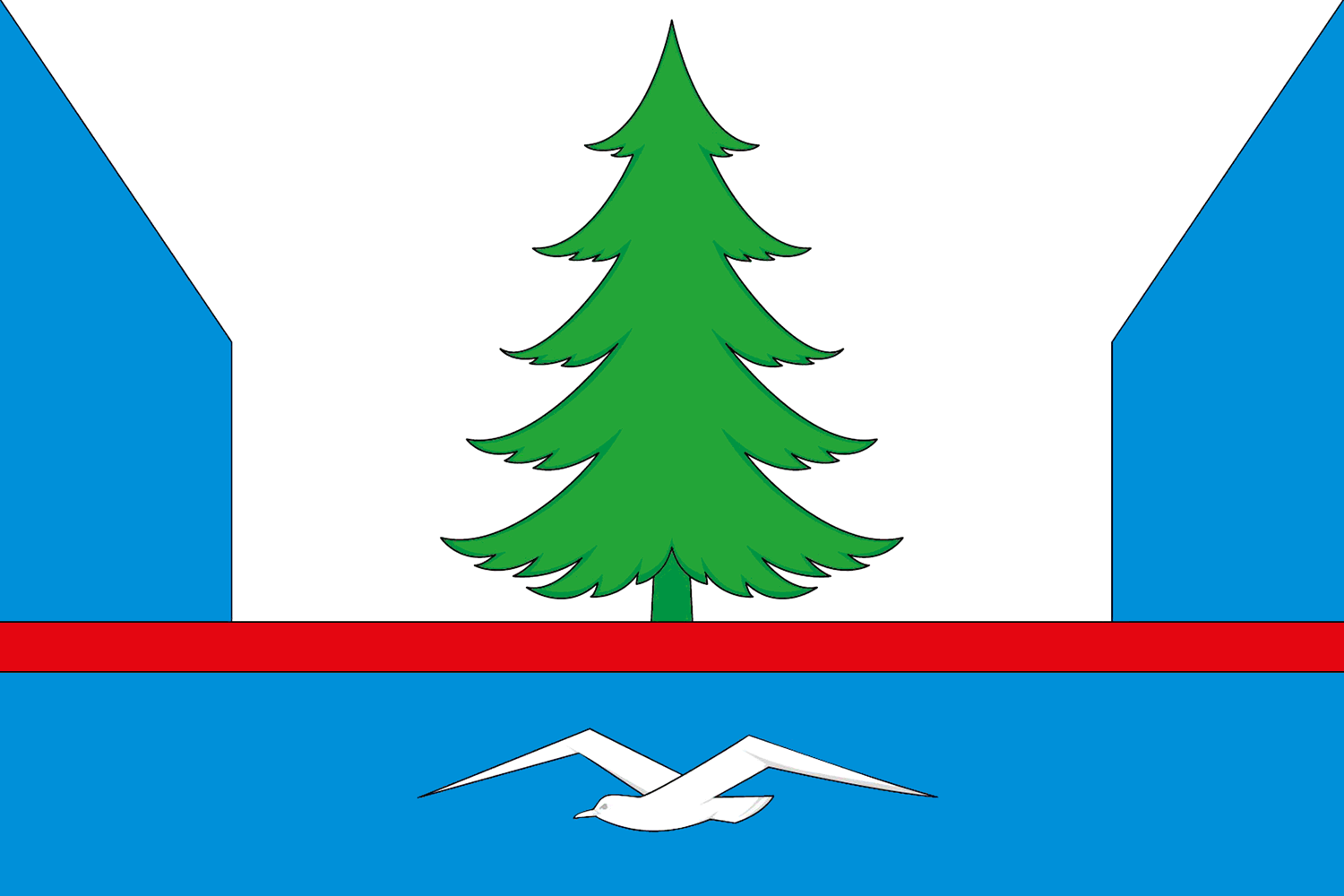
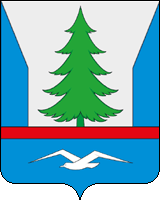
- Flag Coat of arms
- Interactive map of Zelenoborsky
- Location of Zelenoborsky Zelenoborsky (Murmansk Oblast)
- Coordinates: 66°50′42″N 32°21′43″E
- Country: Russia
- Federal subject: Murmansk Oblast
- Administrative district: Kandalakshsky District
- Founded: 1951
- Elevation: 73 m (240 ft)

Population (2010 Census)
  - Total: 6,560
  - Estimate (2025): 3,429 (−47.7%)

Municipal status
  - Municipal district: Kandalakshsky Municipal District
  - Urban settlement: Zelenoborsky Urban Settlement
- Time zone: UTC+3 (MSK)
- Postal code: 184020
- Dialing code: +7 81533
- OKTMO ID: 47608158051

Zelenoborsky (Russian: Зеленобо́рский) is an urban locality (an urban-type settlement) in Kandalakshsky District of Murmansk Oblast, Russia, located directly west of the Kola Peninsula on the lower Kovda River, 235 kilometers (146 mi) south of Murmansk. Population: 6,560 (2010 census); 7,640 (2002 census); 9,643 (1989 Soviet census).

It was founded as a work settlement around 1951.

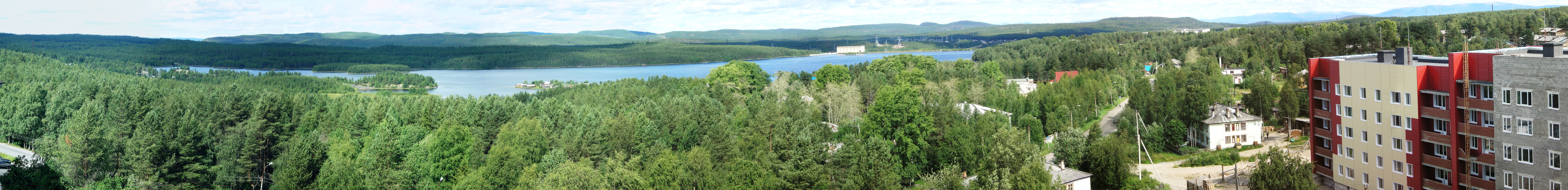
Panorama of Zelenoborsky
