= Kovda, Lesozavodsky Territorial Okrug, Kandalakshsky District, Murmansk Oblast =

Kovda Ковда
- Selo
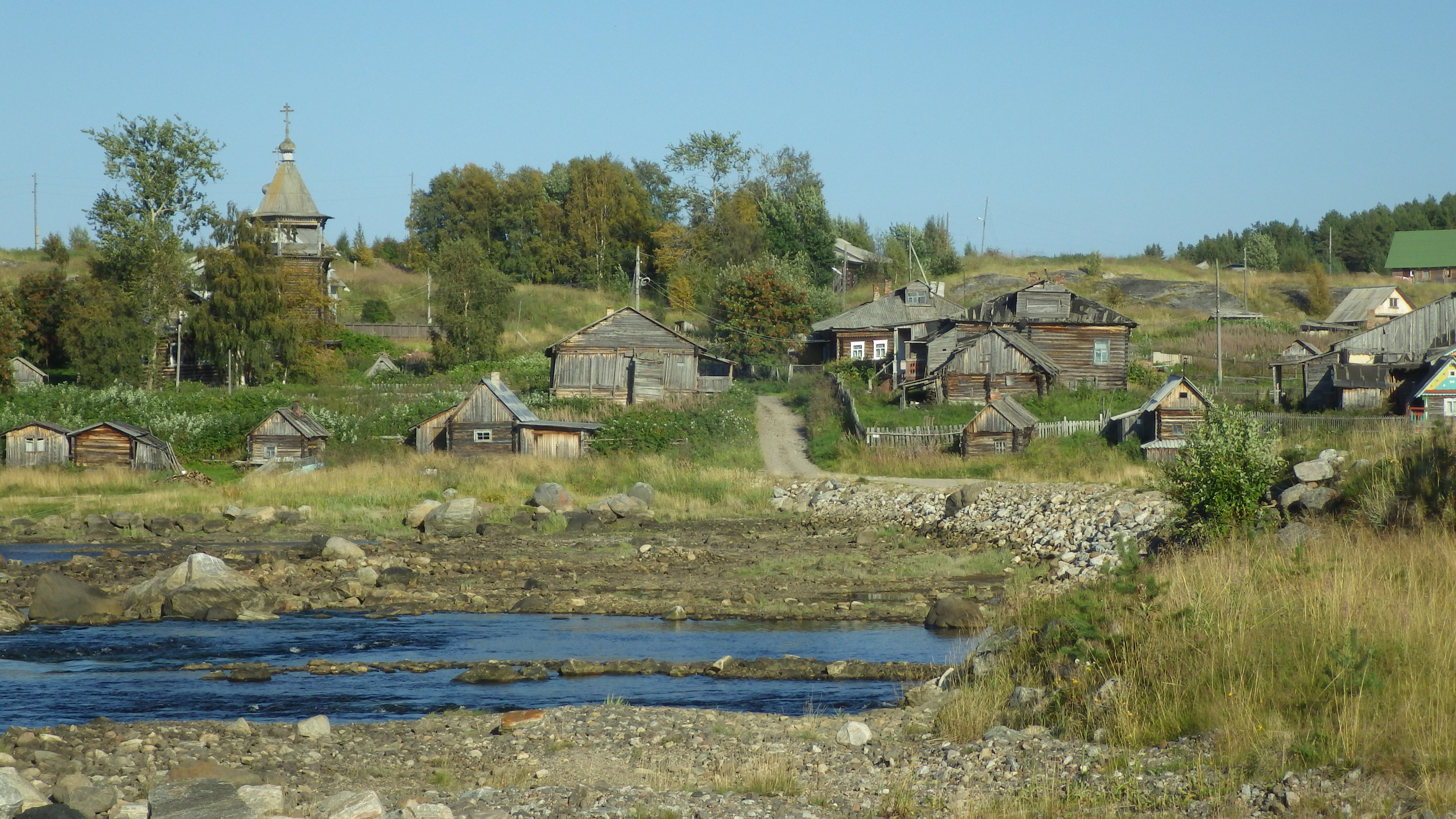
- Interactive map of Kovda
- Location of Kovda Kovda (Murmansk Oblast)
- Coordinates: 66°41′31″N 32°52′15″E
- Country: Russia
- Federal subject: Murmansk Oblast
- Administrative district: Kandalakshsky District
- Territorial okrugSelsoviet: Lesozavodsky Territorial Okrug

Population (2010 Census)
  - Total: 20
  - Estimate (2021): 22 (+10%)

Municipal status
  - Municipal district: Kandalakshsky Municipal District
  - Urban settlement: Zelenoborsky Urban Settlement
- Time zone: UTC+3 (MSK)
- Postal code: 184040
- Dialing code: +7 81533
- OKTMO ID: 47608158111

Kovda (Russian: Ко́вда) is a rural locality (a selo) in Kandalakshsky District of Murmansk Oblast, Russia, located beyond the Arctic Circle at a height of 18 meters (59 ft) above sea level. Population: 20 (2010 Census).
