= Kandalaksha =

Town in Murmansk Oblast, Russia

Kandalaksha Кандалакша Kantalahti, Kannanlahti, Kandalakši, Kannanlakši, Kandalahti, Käddluhtt
- Town
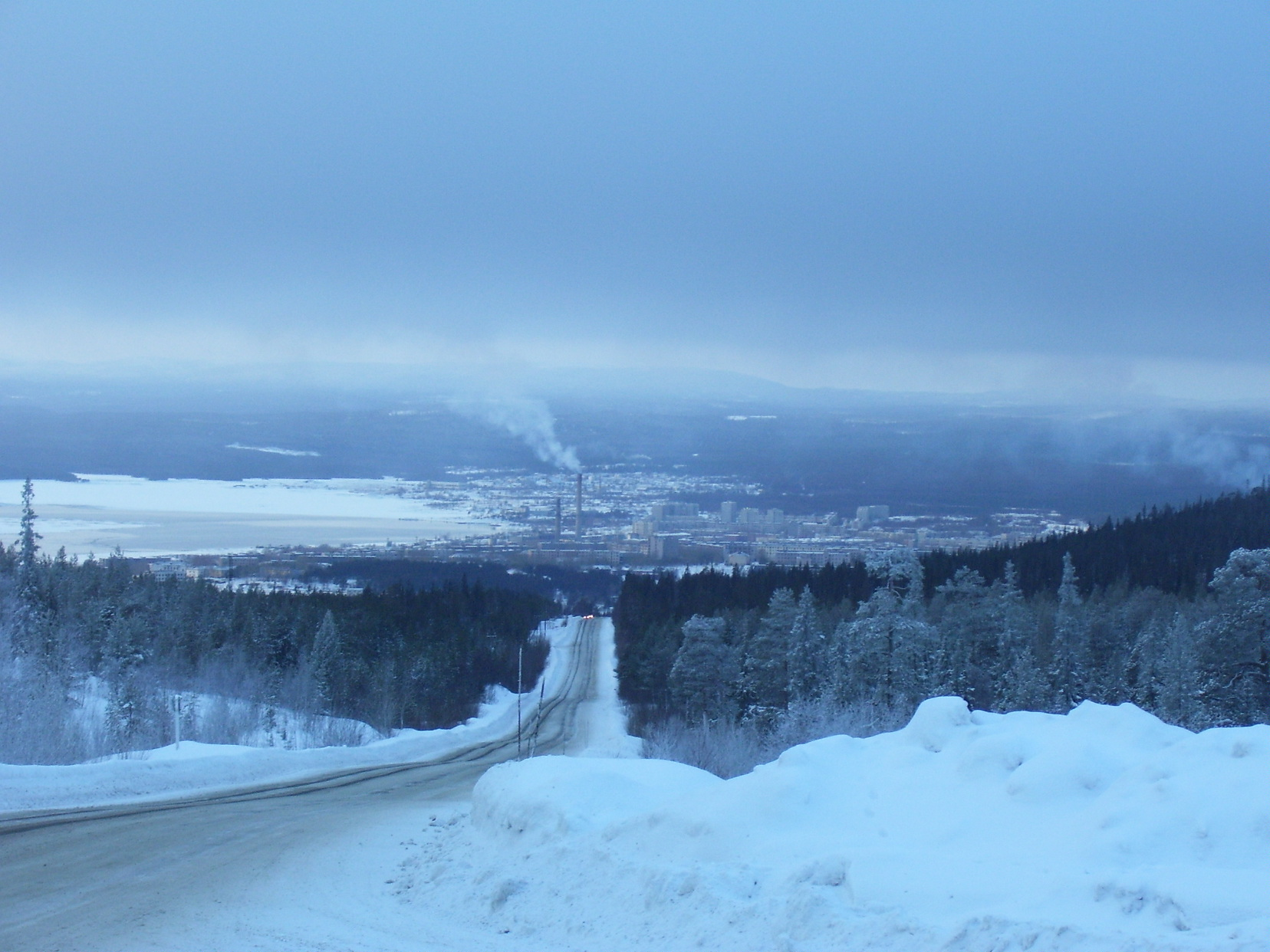
- A view of Kandalaksha

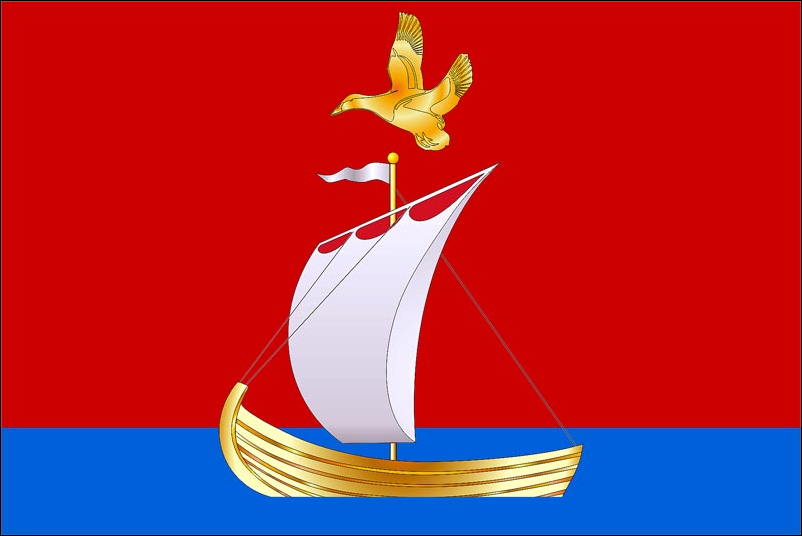
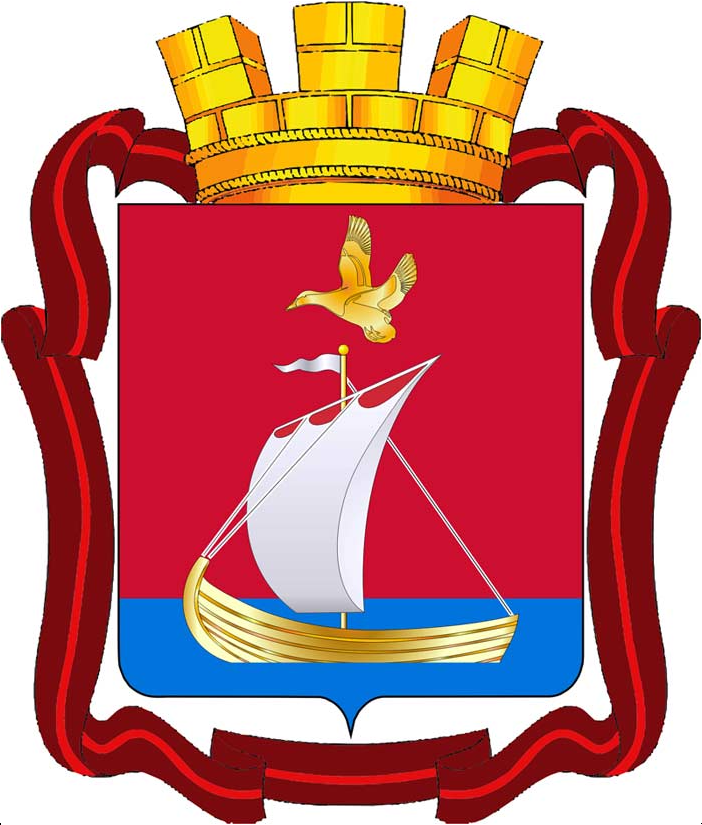
- Flag Coat of arms
- Interactive map of Kandalaksha
- Location of Kandalaksha Kandalaksha (Murmansk Oblast)
- Coordinates: 67°09′25″N 32°24′42″E
- Country: Russia
- Federal subject: Murmansk Oblast
- Administrative district: Kandalakshsky District
- First mentioned: 1517
- Town status since: April 20, 1938
- Elevation: 20 m (66 ft)

Population (2010 Census)
  - Total: 35,654
  - Estimate (2023): 28,438 (−20.2%)

Municipal status
  - Municipal district: Kandalakshsky Municipal District
  - Urban settlement: Kandalaksha Urban Settlement
- Time zone: UTC+3 (MSK)
- Postal code: 184041
- Dialing code: +7 81533
- OKTMO ID: 47608101001

Kandalaksha (Note: Russian: Кандала́кша, Karelian: Kandalakši / Kannanlakši / Kandalahti, Finnish: Kantalahti / Kannanlahti; Skolt Sami: Käddluhtt.) is a town in Kandalakshsky District of Murmansk Oblast, Russia, located at the head of Kandalaksha Gulf on the White Sea, north of the Arctic Circle. Population: 29,138 (2021 census); 35,654 (2010 census); 40,564 (2002 census); 54,080 (1989 Soviet census).

== Etymology ==
According to the most common version, the name of the town comes from its location on the shore of Kandalaksha Bay, where kanda is the name of the river that traverses the town and laksha means 'bay' (Karelian: lakši, lit. 'bay'). According to other sources, the name of the bay may come from the Sámi names Kantlukht (kannҍt, 'hill' or 'dry place among a swamp', лӯххт, 'bay') or Kandaslukht (ка̄нҍтэсь, 'pack saddle', лӯххт, 'bay'), meaning 'the bay where horse packs were reloaded'.

Historical population
Year	Pop.	±%
1926	4,195	—
1939	22,172	+428.5%
1959	38,222	+72.4%
1970	42,656	+11.6%
1979	45,430	+6.5%
1989	54,080	+19.0%
2002	40,564	−25.0%
2010	35,654	−12.1%
2021	29,138	−18.3%
Population size may be affected by changes in administrative divisions. Source: Censuses

== History ==
The settlement was possibly founded in the 11th century and it became part of the Novgorod Republic, which was later annexed in 1478 by the Grand Principality of Moscow, the new leading Russian state. Kandalaksha is first mentioned in documents in 1517. In a decree by Vasili III of Russia to local tax collectors, Kandalaksha is mentioned as the center of a volost. Russian chronicles mention that the Sámi were baptized there in 1526. The same year, Kandalaksha (Kokuyev) male monastery was founded near the Church of St. John the Baptist.

In 1854, during the Crimean War, the town was plundered by the British.

In 1915, the construction of a seaport started, and in 1918 a railroad connecting Moscow to Murmansk running through Kandalaksha was opened. On August 29, 1927, Kandalaksha was made the administrative center of the newly established Kandalakshsky District, and on June 1, 1932, it was granted work settlement status. Status of a town of district significance was granted to it on April 20, 1938. On February 9, 1940, Kandalaksha was administratively separated from the district and granted the status of a town of oblast significance.

In July 1941, during World War II, the town was the primary target of an unsuccessful German-Finnish offensive which attempted to cut the strategic Kirov Railway.

By the Decree of the Presidium of the Supreme Soviet of the RSFSR of March 19, 1959, the Councils of Deputies of Kandalaksha and of Kandalakshsky District were merged into one Kandalaksha Town Council of Deputies. While the district was nominally retained as a separate administrative division, all its subdivisions were administratively subordinated to the town's Council of Deputies.

Since 1995, Vitino oil port operates near Beloye More a few kilometers south of Kandalaksha.

Kandalaksha mayor Nina Varlamova was murdered in an attack in December 2008.

In 2025, Yleisradio Oy reported that a military garrison was being built in the town.

== International relations ==
=== Twin towns and sister cities ===
Kandalaksha is twinned with:

- Kemijärvi, Finland
- Piteå, Sweden

== Geography ==
The town is located at the head of Kandalaksha Gulf on the White Sea, north of the Arctic Circle. Kandalaksha Nature Reserve is one of World's oldest biosphere parks. It borders the town on the south side and includes numerous islands in Kandalaksha Bay.

=== Climate ===
Kandalaksha has a subarctic climate (Dfc) with mild, rainy summers, and cold, snowy winters.

Climate data for Kandalaksha (Climate ID:22217) 1991-2020
Month	Jan	Feb	Mar	Apr	May	Jun	Jul	Aug	Sep	Oct	Nov	Dec	Year
Record high °C (°F)	7.5 (45.5)	8.0 (46.4)	12.2 (54.0)	18.9 (66.0)	27.2 (81.0)	31.4 (88.5)	31.6 (88.9)	32.0 (89.6)	24.7 (76.5)	14.7 (58.5)	11.4 (52.5)	8.0 (46.4)	32.0 (89.6)
Mean daily maximum °C (°F)	−7.7 (18.1)	−6.9 (19.6)	−1.6 (29.1)	3.8 (38.8)	9.8 (49.6)	16.2 (61.2)	19.5 (67.1)	16.9 (62.4)	11.4 (52.5)	4.0 (39.2)	−1.9 (28.6)	−5 (23)	4.9 (40.8)
Daily mean °C (°F)	−11.4 (11.5)	−10.9 (12.4)	−6.2 (20.8)	−0.5 (31.1)	5.3 (41.5)	11.5 (52.7)	14.9 (58.8)	12.6 (54.7)	7.6 (45.7)	1.4 (34.5)	−4.4 (24.1)	−8.2 (17.2)	1.0 (33.8)
Mean daily minimum °C (°F)	−15.8 (3.6)	−15.4 (4.3)	−11.1 (12.0)	−5.1 (22.8)	1.1 (34.0)	7.0 (44.6)	10.5 (50.9)	8.4 (47.1)	3.8 (38.8)	−1.4 (29.5)	−7.5 (18.5)	−12 (10)	−3.1 (26.3)
Record low °C (°F)	−43.5 (−46.3)	−41.6 (−42.9)	−34.6 (−30.3)	−27.9 (−18.2)	−15 (5)	−4.5 (23.9)	1.8 (35.2)	−3.6 (25.5)	−9.7 (14.5)	−21.8 (−7.2)	−30.4 (−22.7)	−39.5 (−39.1)	−43.5 (−46.3)
Average precipitation mm (inches)	41 (1.6)	34 (1.3)	30 (1.2)	28 (1.1)	45 (1.8)	56 (2.2)	75 (3.0)	63 (2.5)	56 (2.2)	53 (2.1)	46 (1.8)	44 (1.7)	571 (22.5)
Average rainy days	1	2	3	9	18	18	18	18	19	15	6	3	130
Average snowy days	24	23	22	15	9	1	0	0	1	11	21	24	151
Average relative humidity (%)	86	84	81	75	72	69	74	79	84	86	89	87	81
Mean monthly sunshine hours	3.2	45.0	129.2	184.6	231.1	271.5	267.6	186.6	110.6	55.8	9.6	0.0	1,494.8
Source 1: Roshydromet
Source 2: NOAA (sun)

== Gallery ==
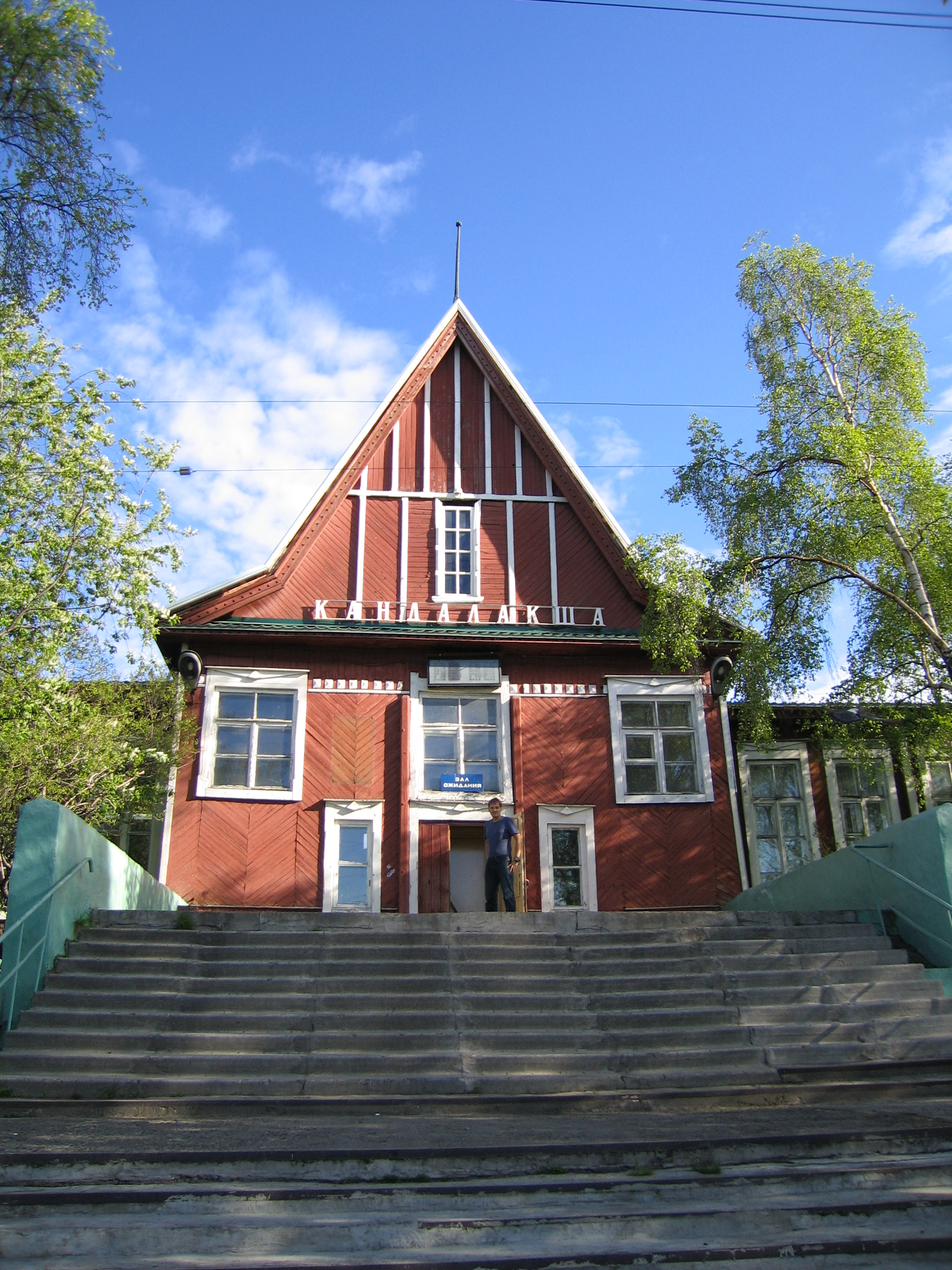
Kandalaksha railway station

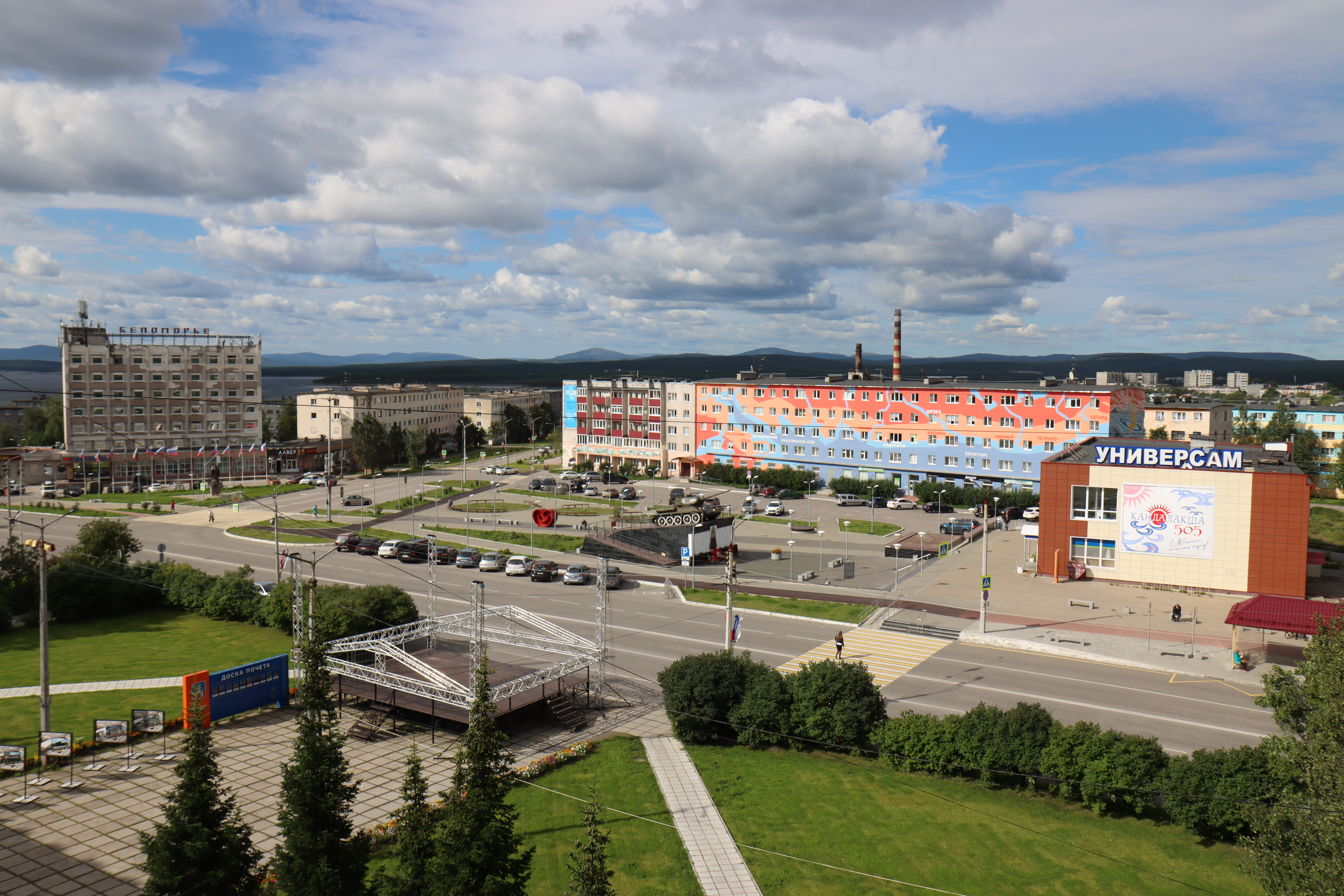
Kandalaksha city center

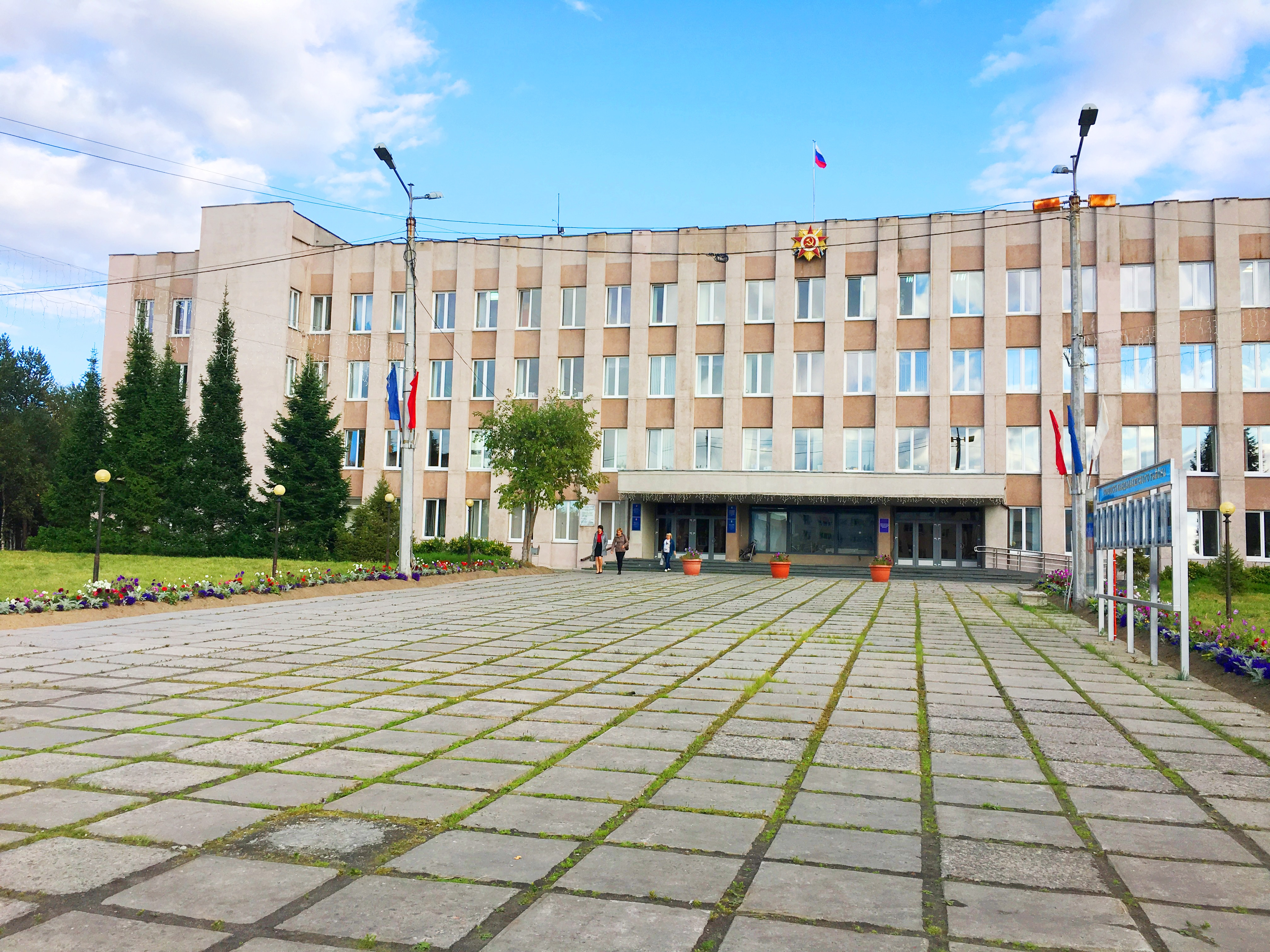
Kandalaskha city administration

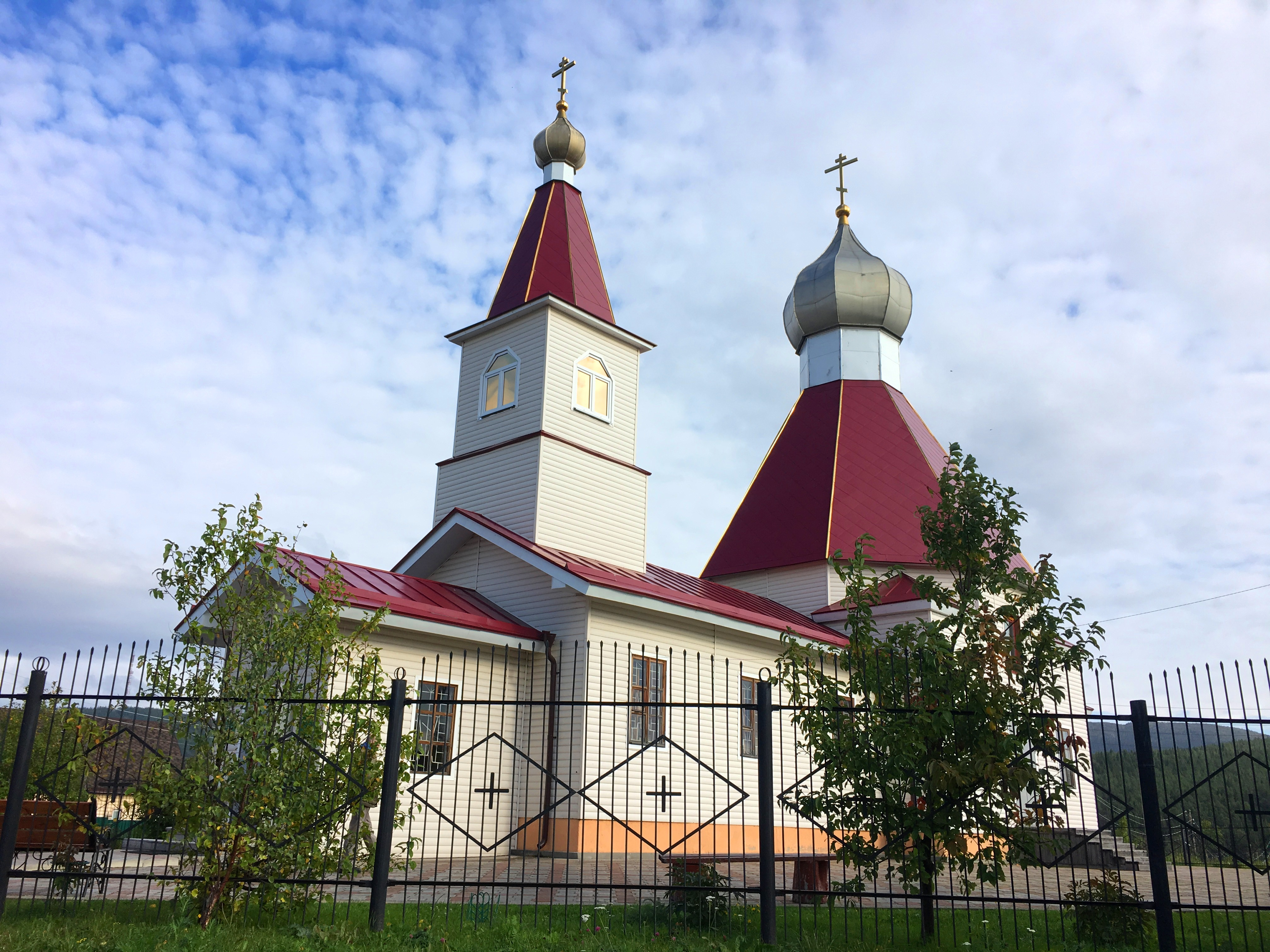
Church of St. John the Baptist

== See also ==
- Lake Lupche

== Sources ==
- Архивный отдел Администрации Мурманской области. Государственный Архив Мурманской области. (1995). Административно-территориальное деление Мурманской области (1920-1993 гг.). Справочник. Мурманск: Мурманское издательско-полиграфическое предприятие "Север".
