= Kandalaksha Gulf =

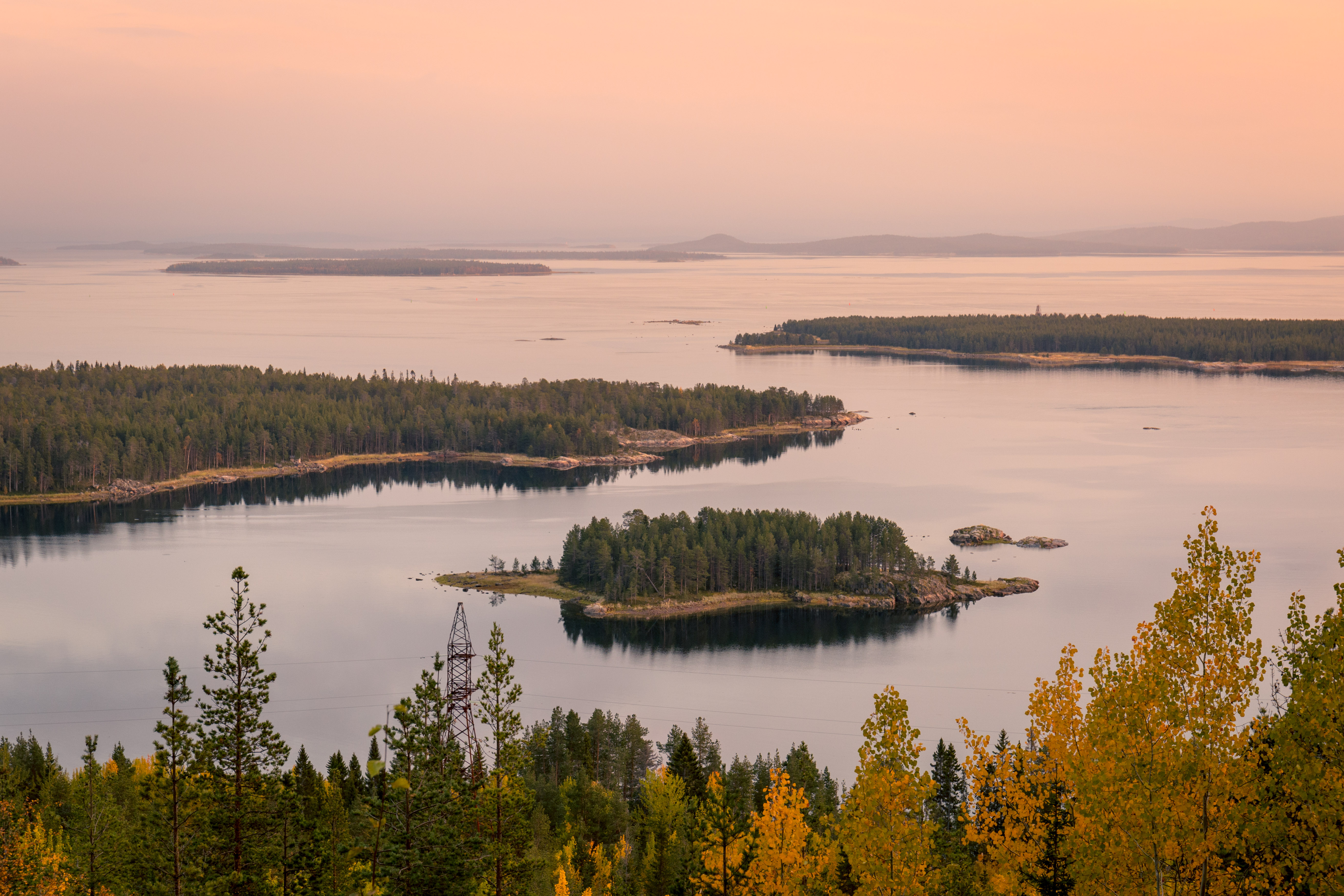
- Kandalaksha Gulf

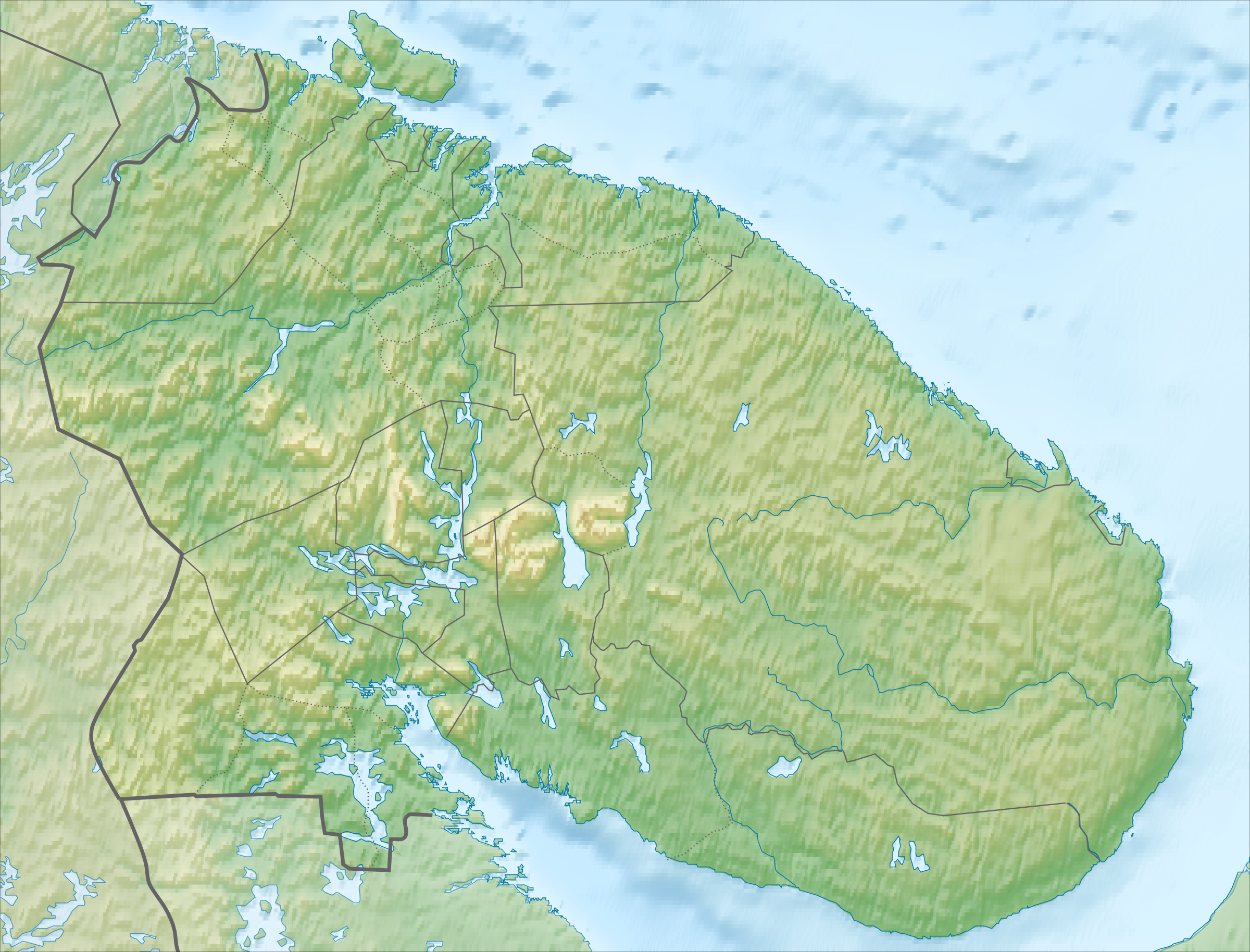
- Location within Murmansk Oblast

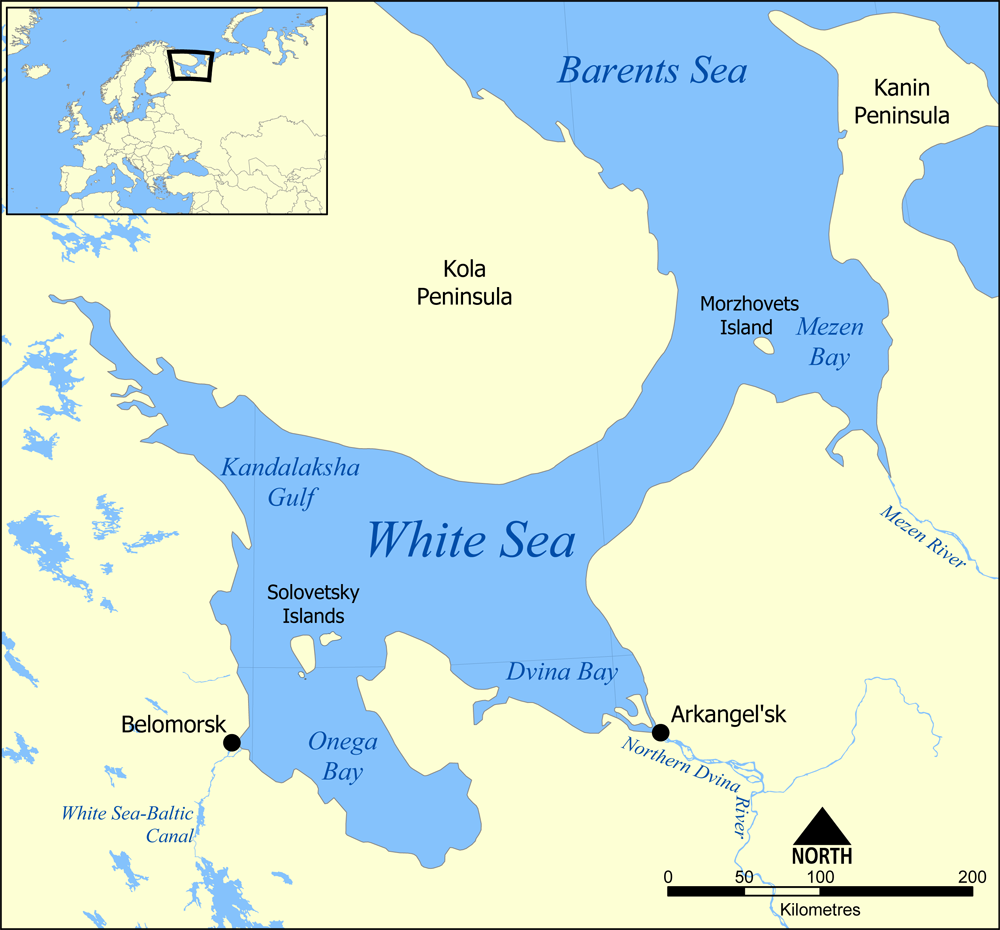
- Kandalaksha Gulf: Northwest gulf of the White Sea
- Coordinates: 66°55′N 32°45′E
- Type: Gulf
- Basin countries: Russia
- Max. depth: 300 m (980 ft)

Ramsar Wetland
- Official name: Kandalaksha Bay
- Designated: 11 October 1976
- Reference no.: 110

The Kandalaksha Gulf (Russian: Кандалакшский залив, Skolt Sami: Käddluhtt, Finnish: Kantalahti) is located in the Republic of Karelia, and Murmansk Oblast in northwestern Russia. Forming the north-western corner of the White Sea, it is one of four large bays and gulfs of this sea, the others being the Onega Bay (south-west), the Dvina Bay (south), and the Mezen Bay (south east).

The Kola Peninsula lies north of the Kandalaksha Gulf. The city of Kandalaksha is located at the northern tip of the gulf; the new oil port Vitino, some 10 km to the south. There are hundreds of skerries in the gulf. The gulf is shallow, reaching 300 meters on its western side. In 1976, the upper reaches of the gulf were designated a Ramsar wetland of international importance, notably as a breeding ground for migratory waterfowl such as the sea duck.

Kandalaksha Nature Reserve (Кандалакшский заповедник) includes parts of the coastline and many of the islands in the gulf. It is one of Russia's oldest nature reserves, established in 1932.

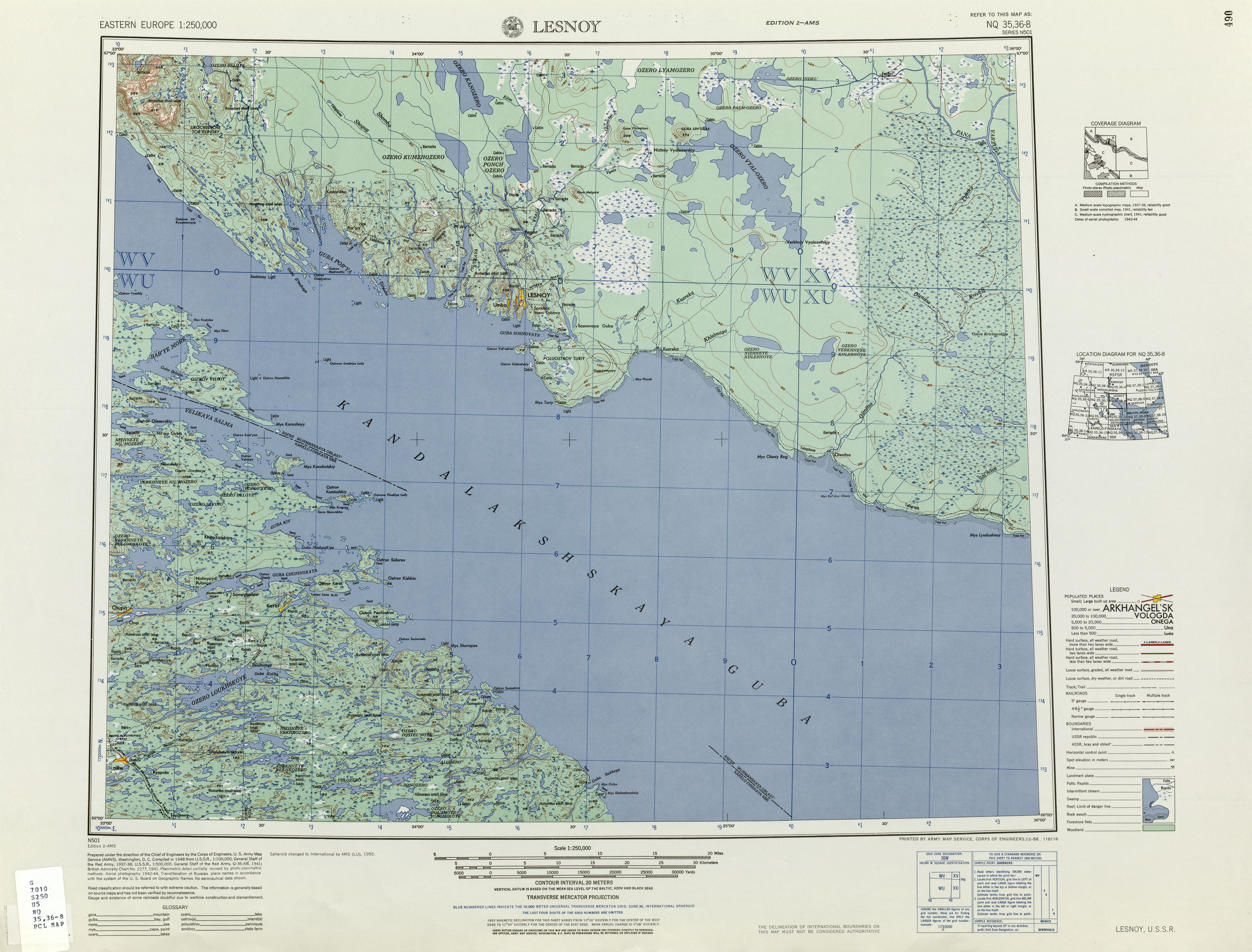
Cartographic Map of gulf (USSR 1954)

Since deglaciation the rate of post-glacial rebound in the Kandalaksha Gulf has varied. Since the White Sea connected to the World's oceans uplift along southern coast of the gulf has totaled 90 m. In the interval 9,500–5,000 years ago uplift rate was of 9–13 mm/yr. Prior to the Atlantic period uplift rate had decreased to 5–5.5 mm/yr, to then rise briefly before arriving at the present uplift rate is of 4 mm/yr.

== See also ==
- Gandvik
- White Sea Rift System
