= Kandalakshsky District =

Kandalakshsky District Кандалакшский район (Russian)
- District
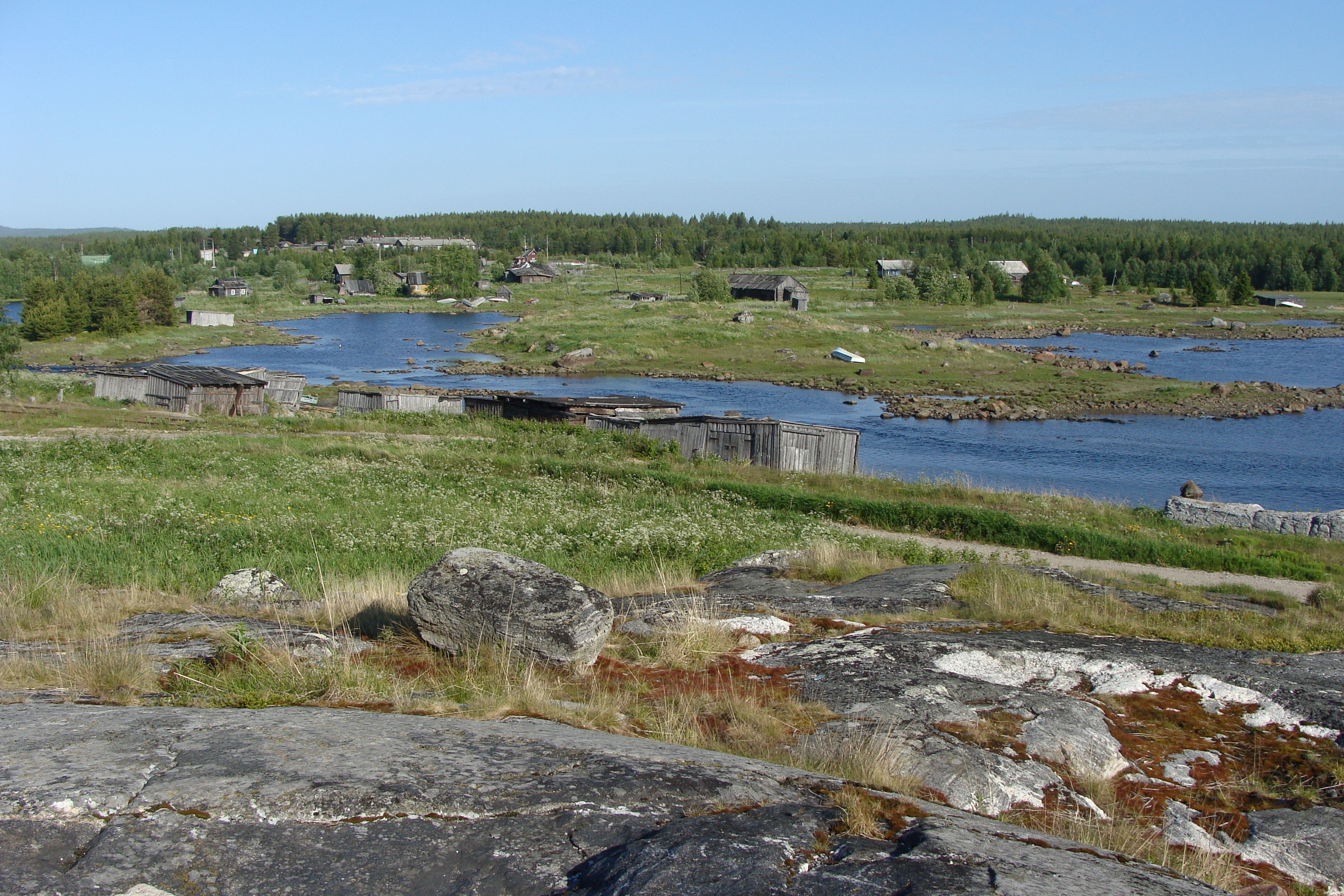
- Poyakonda, landscape in Kandalakshy District

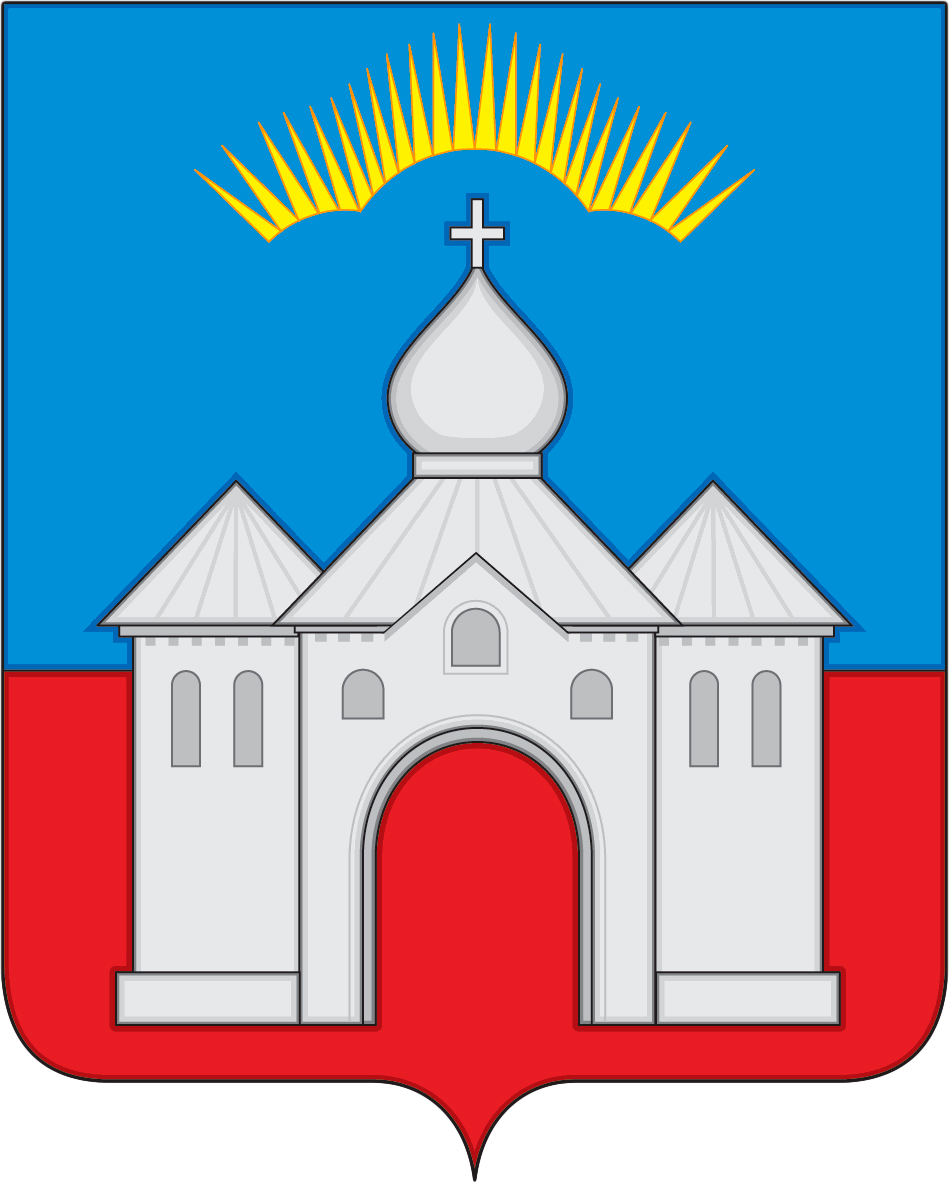
- Flag Coat of arms
- Location of Kandalakshsky District in Murmansk Oblast
- Coordinates: 67°13′N 32°20′E
- Country: Russia
- Federal subject: Murmansk Oblast
- Established: April 11, 2011
- Administrative center: Kandalaksha

Government
  - Type: Local government
  - Body: Council of Deputies
  - Head: Olga Mikheyeva

Area
  - Total: 14,400 km^{2} (5,600 sq mi)

Population (2010 Census)
  - Total: 49,544
  - Density: 3.44/km^{2} (8.91/sq mi)

Administrative structure
  - Administrative divisions: 1 Towns, 1 Urban-type settlements, 6 Territorial okrugs
  - Inhabited localities: 1 cities/towns, 1 urban-type settlements, 21 rural localities

Municipal structure
  - Municipally incorporated as: Kandalakshsky Municipal District
  - Municipal divisions: 2 urban settlements, 2 rural settlements
- Time zone: UTC+3 (MSK)
- OKTMO ID: 47608000
- Website: http://www.kandalaksha-admin.ru/

Kandalakshsky District (Russian: Кандала́кшский райо́н) is an administrative district (a raion), one of the six in Murmansk Oblast, Russia. As a municipal division, it is incorporated as Kandalakshsky Municipal District. It is located in the southwest of the oblast, and borders with Kovdorsky District to the north, Loukhsky District of the Republic of Karelia, and with Finland to the west. The area of the district is 14,400 square kilometers (5,600 sq mi). Its administrative center is the town of Kandalaksha. Population: 49,544 (2010 census); 60,140 (2002 census); 78,239 (1989 Soviet census). The population of Kandalaksha accounts for 72.0% of the district's total population.

== History ==
The district was first established by the All-Russian Central Executive Committee (VTsIK) Resolution of August 29, 1927 along with other new districts into which the Karelian ASSR was divided. The district included the territories of Kandalakshskaya and Kovdskaya Volosts and the village of Kyurela of Kestengskaya Volost. The administrative center of the district was in the selo of Kandalaksha.

On June 1, 1932, Kandalaksha was granted work settlement status. On April 1, 1937, the VTsIK adopted a Resolution on the administrative-territorial structure of the district, according to which the district included two work settlements (Kandalaksha and Nivsky) and five selsoviets (Kandalakshsky, Knyazhegubsky, Kolvitsky, Konets-Kovdozersky, and Kovdsky). On April 20, 1938, Kandalaksha was granted a status of town of district significance.

On May 28, 1938, the district became a part of the newly formed Murmansk Oblast, and on February 9, 1940, Kandalaksha was administratively separated from the district and granted a status of town of oblast significance.

Kandalakshsky District was abolished by the Decree of the Presidium of the Supreme Soviet of the Soviet Union on August 18, 1948 with its territory being administratively subordinated to the town of Kandalaksha. However, the district was reinstated in old borders by another decree on March 13, 1951. Kandalaksha again became the administrative center of the district.

By the Decree of the Presidium of the Supreme Soviet of the Soviet Union, on February 24, 1955 Alakurttinsky Selsoviet was transferred to Kandalakshsky District from Kestengsky District of the Karelo-Finnish SSR.

By the Decree of the Presidium of the Supreme Soviet of the RSFSR of March 19, 1959, the Councils of Deputies of Kandalaksha and of Kandalakshsky District were merged into one Kandalaksha Town Council of Deputies. The district was nominally retained as a separate administrative division, but all its subdivisions were administratively subordinated to the town's Council of Deputies. On February 1, 1963, the Decree by the Presidium of the Supreme Soviet of the RSFSR established the new structure of the districts of Murmansk Oblast, which no longer included Kandalakshsky District.

On December 2, 2004, Kandalakshsky Municipal District was established by Murmansk Oblast Duma on the territory of Kandalaksha Town With Jurisdictional Territory. The administrative district, however, was not restored until the law of April 11, 2011 amended the law on the administrative-territorial divisions of Murmansk Oblast to include it.

== Geography ==
Kandalaksha District sits in the southwest corner of Murmansk Olblast, covering 9.9% of the Murmansk region. A small part of the district is on the Kola Peninsula and the remainder on the mainland. It borders Finland to the west and the Republic of Karelia to the south. Kandalaksha Gulf is on the eastern border of the district. Most of the district is forested (60%) with pine and northern-taiga spruce-pine trees. Much of the remainder is lakes and rivers. The southern islands and territories of the Kandalaksha Nature Reserve are in the district.

== Notable residents ==
- Galina Shirshina (born 1979 in Alakurtti village), mayor of Petrozavodsk
- Venedikt Yerofeyev (born 1938 in Niva-3 settlement, suburb of Kandalaksha), writer and Soviet dissident
